= List of bridges in Maribor =

A list of bridges in Maribor, Slovenia:

== D ==
- Double-Storey Bridge (Slovene: Dvoetažni most)

== K ==
- Carinthian Bridge (Koroški most)

== M ==
- Malečnik Bridge (Malečniški most)

== S ==
- Slomšek Bridge (Slomškov most)
- Studenci Footbridge (Studenška brv)
- Old Bridge (Stari most)

== T ==
- Tito Bridge (Maribor) (Titov most)

== Ž ==
- Railway Bridge (Železniški most)
