= St. Lazar's Church (Maribor) =

St. Lazar's Church (Slovene: Spominska cerkev Lazarica or Cerkev sv. Lazarja) in Maribor, a town in northeastern Slovenia, was built during the time of the Kingdom of Yugoslavia on the former Yugoslavia Square (Jugoslovanski trg), today General Maister Square (Trg generala Maistra). It was dedicated to Saint Lazar, the Prince of Serbia (1371–1389), who was declared a saint after his death.

== History ==
=== Construction ===
In 1930, the city municipality of Maribor allowed the construction of a Serbian Orthodox cathedral in the park of the former Yugoslavia Square. The plans for the church were drawn by the Serbian architect Momir Korunović. In 1934 a founding stone was consecrated, and the church was built by the company "Inž. arh. Jelenc & inž. Šlajmer". Construction took place from 1935 to 1939, but it was never completed and the interior remained unfurnished.

=== Demolition ===
The church was demolished in 1941 as a part of Hitler's plan of to turn Maribor "German again" as he declared in his speech in the annexed city. Apart from ethnic discrimination toward the Slovene and Serbian communities in Maribor, the Nazis were also known for their hostile attitude against the Eastern Orthodox Church.

== Architecture ==
The first plan for the church was a slightly longitudinal ground plan with an octagonal sanctuary included in the center of the church. The octagon is an ancient architectural form common in Orthodox churches dating from the time of Eastern Roman Empire and Neo-Byzantine architecture.

According to the first plans for the church, the four domes were to be placed diagonally from the main dome; however, this was changed because they were placed frontally, forming a square around the main dome. The octagon which was originally broad, was made thinner, higher, and placed on a square form. Thus a thinner form of the main dome was achieved.
