= Maribor =

City in Styria, Slovenia

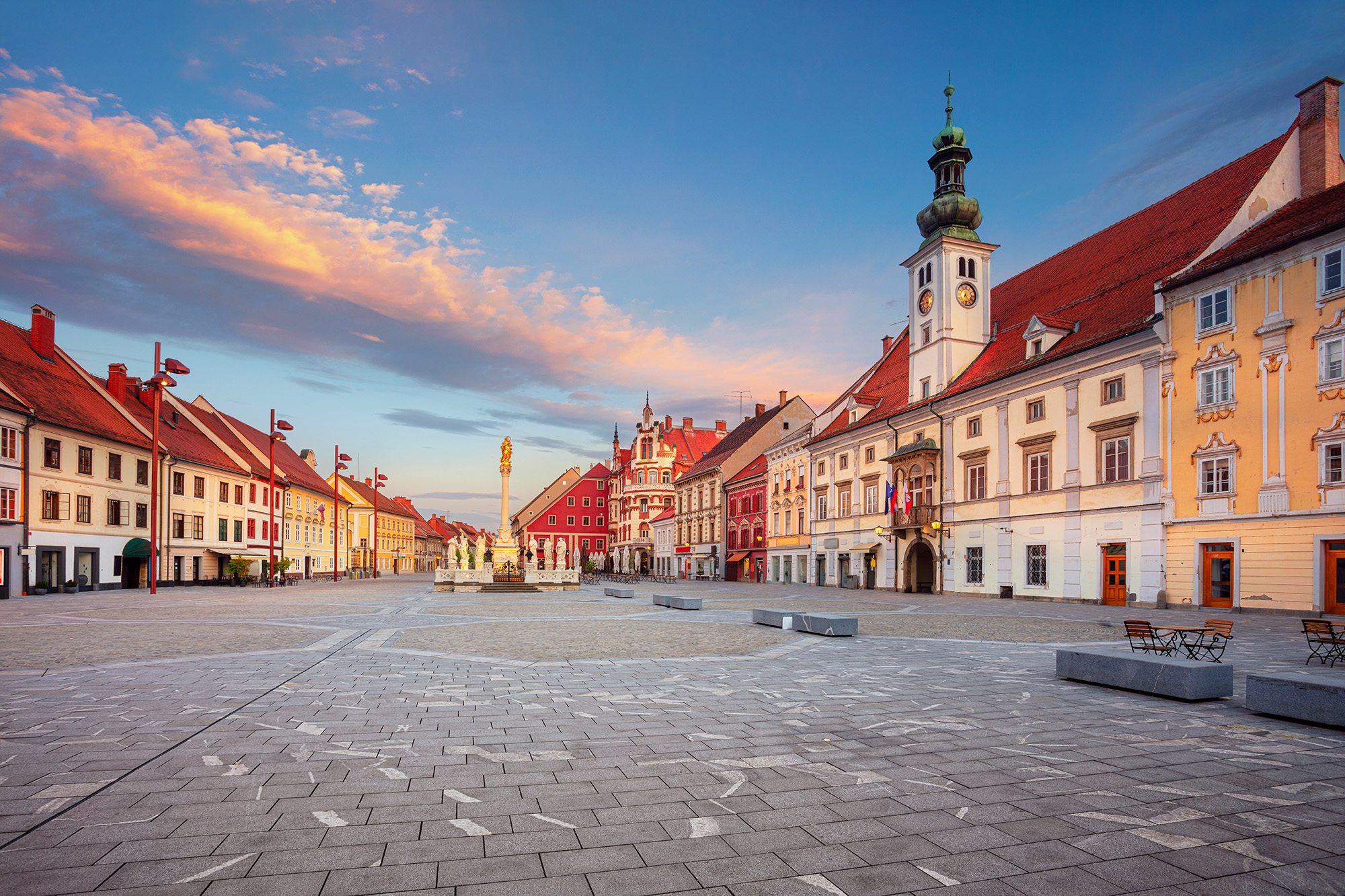
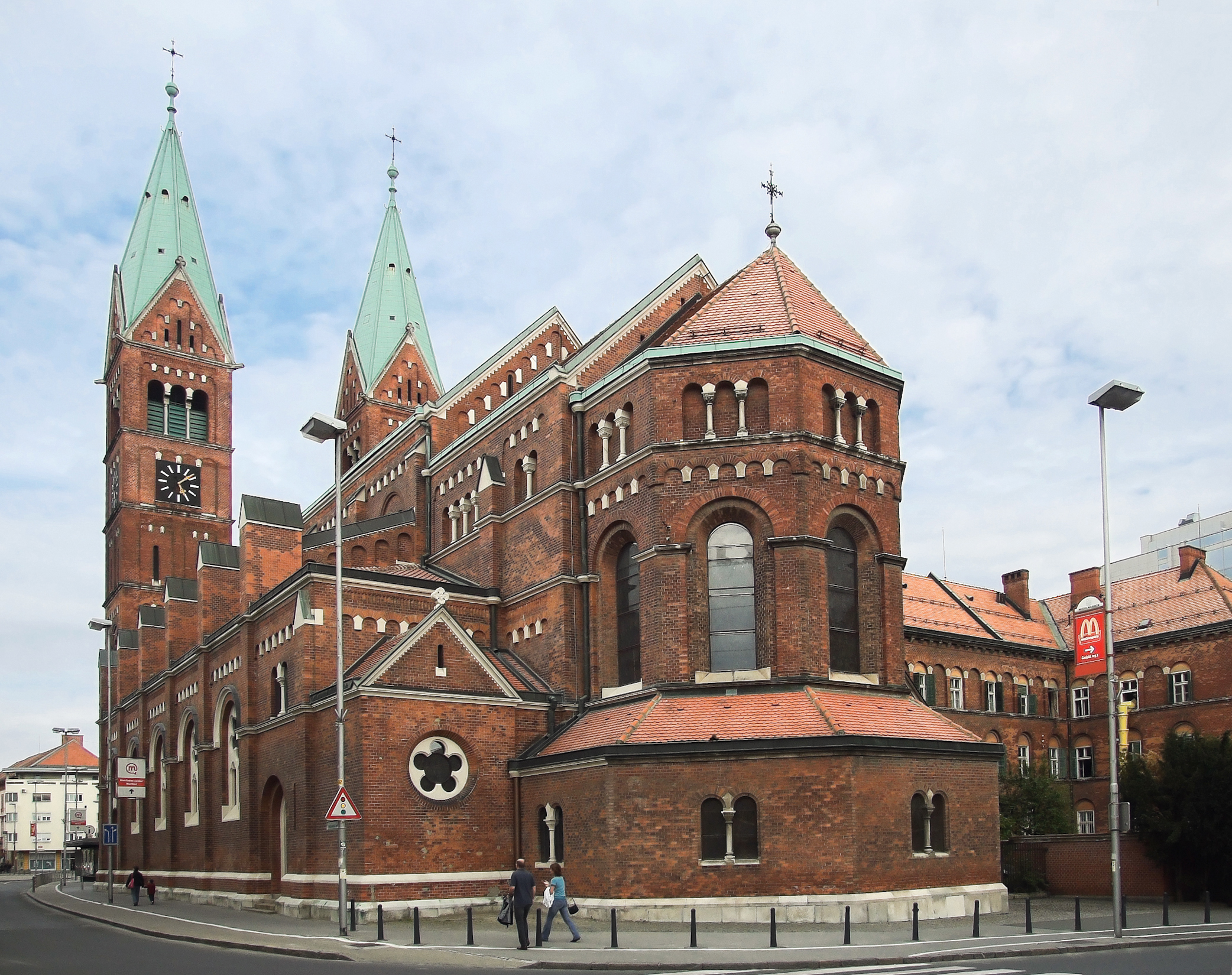
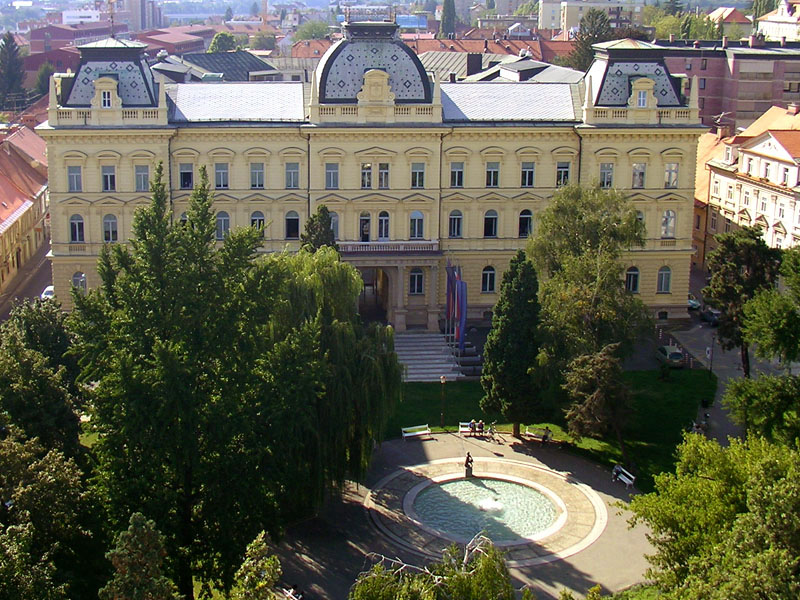
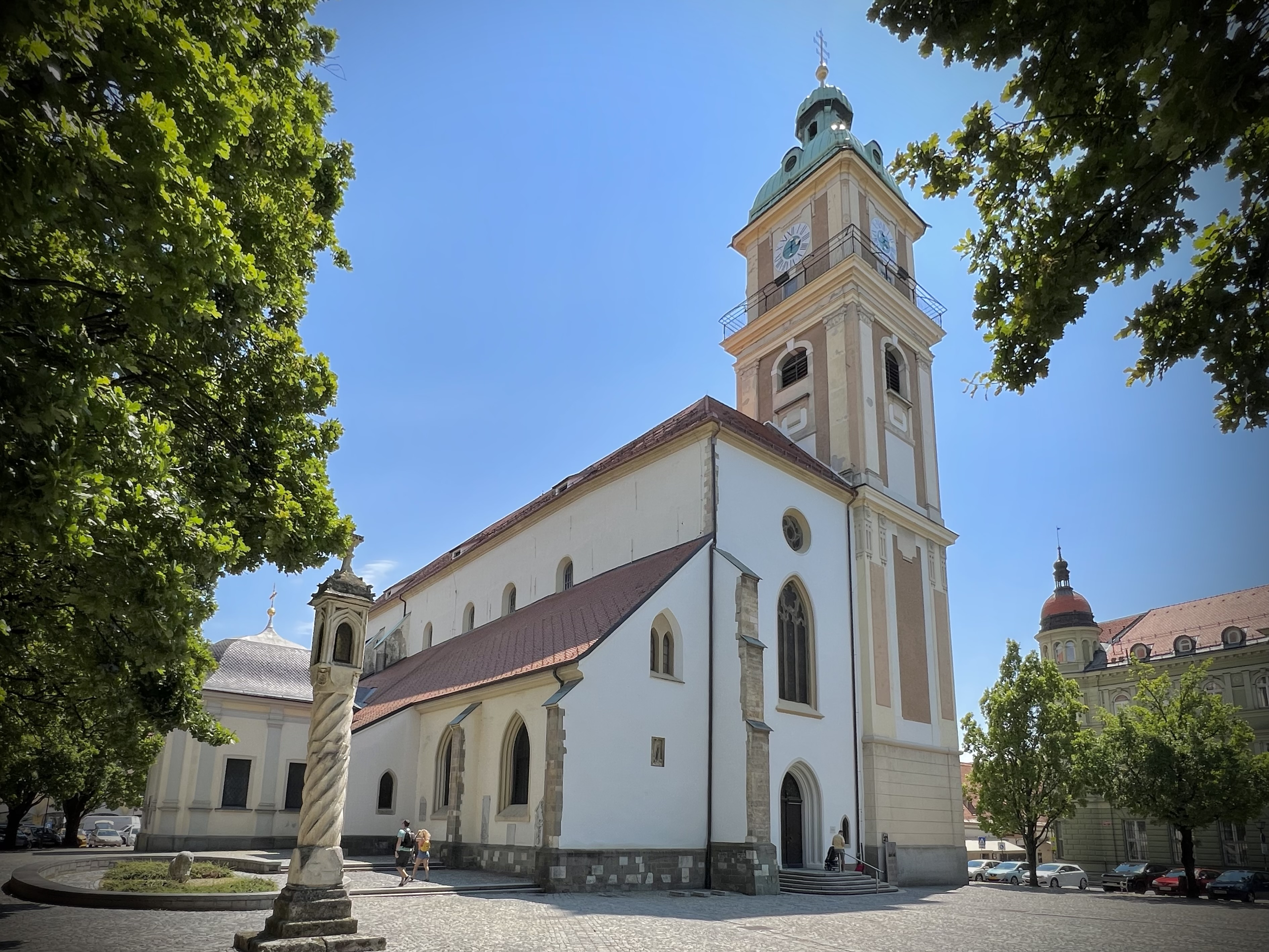
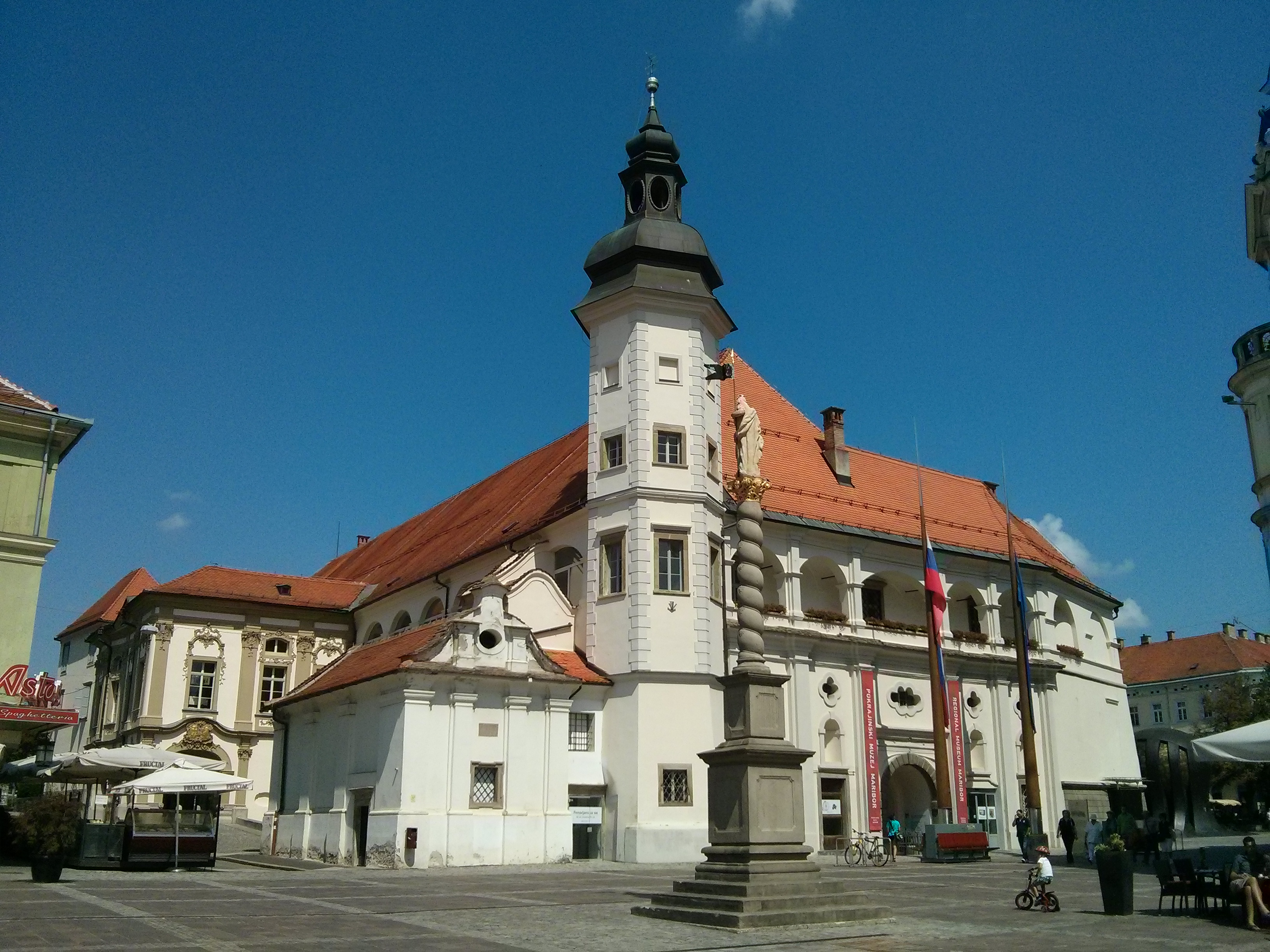
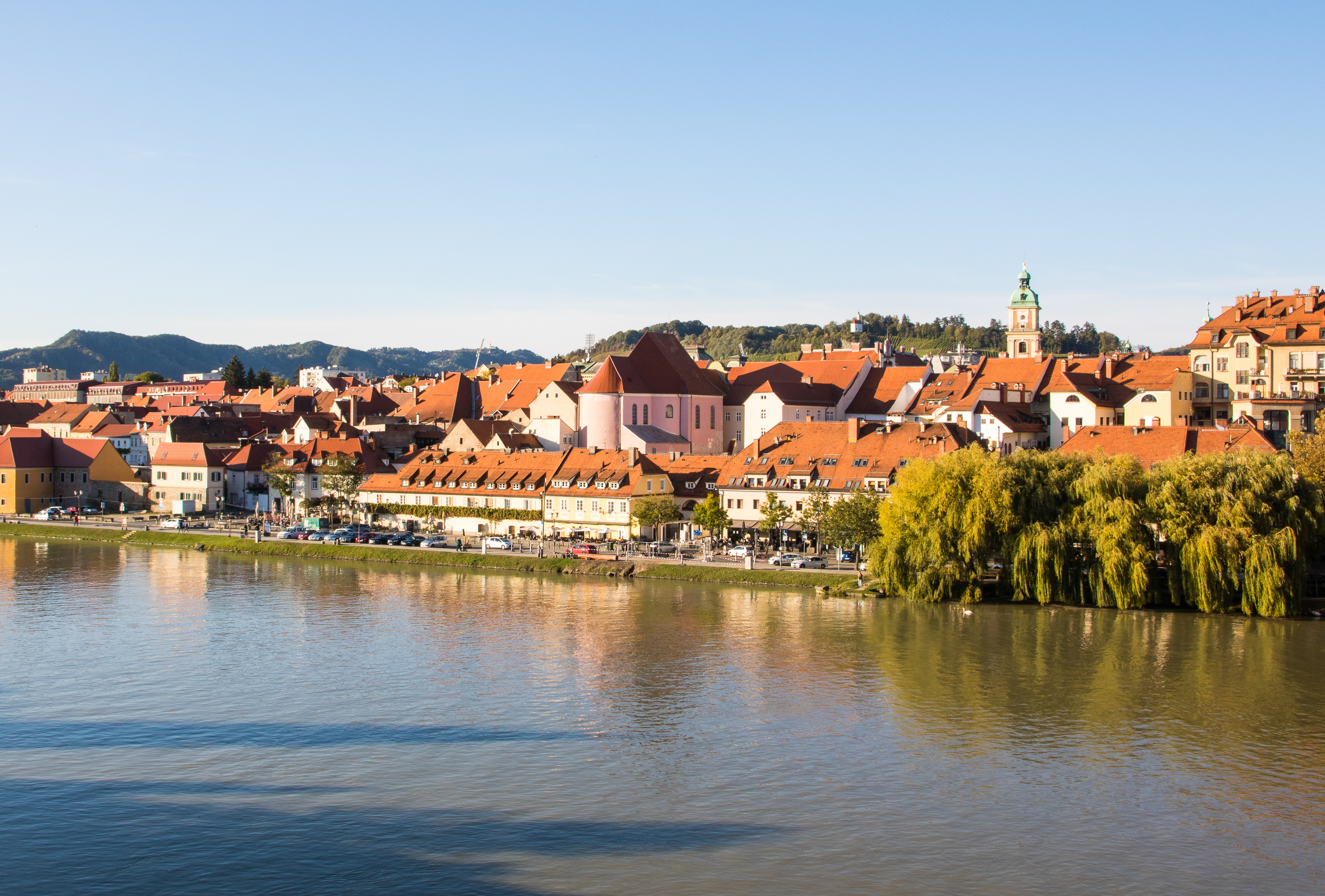
- Main Square with Town Hall Basilica of Our Mother of Mercy University of Maribor Maribor Cathedral Maribor Castle The Drava River and Lent

- Flag Coat of arms

- Location in Slovenia Maribor (Europe)
- Coordinates: 46°33′27″N 15°38′44″E
- Country: Slovenia
- Traditional region: Styria
- Statistical region: Drava
- Municipality: Maribor
- First mention: 1164
- Town privileges: 1254

Government
  - Mayor: Saša Arsenovič

Area
  - City: 40.98 km^{2} (15.82 sq mi)
  - Metro: 2,144 km^{2} (828 sq mi)
- Elevation: 274.7 m (901 ft)

Population (2025)
  - City: 97,522
  - Metro: 331,504
  - City Municipality: 114,301
- Demonym(s): Mariborčan (male), Mariborčanka (female)
- Time zone: UTC+01 (CET)
  - Summer (DST): UTC+02 (CEST)
- Postal code: 2000
- Area code: 02 (+386 2 if calling from abroad)
- Vehicle registration: MB
- Climate: Cfb
- Website: www.maribor.si

Maribor (UK: /ˈmærɪbɔːr/ MARR-ib-or, US: /ˈmɑːr-/ MAR-, Slovene: [ˈmáːɾibɔɾ]; also known by other historical names) is the second-largest city in Slovenia and the largest city of the traditional region of Lower Styria. It is the seat of the Urban Municipality of Maribor and the Drava Statistical Region. Maribor is also the economic, administrative, educational, and cultural centre of eastern Slovenia.

Maribor was first mentioned as a castle in 1164, as a settlement in 1209, and as a city in 1254. Like most Slovene ethnic territory, Maribor was under Habsburg rule until 1918, when Rudolf Maister and his men secured the city for the State of Slovenes, Croats and Serbs, which then joined the Kingdom of Serbia to form the Kingdom of Yugoslavia. In 1991 Maribor became part of independent Slovenia.

Maribor, along with the Portuguese city of Guimarães, was selected as the European Capital of Culture for 2012.

== Name ==
Maribor was attested in historical sources as Marpurch c. 1145 (and later as Marchburch, Marburc, and Marchpurch), and is a compound of Middle High German march 'march (borderland)' + burc 'fortress'. In modern times, the town's German name is Marburg an der Drau (pronounced [ˈmaʁbʊʁk ʔan deːɐ̯ ˈdʁaʊ̯]; literally, 'Marburg on the Drava').

The Slovene name Maribor is an artificial Slovenized creation, coined by Stanko Vraz in 1836. Vraz created the name in the spirit of Illyrianism by analogy with the name Brandenburg (cf. Lower Sorbian Bramborska). Locally, the town was known in Slovene as Marprk or Marprog. The name Maribor was accepted among Slovenes in 1861, when Lovro Toman published a song named Mar i bor, giving the name a Slovene compound Mar ('to care') + i ('and') + bor ('to fight for'). In addition to its Slovene and German names, the city is also known as Marburgum in Latin and Marburgo in Italian.

== History ==
Historical affiliations

Archbishop of Salzburg (1164–1555)
Habsburg Monarchy (1555–1804)
Austrian Empire (1804–1867)
Austria-Hungary (1867–1918)
State of Slovenes, Croats and Serbs (1918)
Kingdom of Yugoslavia (1918–1941)
Nazi Germany (1941–1945; annexed)
SFR Yugoslavia (1945–1991)
Slovenia 1991–Present

=== Prehistory ===
The oldest known remnants of settlement in the Maribor area date back to the 5th millennium BC, at the time of the Chalcolithic. With the construction of Maribor's western bypass, larger settlements were discovered dating from the 44th to 42nd century BC. Another settlement from around the same period was also discovered in Spodnje Hoče, a town right next to Maribor and another below Melje Hill near Malečnik. Another settlement below Melje Hill was also found dating to the 4th millennium BC.

A more intense period of settlement of the Maribor area occurred in the 3rd millennium BC with the advent of the Bronze Age. In the 13th to 12th century BC, in the age of the Urnfield culture, new settlements were found in Pekel. Around 1000 BC, new settlers moved to the Maribor area. An urnfield cemetery was found from that period in today's Mladinska ulica and another necropolis was also found in Pobrežje.

=== Antiquity ===
With the Iron Age and the Hallstatt Culture, new settlements began to appear on hills. One of them was Poštela in the Pohorje Mountains. Poštela was an old town that was abandoned in the 6th century BC and inhabited again in the 2nd century BC.

During Roman times, the area where Maribor later developed was part of the province of Noricum, right on the border with Pannonia. During that period, Roman agricultural estates known as villae rusticae filled the area around Radvanje, Betnava, Bohova, and Hoče. The best-known of them was in today's Borova Vas neighborhood of Maribor. An important trade route was also established in the area, connecting Celeia and Flavia Solva in one direction with Poetovio and central Noricum on the other.

=== Medieval history ===
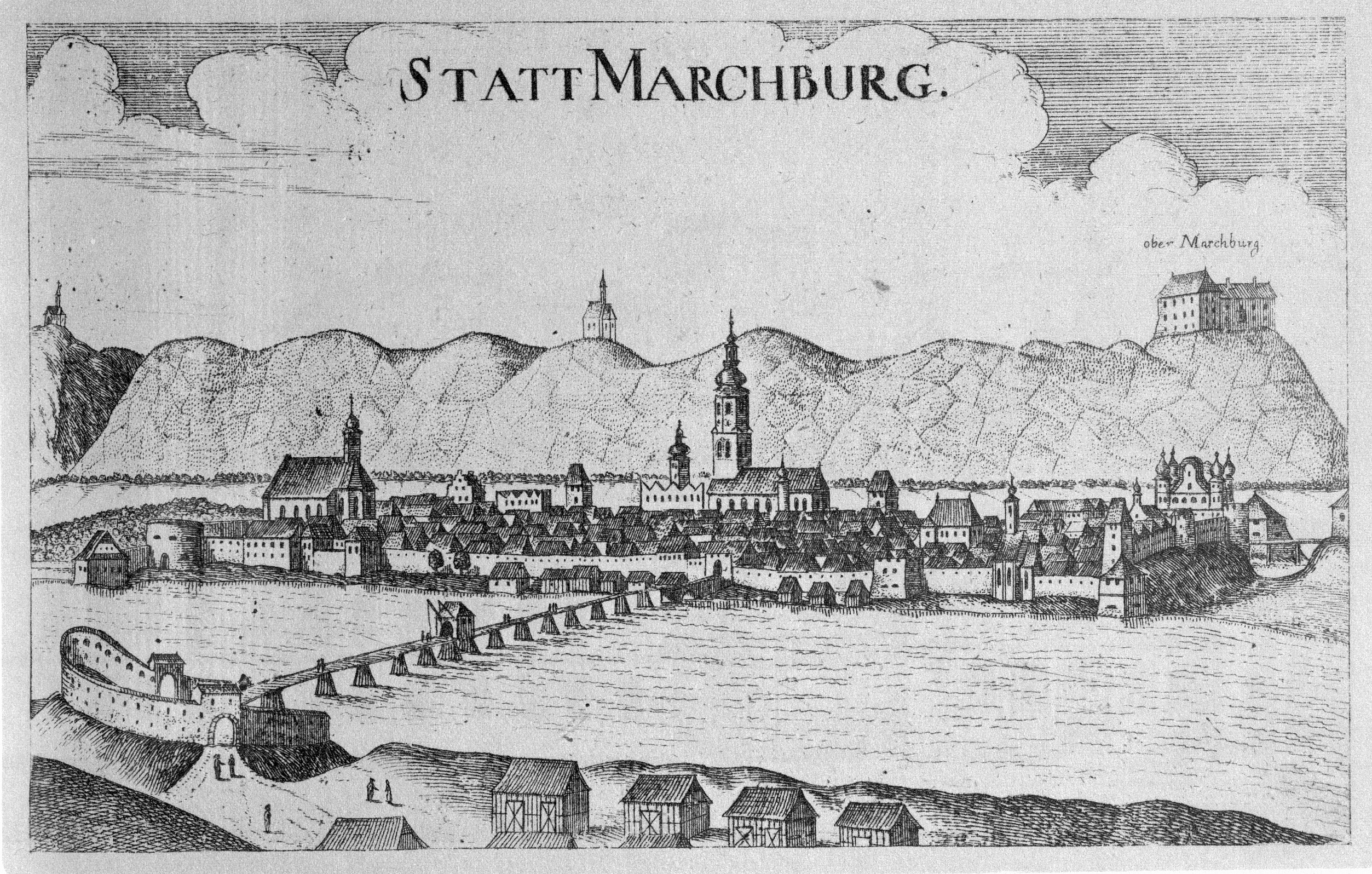
Maribor in the 17th century. A copper engraving by Georg Matthäus Vischer, 1678.

After the fall of the Roman Empire, the Maribor area was settled by the Slavs. A Slavic cemetery was found in Radvanje dating to the 10th century AD. The area of what later became Maribor was first part of Samo's Empire and later the area stood on the border between Carantania and Lower Pannonia. In 843 the area was absorbed into the Frankish Empire.

In the Frankish Empire, the area again stood on the border, this time between the Frankish Empire and the Principality of Hungary. To protect the Frankish Empire from Hungarian raids, a castle was built on Pyramid Hill. The castle was mentioned for the first time on 20 October 1164 as Castrum Marchburch. A settlement soon began to grow below the castle. Maribor was first mentioned as a market near the castle in 1204, and it received town privileges in 1254. It is likely that the castle stood before 1164 because Bernard of Trixien, the count of the region, already used the title Bernhard von Marchpurg 'Bernard of Maribor' in 1124.

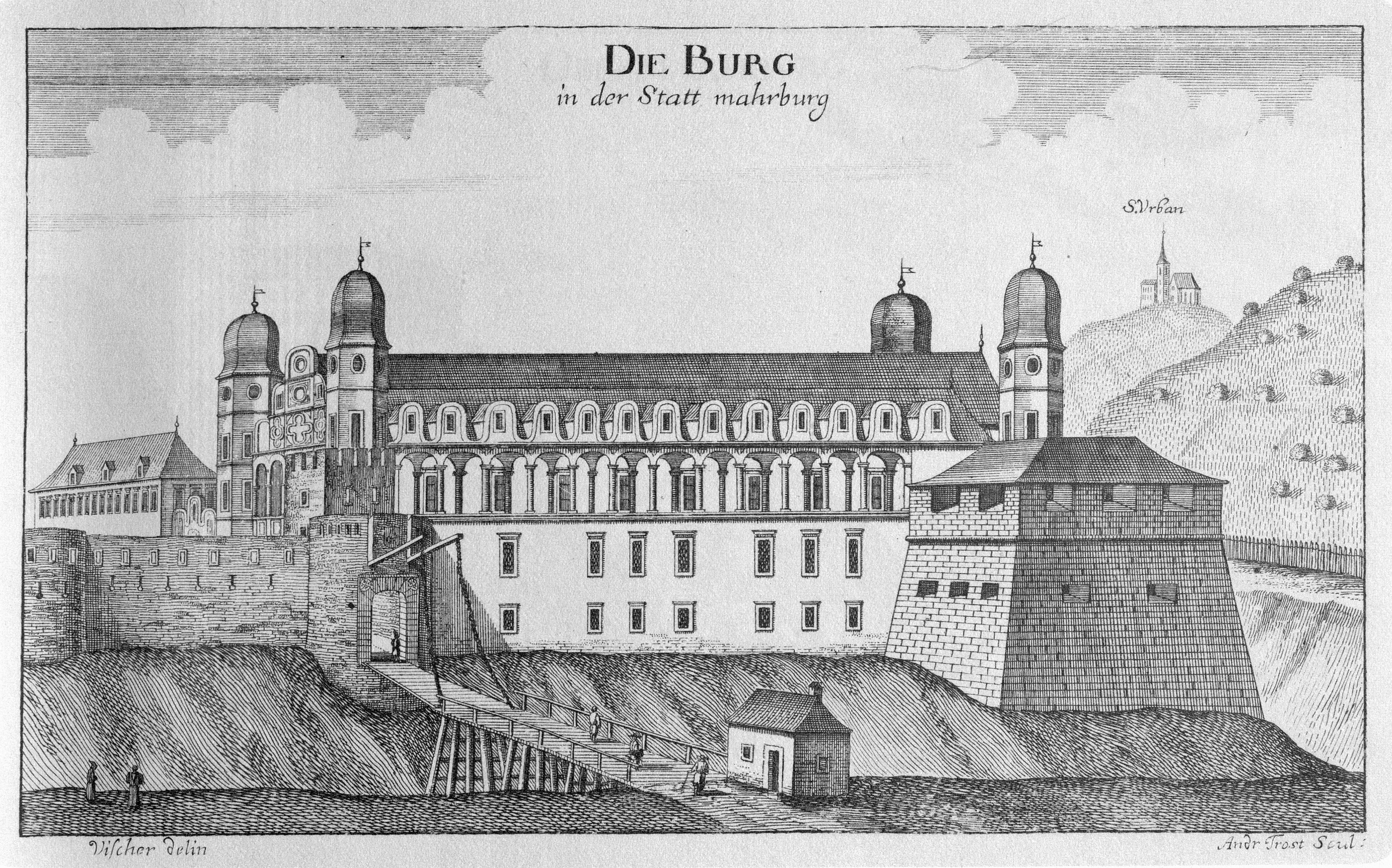
Maribor Castle. A copper engraving by Georg Matthäus Vischer.

The town began to grow rapidly after the victory of Rudolf I of the Habsburg dynasty over King Otakar II of Bohemia in 1278. The town built fortifications, and trade, viticulture, and crafts started to grow. The town had a monopoly over the entire region and also controlled the viticulture trade with Carinthia. The first churches were built, and also around this time the first Jews arrived. The Jews built their own ghetto in the southeastern part of town, where they also built the Maribor Synagogue. Most Slovenians lived in the northwestern part of town on what is now Slovenian Street (Slovenska ulica).

In 1478, a second castle was built on the northeastern side of the town, today known as Maribor Castle. In 1480 and in 1481, Matthias Corvinus besieged the town but failed to conquer it on both occasions. In 1496, Maximilian I issued a decree to expel all Jews from Maribor and Styria. In 1515, the Maribor Town Hall was built and a few years later, in 1532, Maribor again came under siege, this time by the Ottoman Empire. In the battle that became known as the Siege of Maribor, a 100,000-strong Ottoman army under the leadership of Suleiman the Magnificent attacked the town, which was defended only by the local garrison and its citizens. Despite all the odds, Maribor was defended and the legend of the Maribor shoemaker who raised the sluice gates and flooded the Ottoman army is still popular today.

=== Modern period ===
In the 17th century, numerous fires razed the town. The biggest ones occurred in 1601, 1645, 1648, and 1700. As a consequence, the town was rebuilt numerous times. In addition to fires, the plague decimated the town's population. The largest plague epidemics occurred in 1646, 1664, and 1680. Due to the plague, the town lost 35 percent of its population. In gratitude for the end of the plague, a plague column was built in 1681, with the original being replaced in 1743. In 1846, the Southern Railway was built through the town, which resulted in great economic growth and territorial expansion. In 1859, Anton Martin Slomšek, a bishop of the Diocese of Lavant, transferred the seat of the diocese to Maribor, and he further encouraged the use of Slovene. With the transfer, Maribor also received its first higher school. Four years later, Maribor was connected with Carinthia with the construction of the railway from Maribor to Prevalje. The first daily Slovenian newspaper, called Slovenski narod, was established in 1868 on today's Slomšek Square (Slomškov trg). On 4 April 1883, the first electric light in Slovene ethnic territory was installed on Castle Square (Grajski trg). The renowned electrical engineer Nikola Tesla lived in Maribor from 1878 to 1879, where he received his first job. Maribor National Hall was built in 1899, and it became a political, cultural, and economic centre for all Styrian Slovenes.

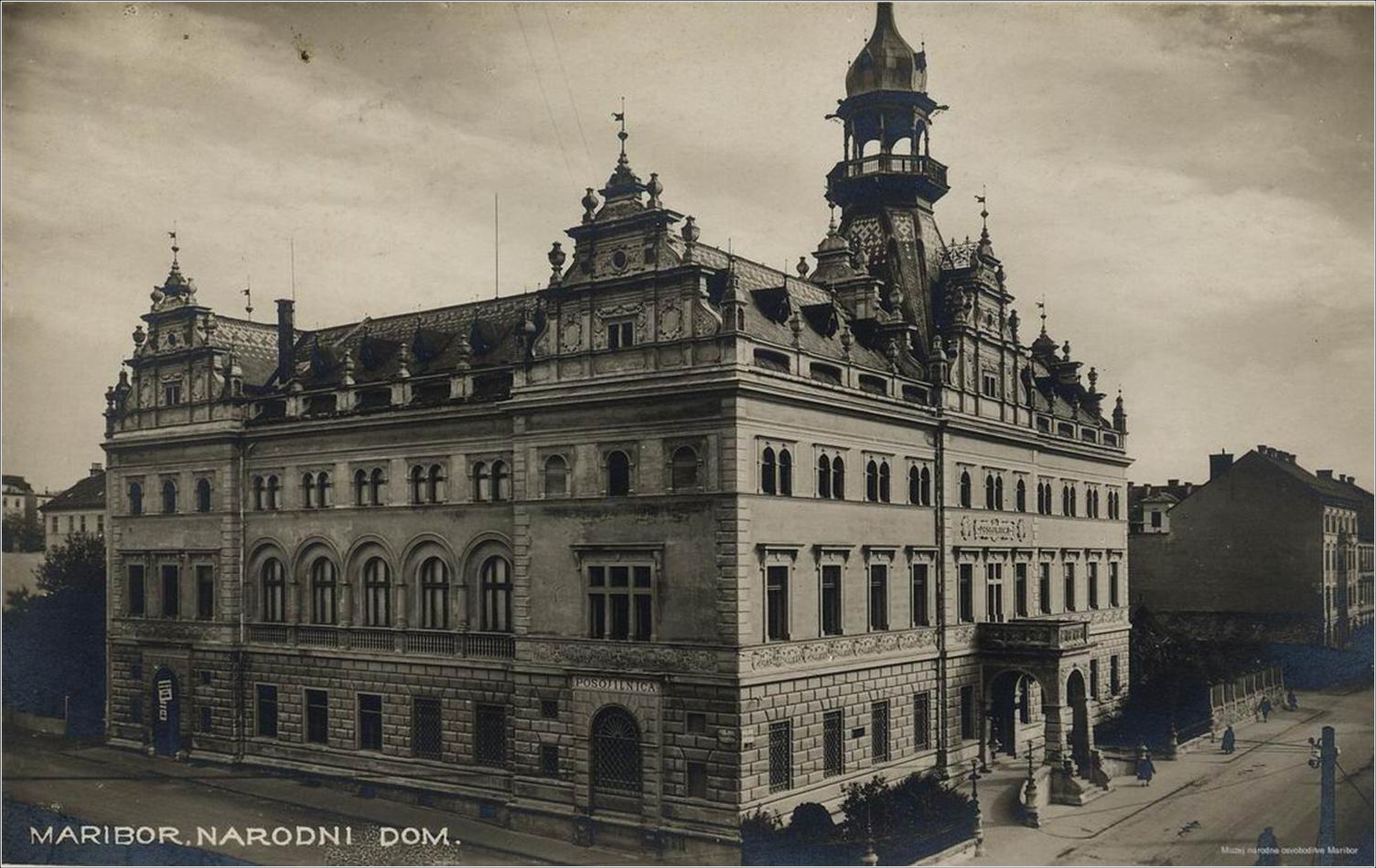
Postcard of Maribor National Hall.

In 1900, the city itself had a population that was 82.3% Austrian German (19,298 people) and 17.3% Slovene (4,062 people; based on the language spoken at home); most of the city's capital and public life was in Austrian German hands. However, the county excluding the city had only 10,199 Austrian Germans and 78,888 Slovene inhabitants, meaning the city was completely surrounded by majority-Slovene ethnic territory. Some former independent settlements that later became part of the city had more ethnic Slovenes than Austrian Germans (e.g., Krčevina, Radvanje, Tezno), whereas others had more Austrian Germans than ethnic Slovenes (e.g., Pobrežje and Studenci). In 1913, a new bridge was opened over the Drava River, today known as the Old Bridge. In World War I, the 47th Infantry Regiment of the Austro-Hungarian Army was based in the city and also fought on the Isonzo front. During the First World War many Slovenes in Carinthia and Styria were detained on suspicion of being enemies of the Austrian Empire. This led to distrust between Austrian Germans and Slovenes.

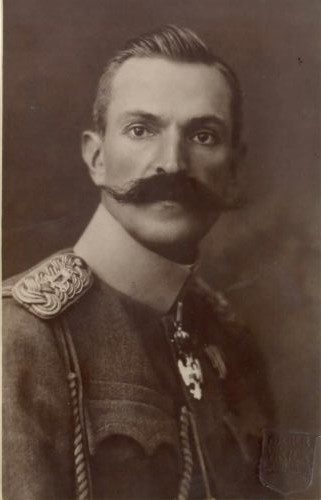
Rudolf Maister

After the collapse of the Austrian-Hungarian Empire in 1918, Maribor was claimed by both the State of Slovenes, Croats and Serbs and German Austria. On 1 November 1918, a meeting was held by Colonel Anton Holik in the Melje barracks, where it was decided that the city would be part of German Austria. Ethnic Slovene Major Rudolf Maister, who was present at the meeting, denounced the decision and organised Slovenian military units that were able to seize control of the city. All Austrian officers and soldiers were disarmed and demobilised to the new state of German Austria. The German city council then held a secret meeting, where it was decided to do whatever possible to regain Maribor for German Austria. They organised a military unit called the Green Guard (Schutzwehr), and approximately 400 well-armed soldiers of this unit opposed the pro-Slovenian and pro-Yugoslav Major Maister. Slovenian troops surprised and disarmed the Green Guard early on the morning of 23 November. Thereafter, the city remained in Slovenian hands.

On 27 January 1919, Austrian Germans gathered to await the United States peace delegation at the city's marketplace were fired upon by Slovenian troops. Nine citizens were killed and eighteen were seriously wounded; who had actually ordered the shooting has never been unequivocally established. German sources accused Maister's troops of shooting without cause. In turn Slovene witnesses such as Maks Pohar claimed that the Austrian Germans attacked the Slovenian soldiers guarding the town hall, one even discharging a revolver and hitting one Slovenian soldier in the bayonet. The German-language media called the incident Marburg's Bloody Sunday. As Maribor was now firmly in the hands of the Slovenian forces and surrounded completely by Slovenian territory; the city had been recognised as part of the Kingdom of Serbs, Croats and Slovenes without a plebiscite in the Treaty of Saint-Germain of 10 September 1919 between the victors and German Austria. For his actions in Maribor and later in the Austro-Slovene conflict in Carinthia, Rudolf Maister is today considered a Slovenian national hero.

After 1918, most of Maribor's Austrian Germans left the Kingdom of Serbs, Croats and Slovenes for Austria. A policy of cultural assimilation was pursued in Yugoslavia against the Austrian German minority similar to the Germanization policy followed by Austria against its Slovene minority in Carinthia. From 1922 to 1929, Maribor was the seat of the Maribor Oblast, a subdivision within Yugoslavia and was later part of the Drava Banovina. Up until World War II, Maribor was considered the fastest-developing city in the country.

=== World War II and aftermath ===
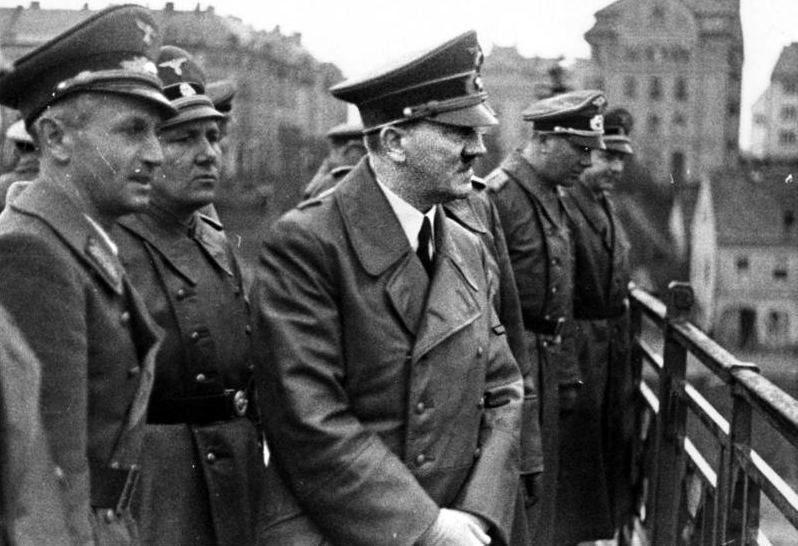
Adolf Hitler on the Old Bridge in Maribor, Yugoslavia in 1941

In 1941 Lower Styria, the predominantly Slovene part of Styria, was annexed by Nazi Germany. German troops marched into the town at 9 pm on 8 April 1941. On 26 April Adolf Hitler, who encouraged his followers to "make this land German again", visited Maribor and a grand reception was organised in the city castle by the local Germans. Immediately after the occupation, Nazi Germany began mass expulsions of Slovenes to the Independent State of Croatia, Serbia, and later to the concentration and work camps in Germany. The Nazi goal was to Germanize the population of Lower Styria after the war. Slovene patriots were taken hostage and many were later shot in the prisons of Maribor and Graz. This led to organised resistance by Slovene partisans. The first act of resistance in Maribor and occupied Slovenia occurred only three days after Hitler's visit, when Slovene communists and SKOJ members burned two German cars.

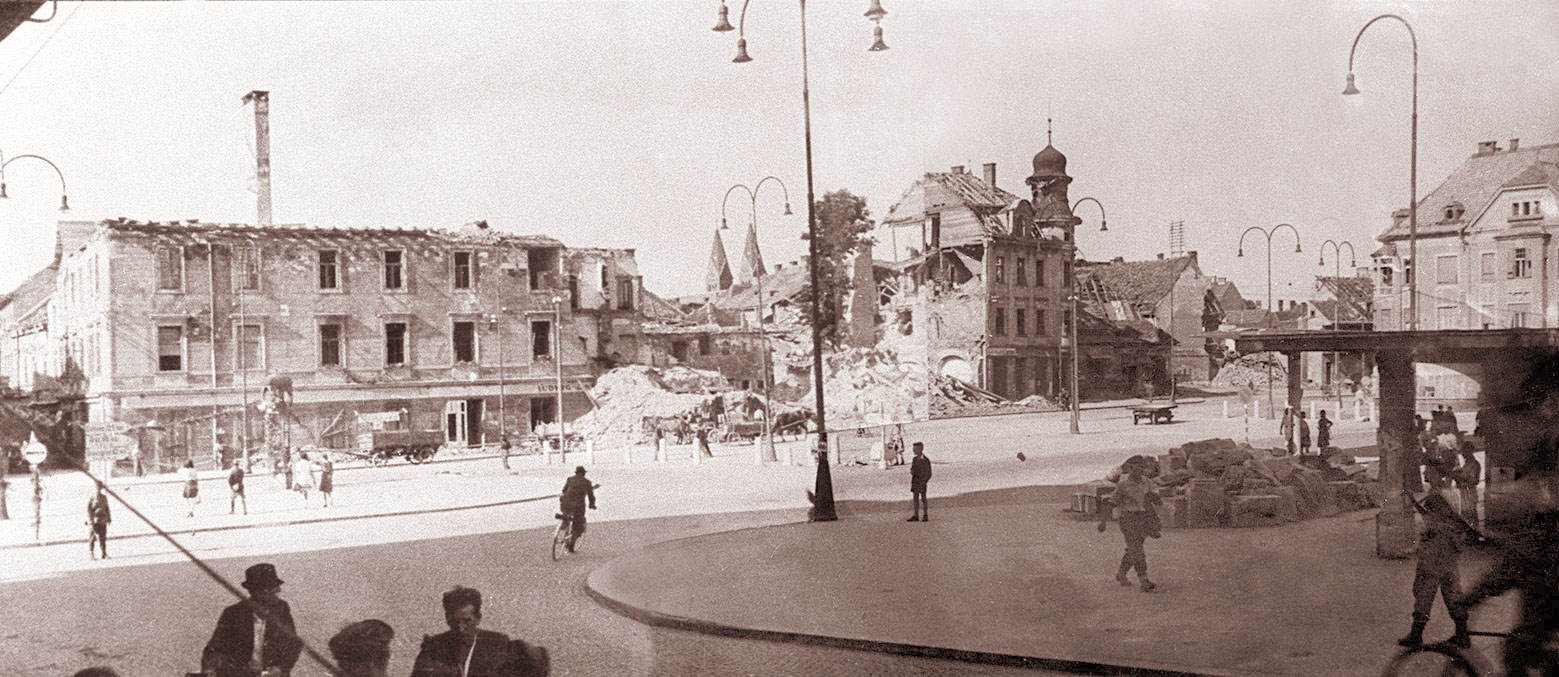
Maribor in ruins, 1945

Maribor was the site of a German prisoner-of-war camp from 1941 to 1945 for many British, Australian, and New Zealand troops who had been captured in Crete in 1941. In 1944, the largest mass rescue of POWs of the war in Europe took place when 105 Allied prisoners from the camp were freed by Slovene partisans in the Raid at Ožbalt. The city, a major industrial centre with an extensive armament industry, was systematically bombed by the Allies in the closing years of World War II. A total of 29 bombing raids devastated some 47% of the city area, killing 483 civilians and leaving over 4,200 people homeless. Over 2,600 people died in Maribor during the war. By the end of the war, Maribor was the most war-damaged major town of Yugoslavia. The remaining German-speaking population, except those who had actively supported the resistance during the war, was summarily expelled at the end of the war in May 1945. At the same time Croatian Home Guard members and their relatives who tried to escape from Yugoslavia were executed by the Yugoslav Army. The existence of nine mass graves in and near Maribor was revealed after Slovenia's independence.

=== Contemporary history ===
After the Second World War, Maribor became part of SR Slovenia, within SFR Yugoslavia. A major process of renewal and reconstruction began in the city. Maribor soon after became the industrial centre of Slovenia and the whole of Yugoslavia, hosting many known companies such as the Maribor Automobile Factory among others. The first clash between the Yugoslav People's Army and the Slovenian Territorial Defence in Slovenia's war of independence happened in nearby Pekre and on the streets of Maribor, resulting in the conflict's first casualty. After Slovenia seceded from Yugoslavia in 1991, the loss of the Yugoslav market severely strained the city's economy, which was based on heavy industry. The city saw a record unemployment rate of nearly 25%.

The economic situation of Maribor after the mid-1990s crisis worsened again with the onset of global economic crisis combined with the European sovereign-debt crisis, which was one of the causes for the beginning of 2012–13 Maribor protests which spread into 2012–2013 Slovenian protests. In 2012, Maribor was one of the two European Capitals of Culture, and the following year, Maribor was the European Youth Capital.

== Geography ==
Panorama of Maribor with bridges and river Drava

=== Topography ===
On the Drava River lies Maribor Island (Mariborski otok). The oldest public bath, still an important and often visited place in Maribor, is located on the island.

There are two hills in Maribor: Calvary Hill and Pyramid Hill, both surrounded by vineyards. The latter dominates the northern border of the city. Ruins of the first Maribor castle from the 11th century and a chapel from the 19th century also stand there. The hill offers an easily accessible scenic overlook of Maribor and the countryside to the south over the Drava River.

=== City districts ===
The city of Maribor is divided into 11 districts (Slovene: mestne četrti) of the City Municipality of Maribor. The Drava River separates the districts of Center, Koroška Vrata, and Ivan Cankar to the north from other districts south of it. The various city districts are connected by four road bridges, a rail bridge, and a pedestrian bridge.

1. Brezje–Dogoše–Zrkovci
2. Center
3. Ivan Cankar
4. Koroška Vrata
5. Magdalena
6. Nova Vas
7. Pobrežje
8. Radvanje
9. Studenci
10. Tabor
11. Tezno

=== Climate ===
Maribor has a humid continental climate (Köppen climate classification: Dfb), bordering on oceanic climate (Köppen: Cfb). Average temperatures hover around zero degrees Celsius during the winter. Summers are generally warm. Average temperatures during the city's warmest month (July) exceed 20 degrees Celsius, which is one of the main reasons for the Maribor wine tradition. The city sees on average roughly 900 mm (35.4 in) of precipitation annually and it's one of the sunniest Slovene cities, with an average of 266 sunny days throughout the course of the year. The most recent temperature heatwave record for August is 40.6 °C, measured at the Maribor–Tabor weather station by the Slovenian Environment Agency (ARSO) on 8 August 2013.

Climate data for Maribor Edvard Rusjan Airport (1991–2020 normals, extremes 1950–2020)
Month	Jan	Feb	Mar	Apr	May	Jun	Jul	Aug	Sep	Oct	Nov	Dec	Year
Record high °C (°F)	17.8 (64.0)	21.4 (70.5)	25.5 (77.9)	28.9 (84.0)	32.1 (89.8)	36.2 (97.2)	37.7 (99.9)	39.7 (103.5)	32.7 (90.9)	27.0 (80.6)	25.7 (78.3)	19.5 (67.1)	39.7 (103.5)
Mean daily maximum °C (°F)	4.2 (39.6)	6.9 (44.4)	11.8 (53.2)	16.9 (62.4)	21.4 (70.5)	25.3 (77.5)	27.1 (80.8)	26.7 (80.1)	21.4 (70.5)	16.1 (61.0)	9.9 (49.8)	4.6 (40.3)	16.0 (60.8)
Daily mean °C (°F)	0.0 (32.0)	1.7 (35.1)	6.0 (42.8)	11.0 (51.8)	15.6 (60.1)	19.5 (67.1)	21.0 (69.8)	20.4 (68.7)	15.5 (59.9)	10.7 (51.3)	5.7 (42.3)	0.8 (33.4)	10.7 (51.3)
Mean daily minimum °C (°F)	−3.8 (25.2)	−2.9 (26.8)	0.7 (33.3)	5.0 (41.0)	9.6 (49.3)	13.3 (55.9)	14.7 (58.5)	14.4 (57.9)	10.4 (50.7)	6.2 (43.2)	2.1 (35.8)	−2.8 (27.0)	5.6 (42.1)
Record low °C (°F)	−26.3 (−15.3)	−26.1 (−15.0)	−23.9 (−11.0)	−9.5 (14.9)	−4.5 (23.9)	0.5 (32.9)	3.5 (38.3)	4.5 (40.1)	−1.7 (28.9)	−6.6 (20.1)	−17.4 (0.7)	−24.1 (−11.4)	−26.3 (−15.3)
Average precipitation mm (inches)	33 (1.3)	43 (1.7)	49 (1.9)	62 (2.4)	97 (3.8)	107 (4.2)	103 (4.1)	101 (4.0)	113 (4.4)	87 (3.4)	82 (3.2)	60 (2.4)	939 (37.0)
Average extreme snow depth cm (inches)	5 (2.0)	6 (2.4)	2 (0.8)	0 (0)	0 (0)	0 (0)	0 (0)	0 (0)	0 (0)	0 (0)	1 (0.4)	3 (1.2)	1.4 (0.6)
Average precipitation days (≥ 0.1 mm)	8	8	9	12	14	13	12	11	11	11	12	10	131
Mean monthly sunshine hours	83.4	112.8	155.0	195.8	240.2	256.9	277.5	259.2	183.9	141.5	80.4	68.6	2,055.2
Source 1: Slovenian Environment Agency (snow depth 1981–2010)
Source 2: NOAA (sun 1991–2020), Ogimet

Climate data for Maribor Vrbanski plato, 1991–2020 normals, extremes 1951–2020
Month	Jan	Feb	Mar	Apr	May	Jun	Jul	Aug	Sep	Oct	Nov	Dec	Year
Record high °C (°F)	17.3 (63.1)	23 (73)	25.4 (77.7)	28.7 (83.7)	33 (91)	35.6 (96.1)	37.8 (100.0)	39.8 (103.6)	32.9 (91.2)	27.3 (81.1)	23.6 (74.5)	20.1 (68.2)	39.8 (103.6)
Mean daily maximum °C (°F)	4.1 (39.4)	6.9 (44.4)	11.6 (52.9)	16.6 (61.9)	20.9 (69.6)	24.7 (76.5)	26.5 (79.7)	26.1 (79.0)	20.9 (69.6)	15.8 (60.4)	9.6 (49.3)	4.4 (39.9)	15.7 (60.2)
Daily mean °C (°F)	−0.1 (31.8)	1.6 (34.9)	5.7 (42.3)	10.4 (50.7)	14.8 (58.6)	18.6 (65.5)	20.3 (68.5)	19.8 (67.6)	14.9 (58.8)	10.2 (50.4)	5.4 (41.7)	0.7 (33.3)	10.2 (50.3)
Mean daily minimum °C (°F)	−3.8 (25.2)	−2.9 (26.8)	0.6 (33.1)	4.9 (40.8)	9.2 (48.6)	13.1 (55.6)	14.8 (58.6)	14.6 (58.3)	10.3 (50.5)	5.9 (42.6)	1.8 (35.2)	−2.8 (27.0)	5.5 (41.9)
Record low °C (°F)	−23 (−9)	−22.6 (−8.7)	−20.5 (−4.9)	−6.6 (20.1)	−5.5 (22.1)	1.1 (34.0)	4.1 (39.4)	3.9 (39.0)	−2.4 (27.7)	−6.9 (19.6)	−14.3 (6.3)	−21.8 (−7.2)	−23 (−9)
Average precipitation mm (inches)	31 (1.2)	42 (1.7)	49 (1.9)	63 (2.5)	101 (4.0)	104 (4.1)	101 (4.0)	111 (4.4)	116 (4.6)	89 (3.5)	83 (3.3)	59 (2.3)	949 (37.5)
Average snowfall cm (inches)	14 (5.5)	20 (7.9)	8 (3.1)	1 (0.4)	0 (0)	0 (0)	0 (0)	0 (0)	0 (0)	0.1 (0.0)	7 (2.8)	18 (7.1)	68.1 (26.8)
Average extreme snow depth cm (inches)	5 (2.0)	5 (2.0)	1 (0.4)	0 (0)	0 (0)	0 (0)	0 (0)	0 (0)	0 (0)	0 (0)	1 (0.4)	3 (1.2)	5 (2.0)
Average precipitation days (≥ 0.1 mm)	9	8	10	12	15	14	14	12	12	11	12	11	140
Average snowy days (≥ 1 cm)	3	3	2	0.3	0	0	0	0	0	0	1	3	12.3
Source: Slovenian Environment Agency (ARSO)

== Architecture ==
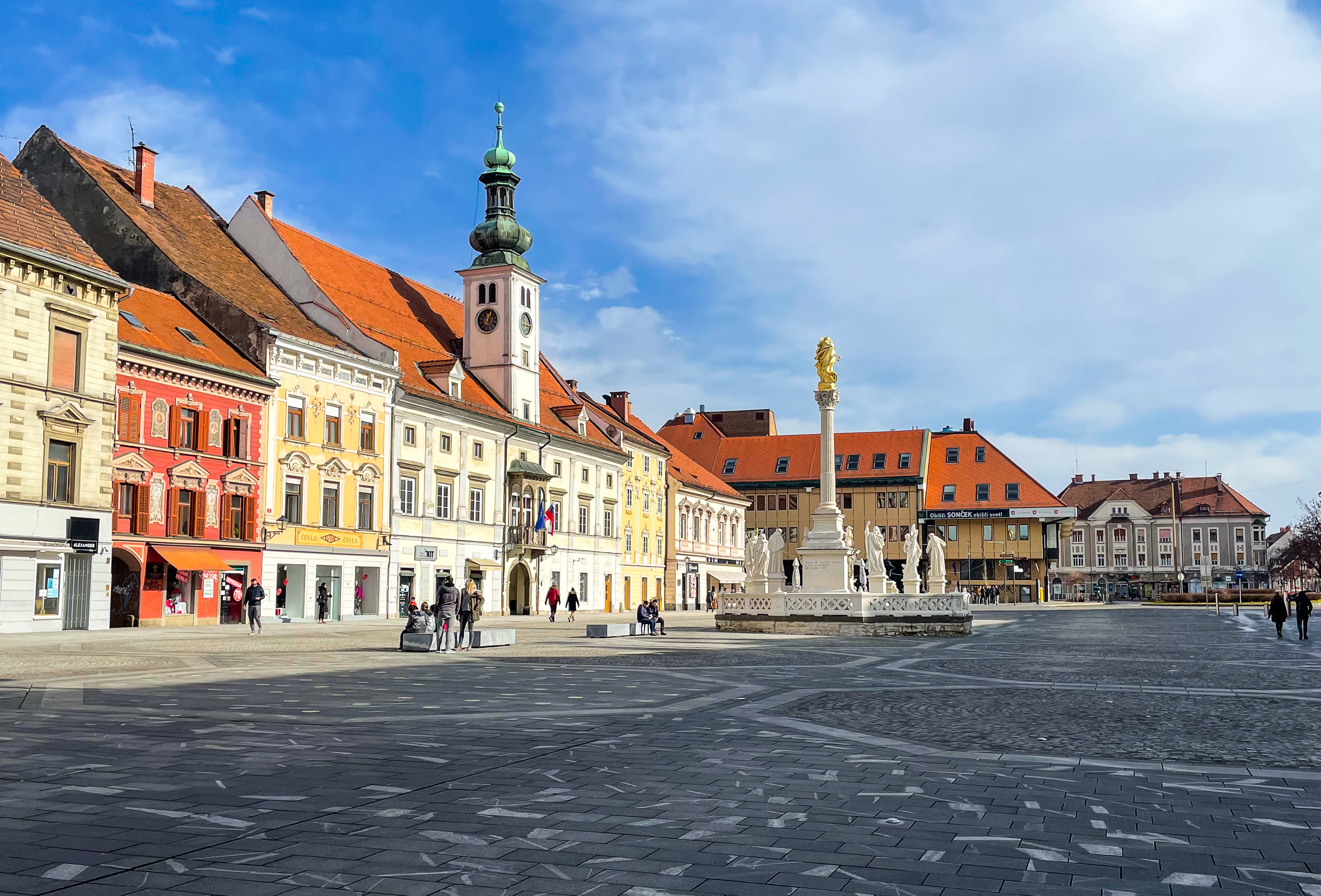
Main square with the Town Hall

Many historical structures stand in Maribor. Of the remains of city walls surrounding the old downtown, the most prominent are the Judgement Tower, the Water Tower, and the Jewish Tower. Maribor Cathedral was built in the Gothic style in the 13th century. Maribor Synagogue was built in the 14th century, and is the second oldest synagogue of Europe. Today it serves as a centre for cultural activities. Other prominent Medieval buildings are Maribor Castle, Betnava Castle, and the ruins of Upper Maribor Castle on Pyramid Hill. Town Hall was constructed in the Renaissance style, and the Plague Column in the Baroque style.

At the start of the 21st century, plans were made for a new modern business, residential and entertainment district, called the Drava Gate (Dravska vrata) and nicknamed the Maribor Manhattan. The project includes many new exclusive residential apartments, offices and conference halls, a green and recreational space, and other structures. It also includes a 111 m (364 ft) tall skyscraper that would be the tallest building in Slovenia. Due to lack of finances, the project has been postponed.

In 2008, the Studenci Footbridge (Studenška brv) was renovated according to the design of the Ponting company. The design was awarded that year at the 3rd International Footbridge Conference in Porto.

In 2010, Maribor organised an international architectural competition ECC Maribor 2012 – Drava 2012 to gather proposals for the design and reconstruction of the Drava banks, the construction of a new art gallery, and for a new footbridge. Its jury received about 400 proposals for the three different projects. The footbridge and the river embankments will be built in the near future, but the art gallery was replaced with a cultural center MAKS, which is currently under construction.

The construction of a new modern Faculty of Medicine started in 2011 near the Drava River. It was designed by architect Boris Podrecca and was completed in 2013.

There are plans to renovate the Maribor Public Library and Town Hall Square (Rotovški trg). In addition, the renovation of Maribor Island (Mariborski otok) in the Drava River has been planned.

== Parks and other green spaces ==
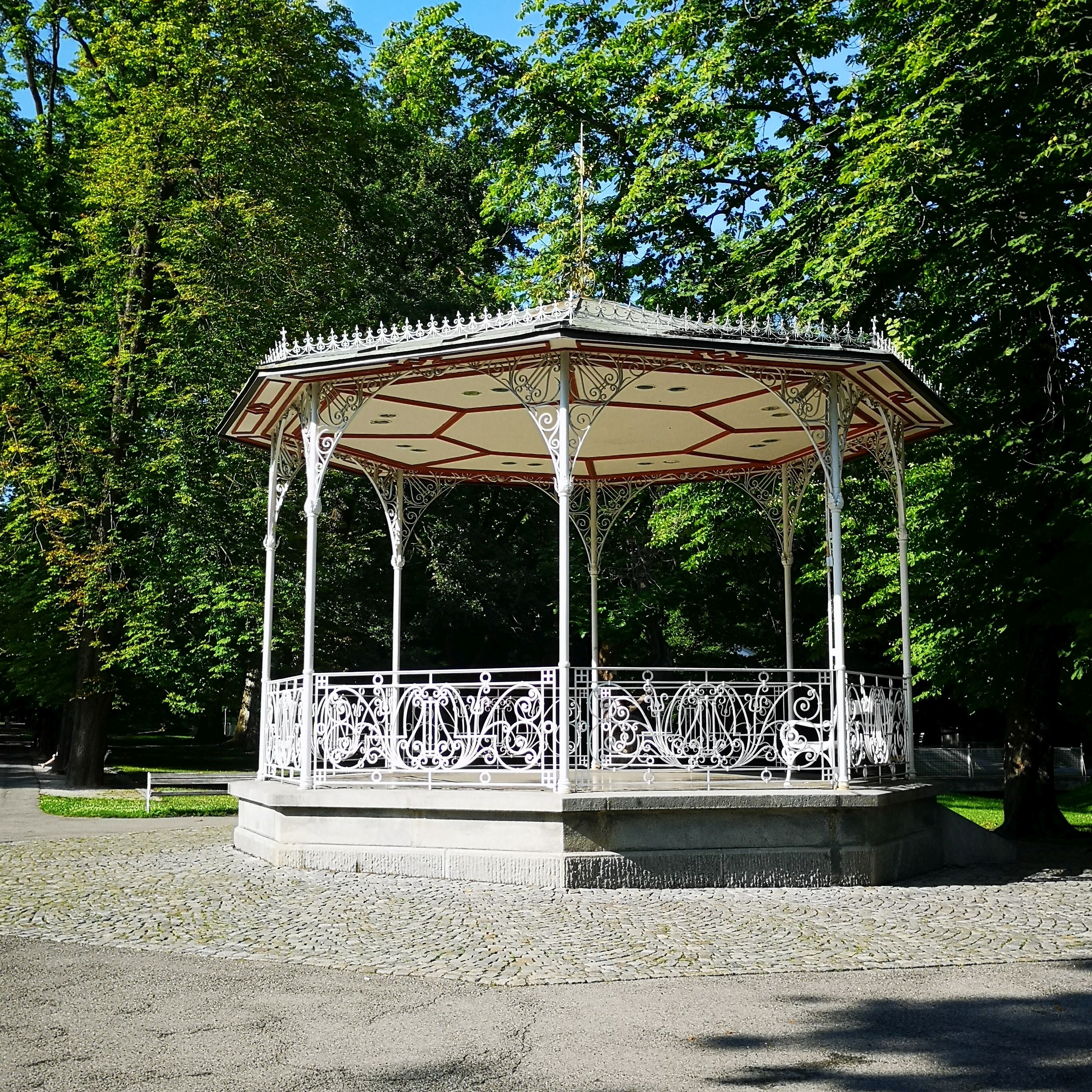
A park bandstand

The main park in the city is Maribor City Park, with the Maribor Aquarium and Terrarium, and a wide promenade leading to the Three Ponds, containing over a hundred local and foreign species of deciduous and coniferous trees.

== Demographics ==
Historical population
Year	Pop.	±%
1948	62,677	—
1953	70,815	+13.0%
1961	82,560	+16.6%
1971	96,895	+17.4%
1981	106,113	+9.5%
1991	103,961	−2.0%
2002	93,847	−9.7%
2011	95,171	+1.4%
2021	97,019	+1.9%
Source: SURS

=== Catholic Church ===
Maribor, previously in the Catholic Diocese of Graz-Seckau, became part of the Diocese of Lavant on 1 June 1859, and the seat of its Prince-Bishop. The name of the diocese (after a river in Carinthia) was later changed to the Diocese of Maribor on 5 March 1962. It was elevated to an archdiocese by Pope Benedict XVI on 7 April 2006.

=== Jewish community ===
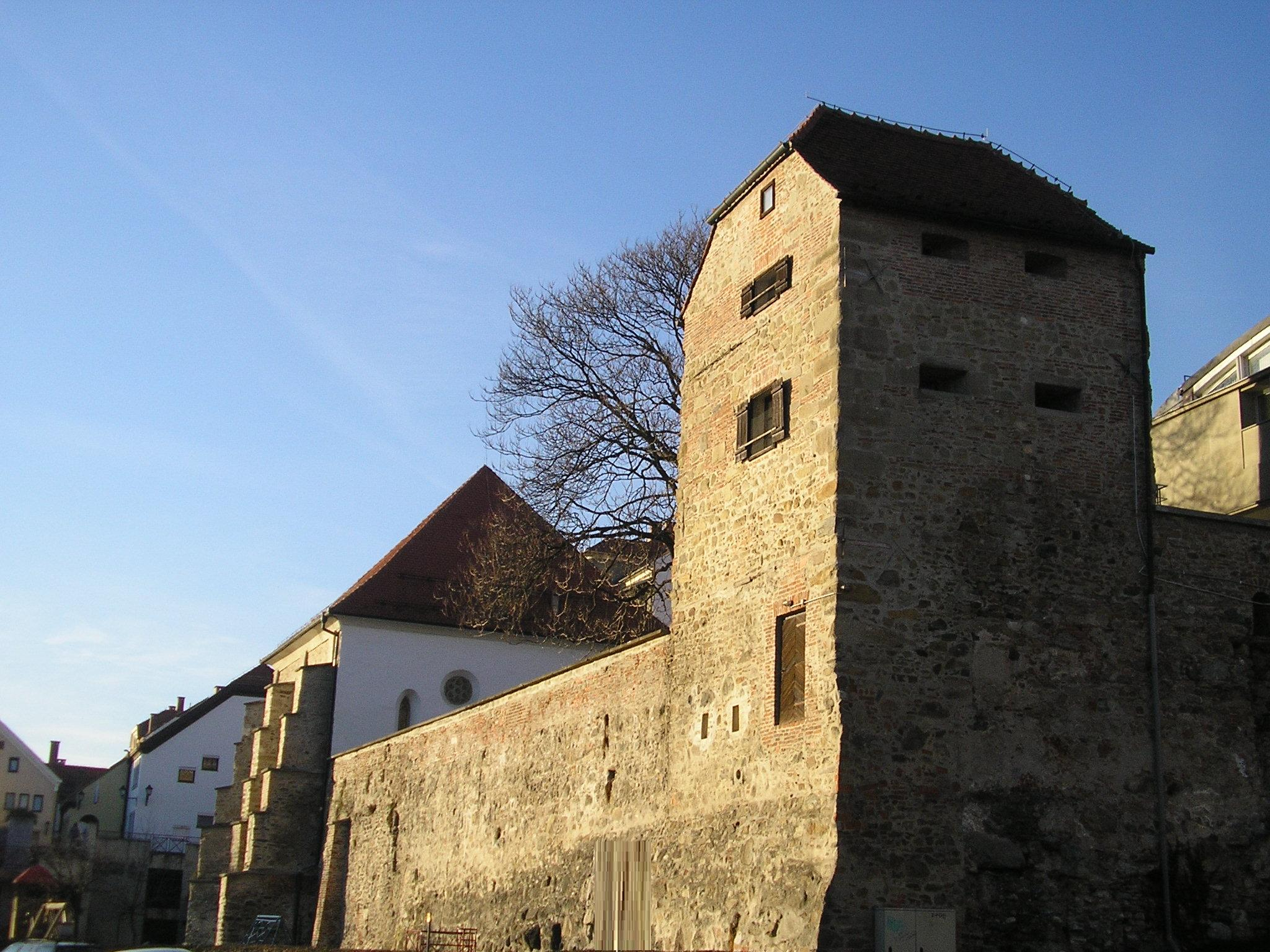
Jewish tower and Synagogue

Jewish people living in Maribor were first mentioned in 1277. It is suggested that at that time there was already a Jewish quarter in the city. The Jewish ghetto was located in the southeastern part of the city and it comprised, at its peak, several main streets in the city centre including part of the main city square. The ghetto had a synagogue, a Jewish cemetery and also a Talmud school. The Jewish community of Maribor was numerically at its apex around 1410. After 1450 the circumstances changed dramatically: increasing competition that coincided with an economic crisis dealt a severe blow to the economic activities that were crucial to their economic success. According to a decree issued by Emperor Maximilian I in 1496, Jews were forced to leave the city of Maribor. Restrictions on settlement and business for Jews remained in place until 1861. From late spring 1941, after Lower Styria was annexed by the Third Reich, the Jews of Maribor were deported to concentration camps.

== Culture ==
The more-than-400-year-old Žametovka grapevine growing outside the Old Vine House in Maribor.

The city is the location of the University of Maribor, established in 1975, Alma Mater Europaea, and several other higher education institutions. High schools include Maribor High School No. 1 (Prva gimnazija Maribor) and Maribor High School No. 2 (II. gimnazija Maribor).

Every June, the two-week Lent Festival (named after the waterfront district called Lent) is held, with hundreds of musical, theatrical and other events. Every year the festival attracts theatre, opera, ballet performers, classical, modern, and jazz musicians and dancers from all over the world.

Maribor is known for wine and culinary specialities of international and Slovene cuisine (mushroom soup with buckwheat mush, tripe, sour soup, sausages with Sauerkraut, cheese dumplings, apple strudel, special cheese cake called gibanica). The Vinag Wine Cellar (Vinagova vinska klet), with an area of 20,000 m^{2} (220,000 sq ft) and a length of 2 km (1 mi), has a capacity of 5.5 million litres (1.5 million US gallons) of wine. The house of the oldest grapevine in the world (Hiša stare trte) at Lent grows the world's oldest grapevine, which was in 2004 recorded in Guinness World Records. The grapevine of Žametovka is over 400 years old.

The most listened radio station transmitting from Maribor is the commercial radio station Radio City. Other radio stations broadcasting from Maribor include Radio NET FM, Radio Maribor, Rock Maribor, Radio Brezje, and Maribor Študent Radio (MARŠ).

The alternative scene of Maribor is situated in the Pekarna Cultural Centre, located in a former military bakery area in the Magdalena District.

== Sports ==
=== Team sports ===
Maribor is the hometown of the football club NK Maribor, playing in the Slovenian top division. NK Maribor has won the domestic title a record 16 times and has participated in the UEFA Champions League group stage on three occasions, in 1999, 2014, and 2017. The club's home ground is Ljudski vrt, located in the Koroška Vrata district.

Major sports clubs based in Maribor
Club	Sport	League(s)	Venue
NK Maribor	Football	Slovenian PrvaLiga	Ljudski vrt
KK Branik Maribor	Basketball	Slovenian Second League	Lukna Sports Hall
ŽKD Maribor	Basketball	Slovenian Women's Basketball League and WABA 2 League	Lukna Sports Hall
RK Maribor Branik	Handball	1. B SRL	Lukna Sports Hall
OK Maribor	Volleyball	Slovenian Volleyball League and MEVZA League	Tabor Hall
OK OTP Banka Branik	Volleyball	Slovenian Women's Volleyball League and MEVZA League	Tabor Hall
HDK Maribor	Ice hockey	Slovenian National Championship and Ö Eishockey Liga	Tabor Ice Hall
AVK Branik Maribor	Water polo	Slovenian National Championship	Kopališče Pristan

=== Winter sports ===
The Maribor Pohorje Ski Resort, situated on the outskirts of the city on the slopes of the Pohorje mountain range, hosted the women's slalom and giant slalom races for the Alpine Skiing World Cup. The competition, known as the Golden Fox (Slovene: Zlata lisica), was held for the first time in 1964, and was last held in Maribor in 2019. Since then, the event has been moved to Kranjska Gora due to a lack of snow in Maribor.

=== Event hosting ===
Ljudski vrt stadium, the home of NK Maribor

In November 2012, Maribor hosted the World Youth Chess Championship with Garry Kasparov as the guest of honour. It was presumed that Maribor would also host the 2013 Winter Universiade, but the Government of Slovenia refused any financial support for the project. As a result, in March 2012, the International University Sports Federation decided that it would organise the Universiade elsewhere. In the same year, Maribor also withdrew as one of the host cities of the EuroBasket 2013 due to lack of finances.

Maribor's Ljudski vrt stadium was one of the venues for the 2012 UEFA European Under-17 Championship and the 2021 UEFA European Under-21 Championship. In July 2023, Maribor hosted the 17th edition of the European Youth Olympic Festival.

=== Sports parks ===
Maribor's sports parks include the Pohorje Adrenaline Park (Adrenalinski park Pohorje), the Pohorje Bike Park, and the Betnava Adventure Park (Pustolovski park Betnava) with ropes courses, zip-lines, and poles.

== Transport ==
- List of bridges in Maribor
- Maribor railway station
  - Tauern Railway
- Maribor Edvard Rusjan Airport

== International relations ==
=== Twin towns and sister cities ===
Maribor is twinned with:

- Royal Borough of Greenwich, London, United Kingdom, since 1967
- Kraljevo, Serbia, since 1970
- Marburg, Germany, since 1979
- Udine, Italy, since 1985
- Szombathely, Hungary, since 1985
- Graz, Austria, since 1987
- Pétange, Luxembourg, since 1992
- Osijek, Croatia, since 1995
- Tours, France, since 1997
- Saint Petersburg, Russia, since 2001
- Pueblo, Colorado, United States, since 2006
- Kharkiv, Ukraine, since 2012
- Hangzhou, China, since 2017
- Chongqing, China, since 2017

=== Partner cities ===
Maribor has signed partnerships with:

- Kumanovo, North Macedonia, since 2014
- Ningbo, China, since 2014
- Nanjing, China, since 2015
- Nanchang, China, since 2015
- Novi Sad, Serbia, since 2015
- Huai'an, China, since 2015
- Makarska, Croatia, since 2015
- Yancheng, China, since 2015
- Wuxi, China, since 2015
- Vologda, Vologda Oblast, Russia, since 2016
- Bar, Montenegro, since 2016
- (Georgia (country)) Kutaisi, Georgia, since 2016
- Maladzyechna, Belarus, since 2016
- Wuhan, China, since 2016
- Mahallat, Iran, since 2016
- Sari, Iran, since 2016
- Veliko Tarnovo, Bulgaria, since 2016
- Smederevo, Serbia, since 2017
- Oryol, Oryol Oblast, Russia, since 2017
- Xi'an, China, since 2017
- Jinan, China, since 2018

== Gallery ==
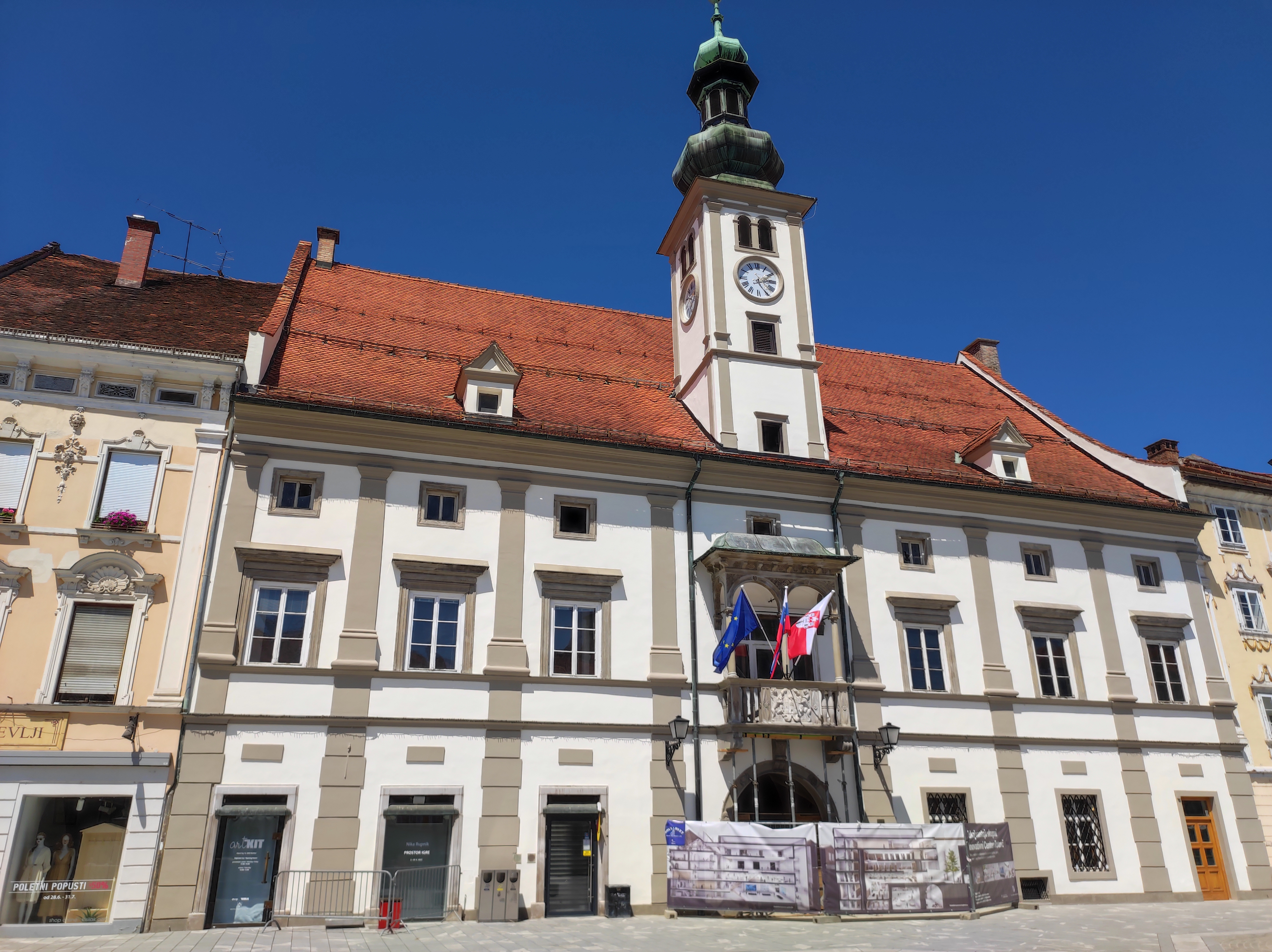
Town Hall

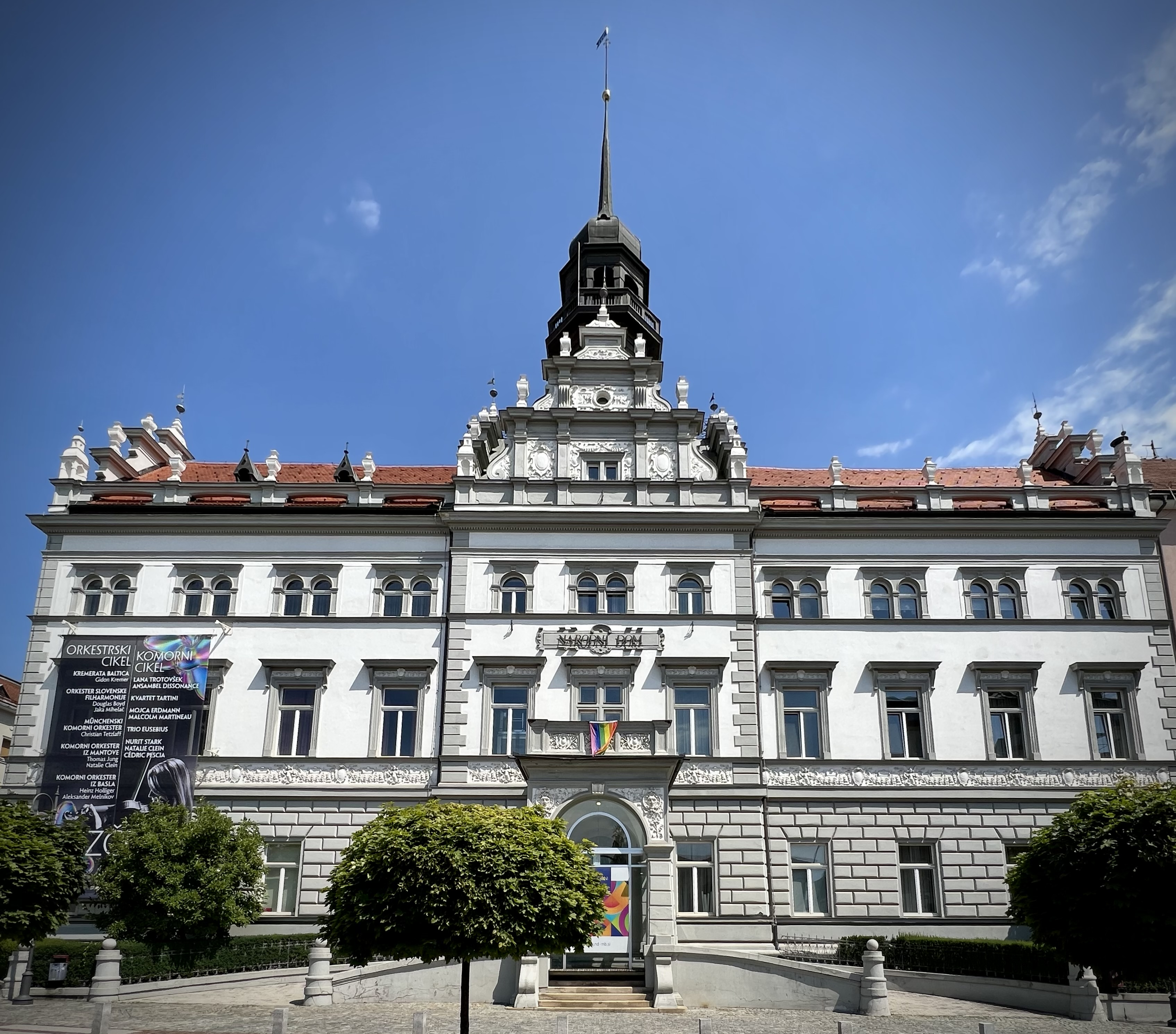
National Hall

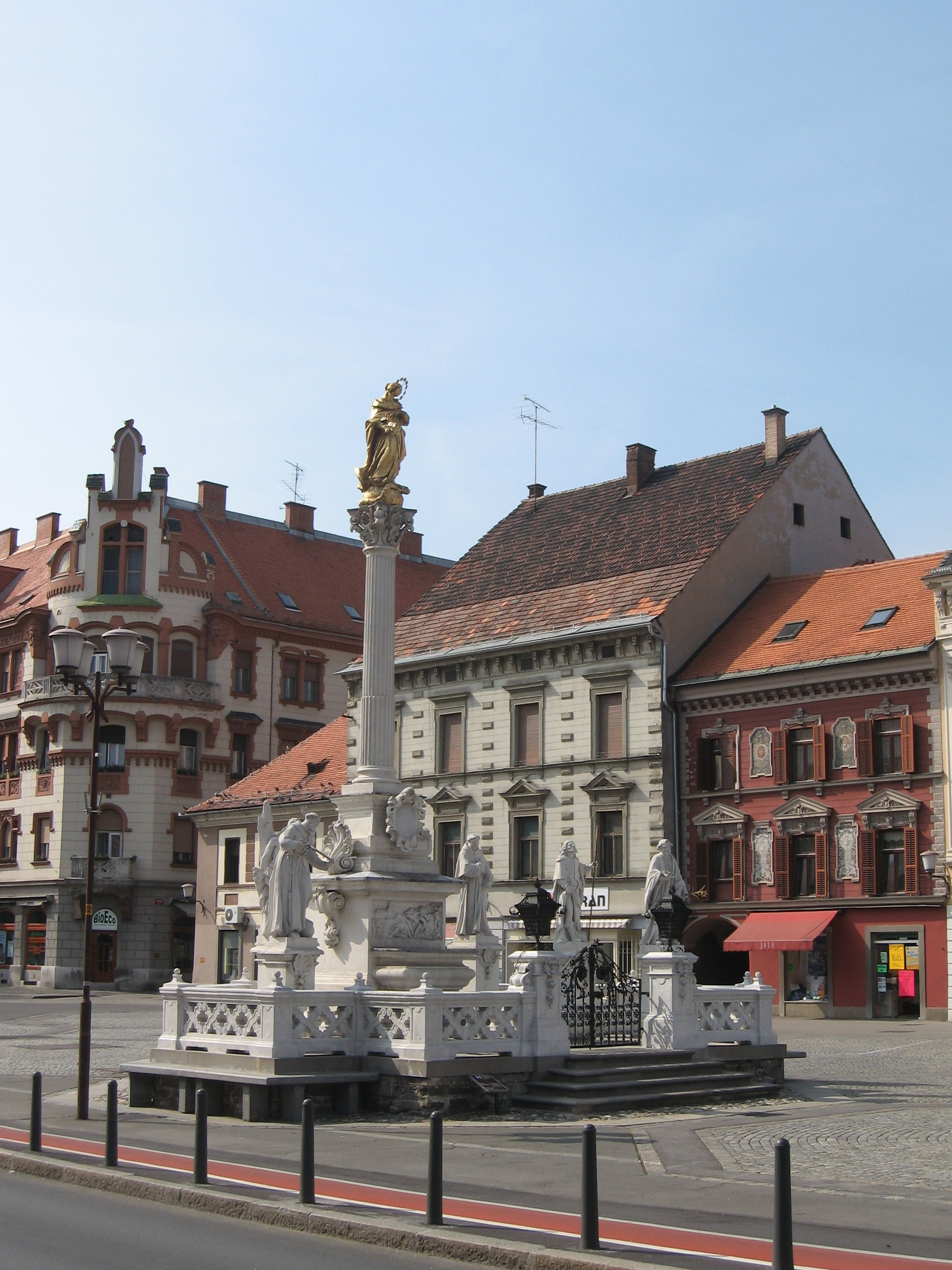
Plague Column

Old Bridge

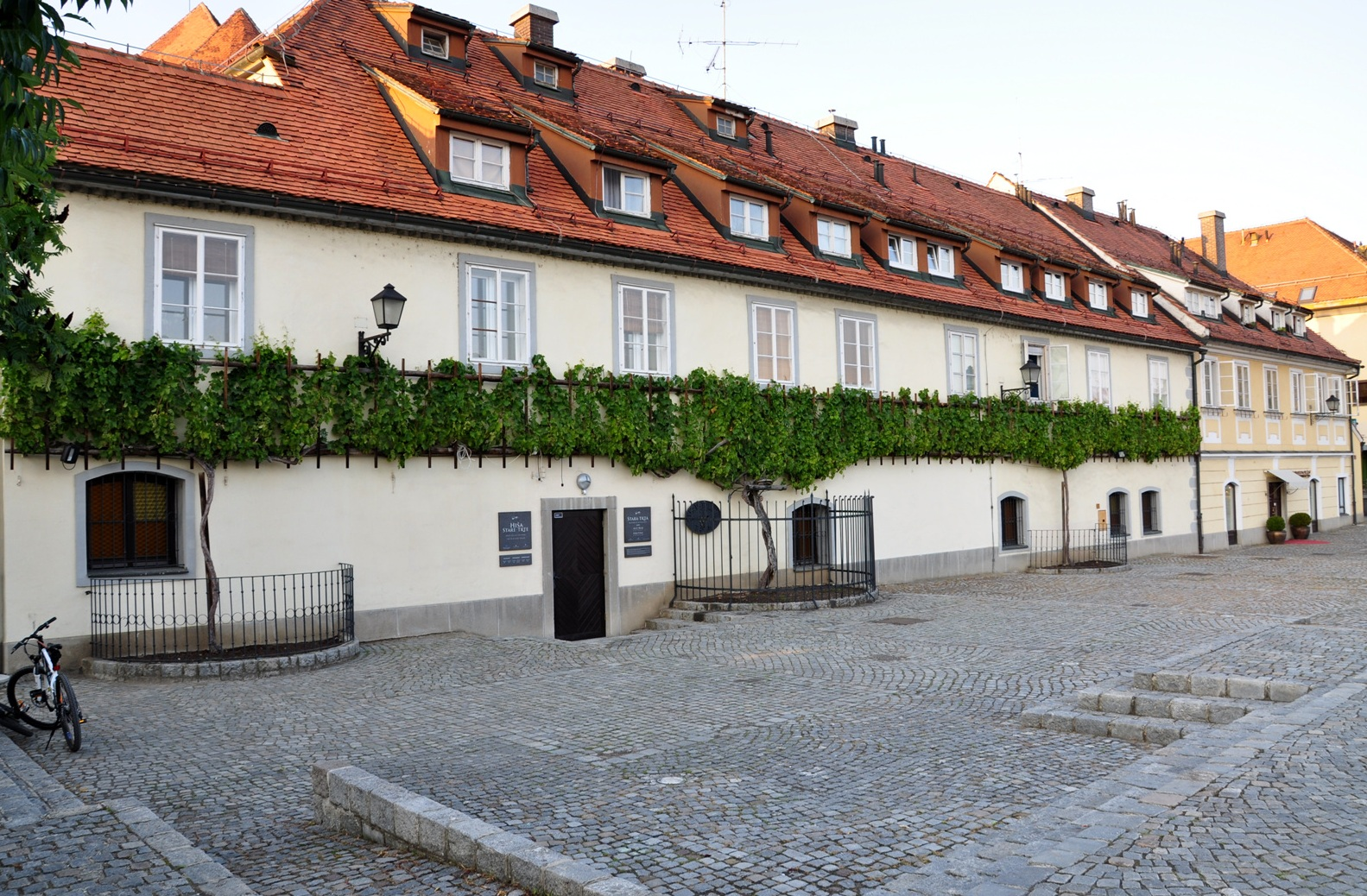
World's oldest vine

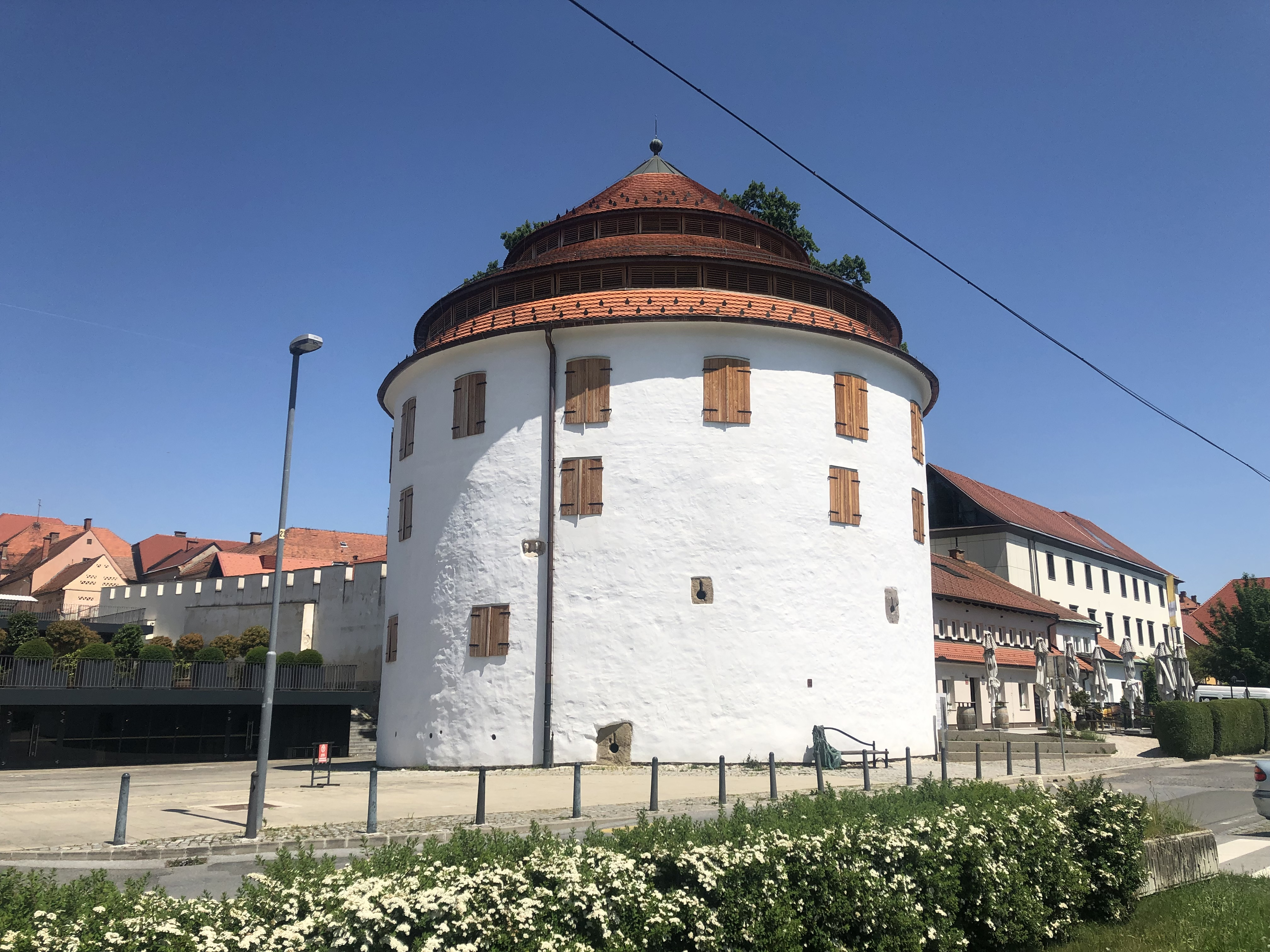
Judgement Tower

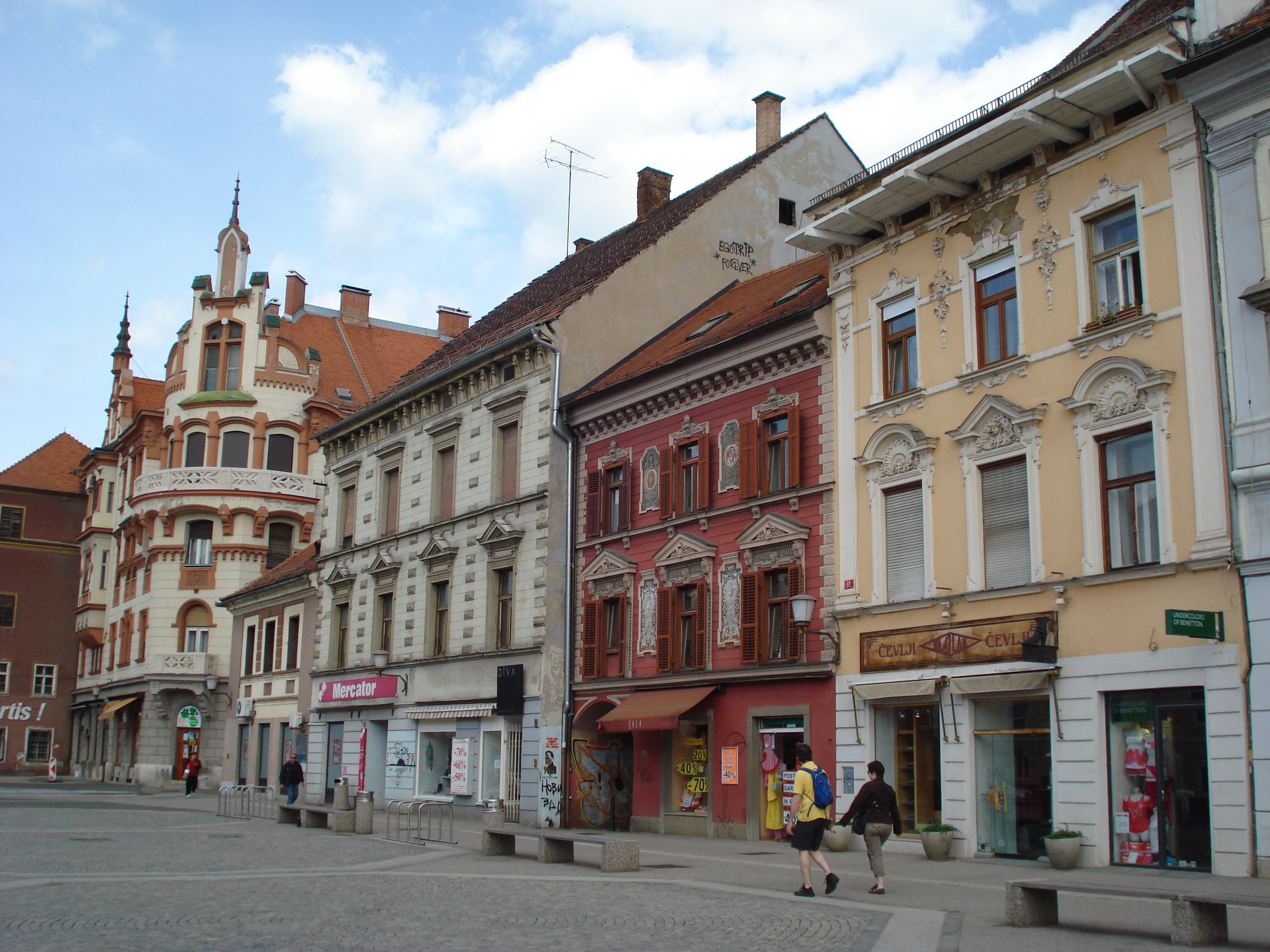
Main Square houses

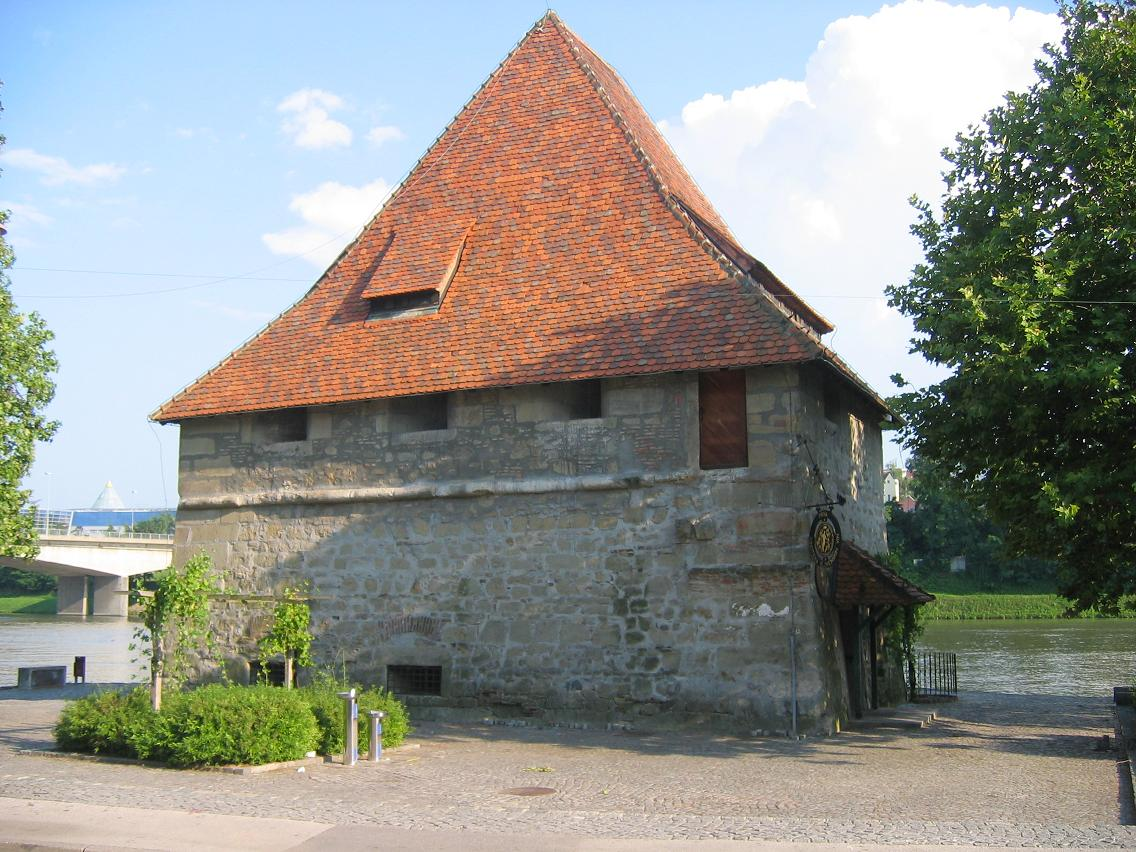
Maribor Water Tower

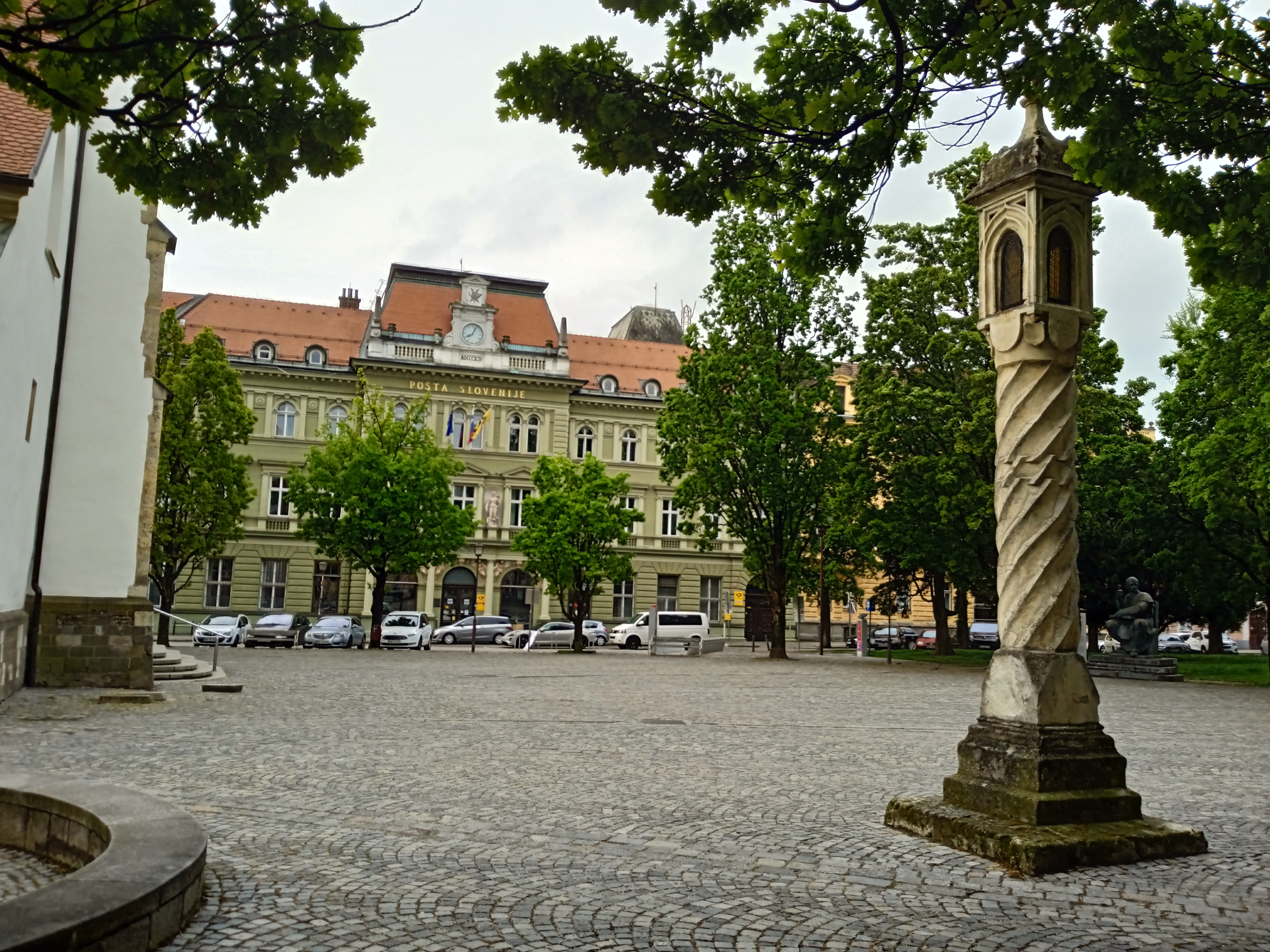
Post Office

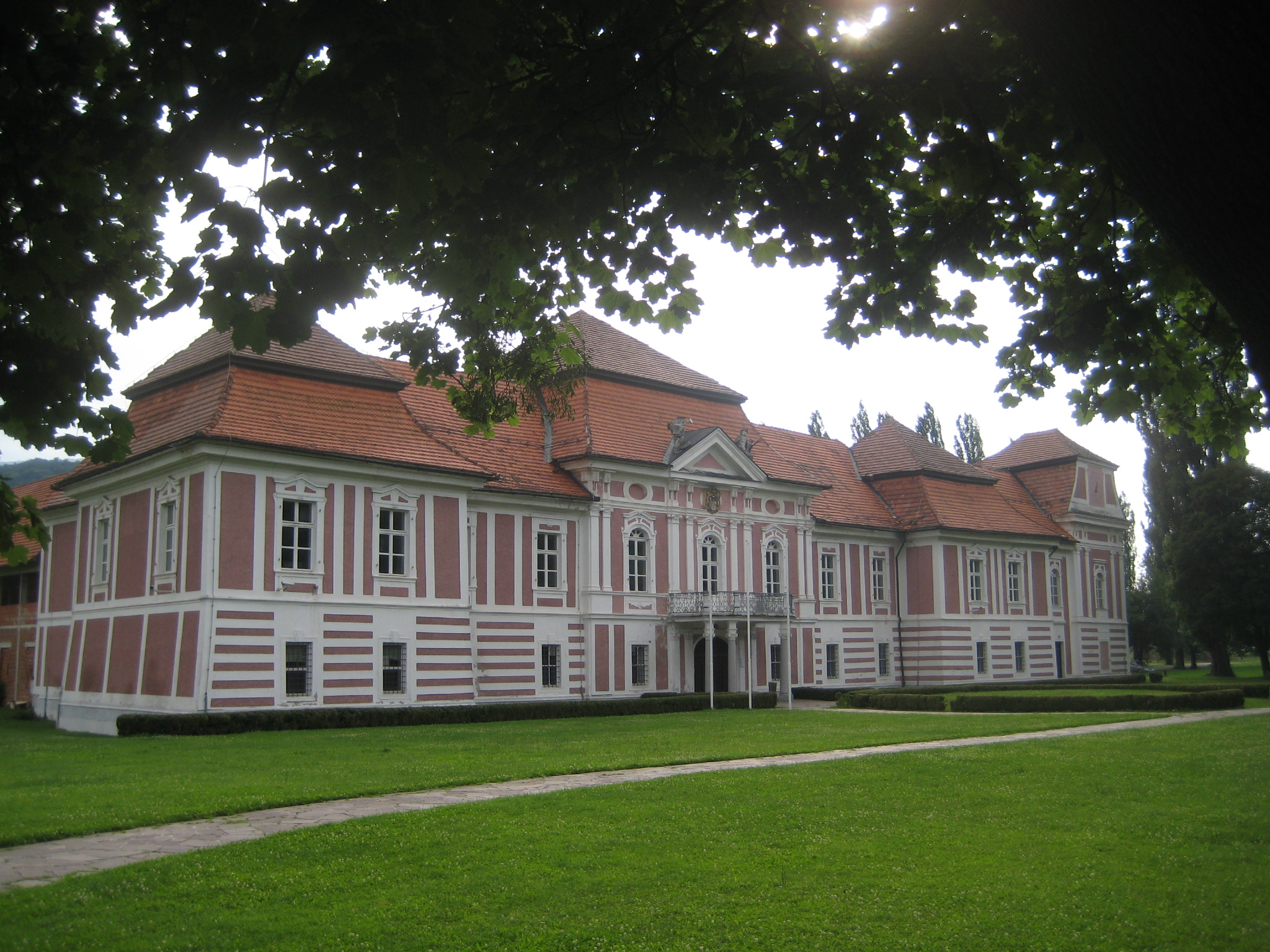
Betnava Mansion

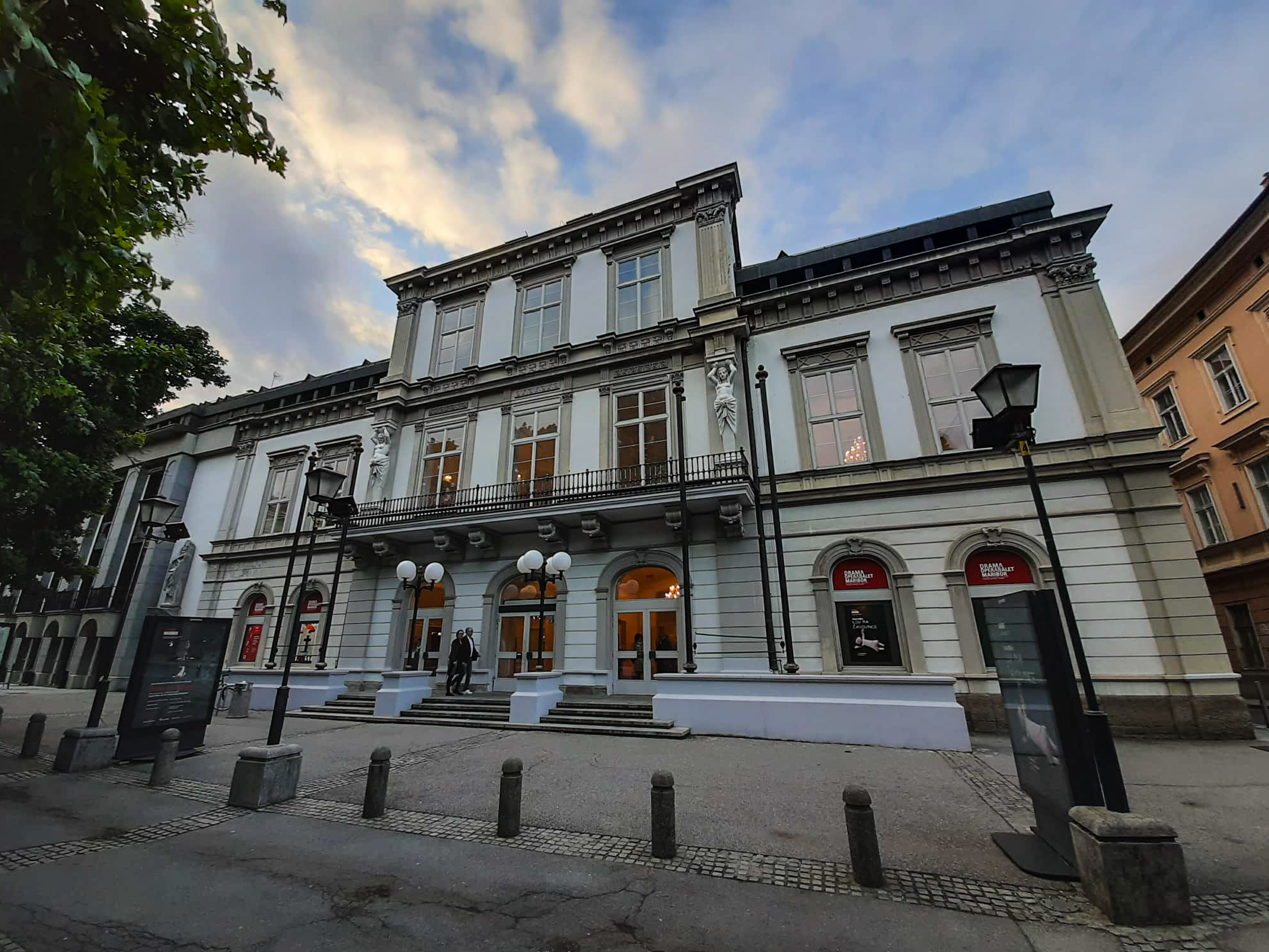
National Theatre

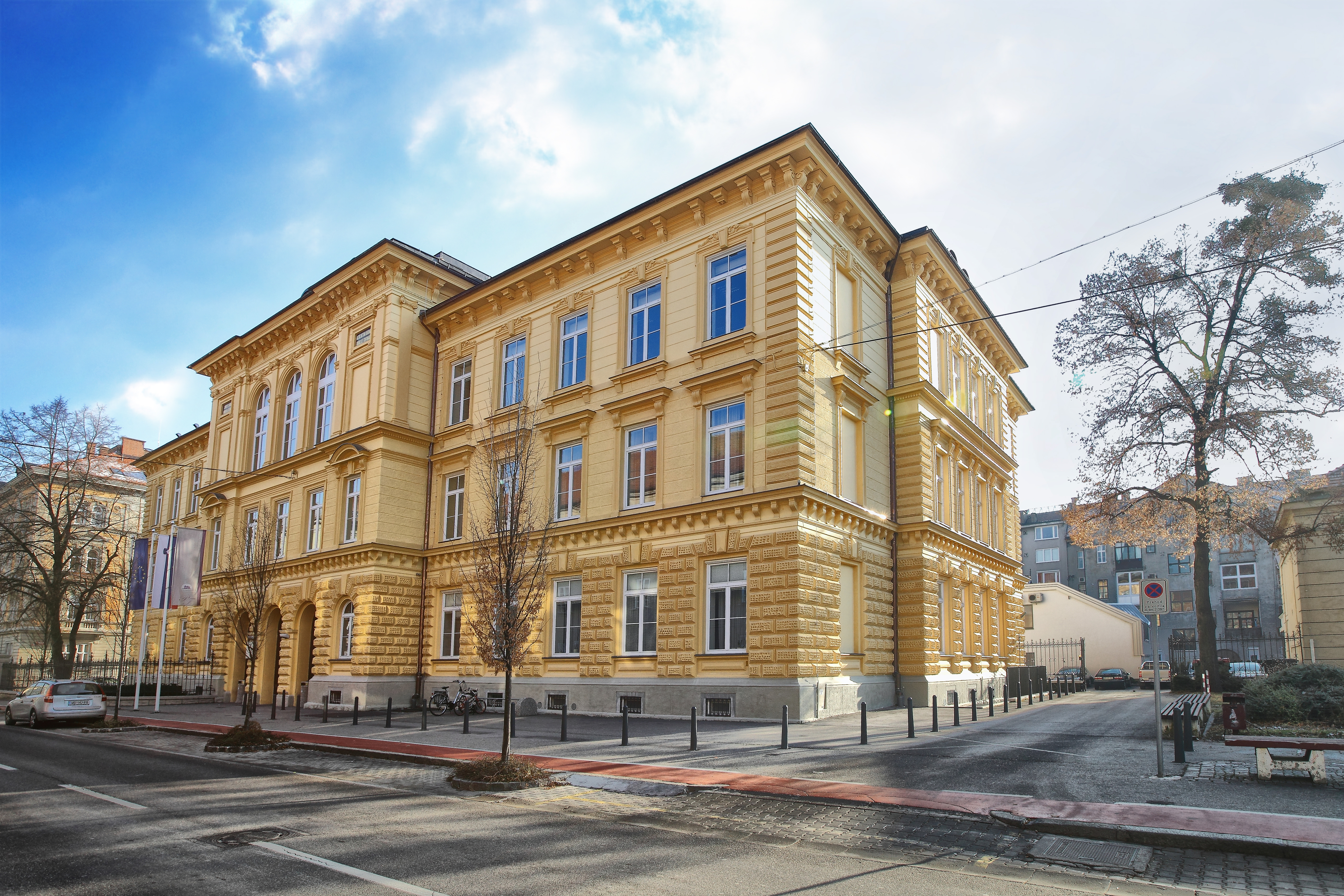
Faculty of Law

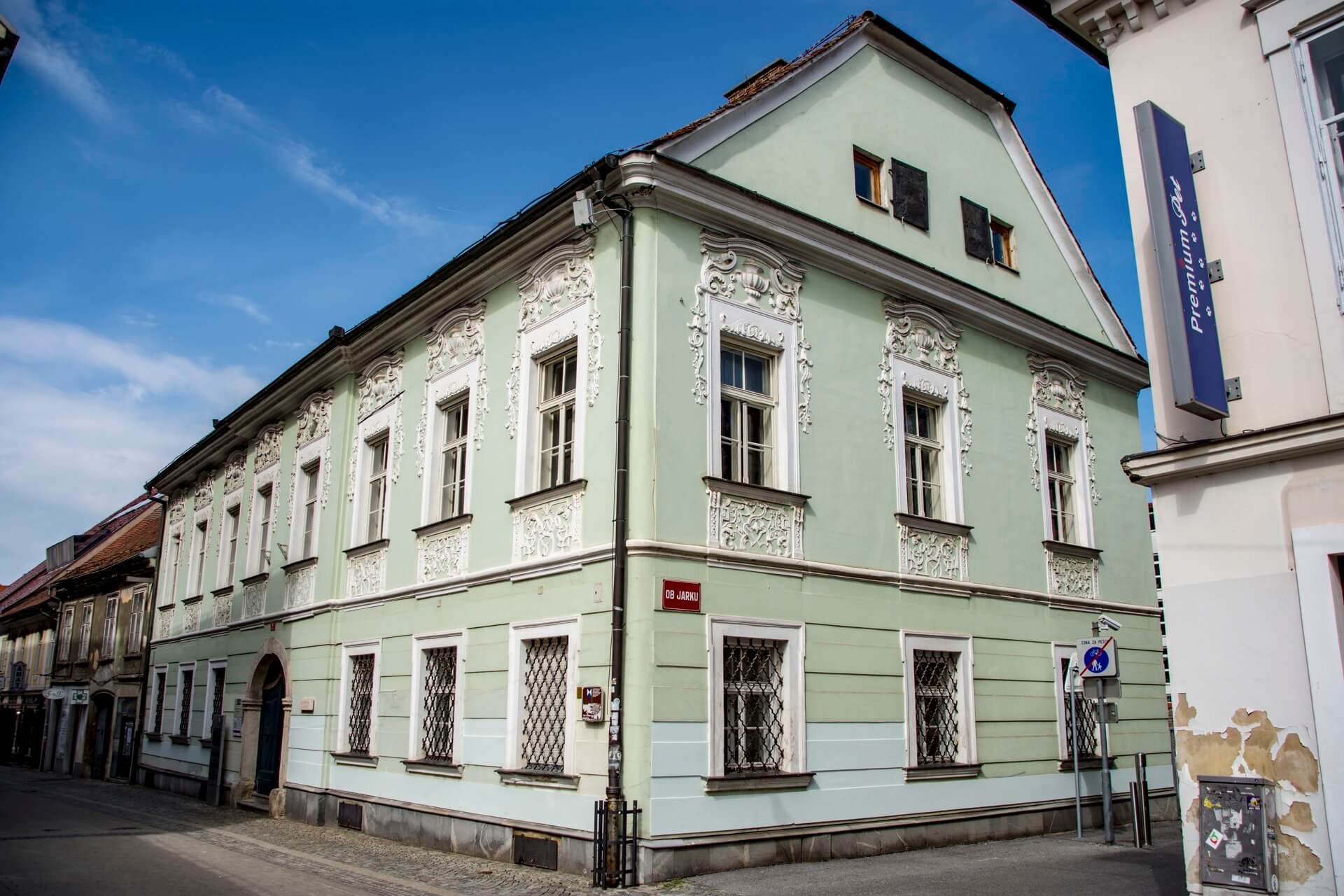
Salzburg Mansion

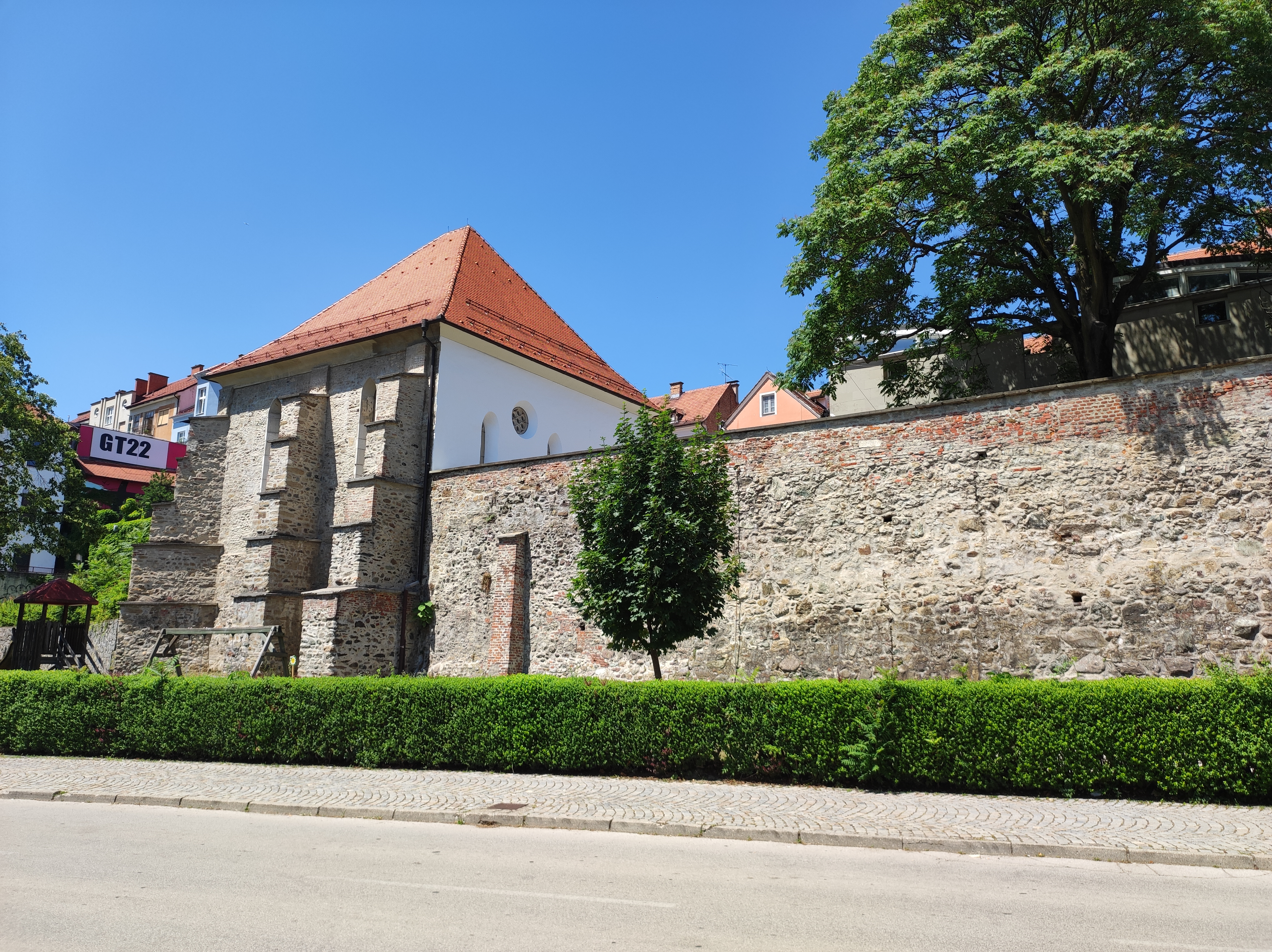
Maribor Synagogue

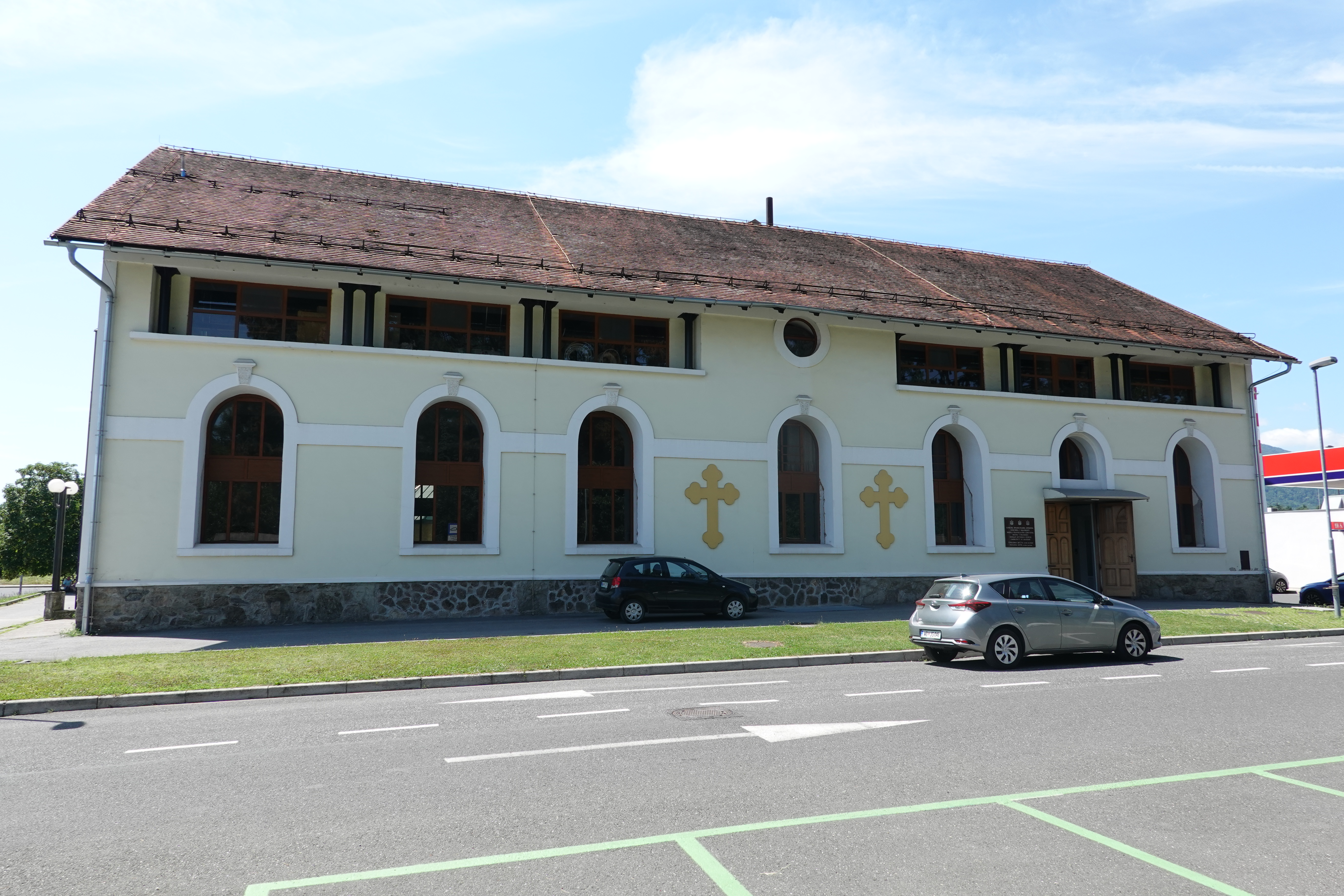
Orthodox Chapel

Railway station

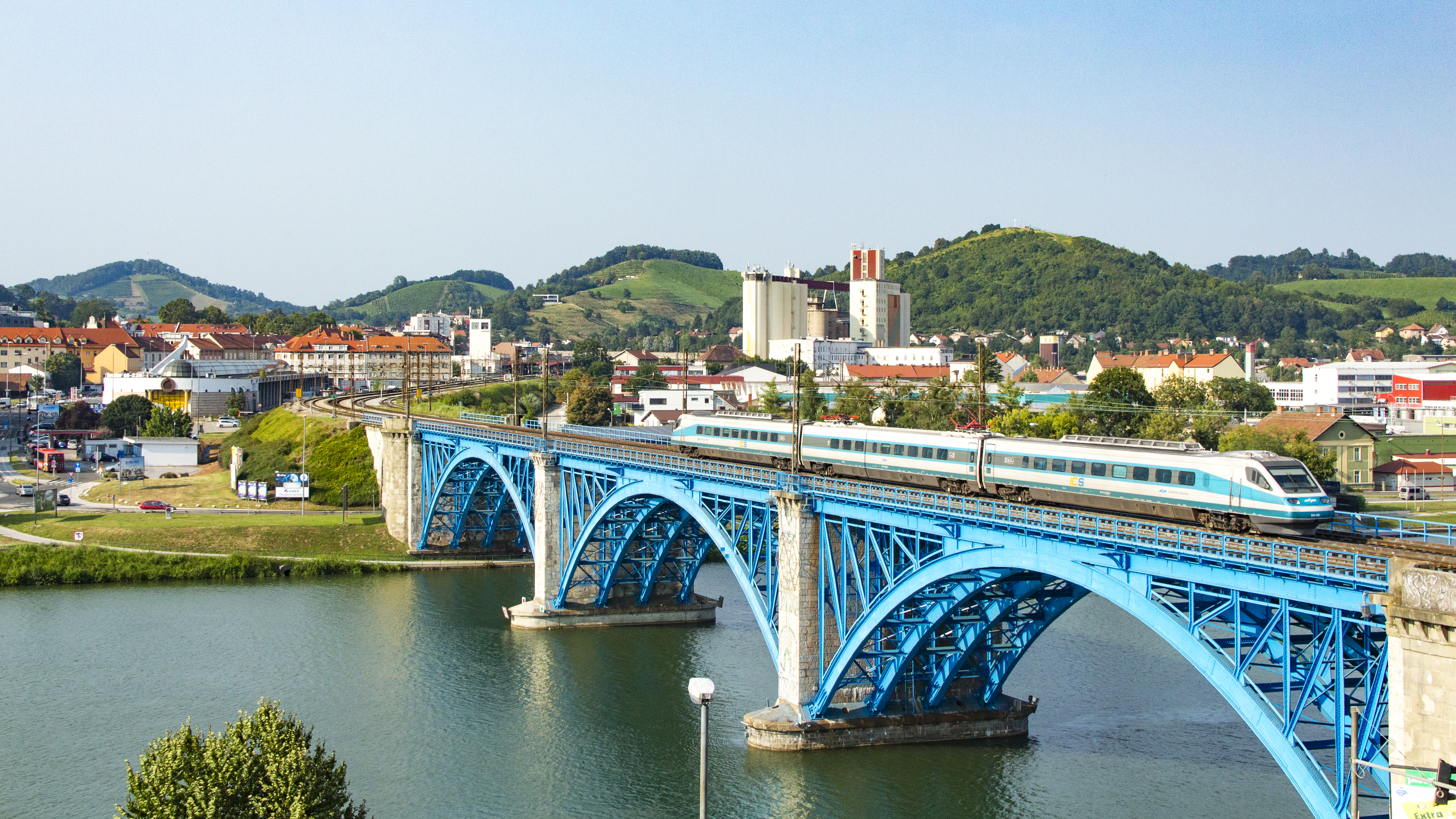
Railway Bridge

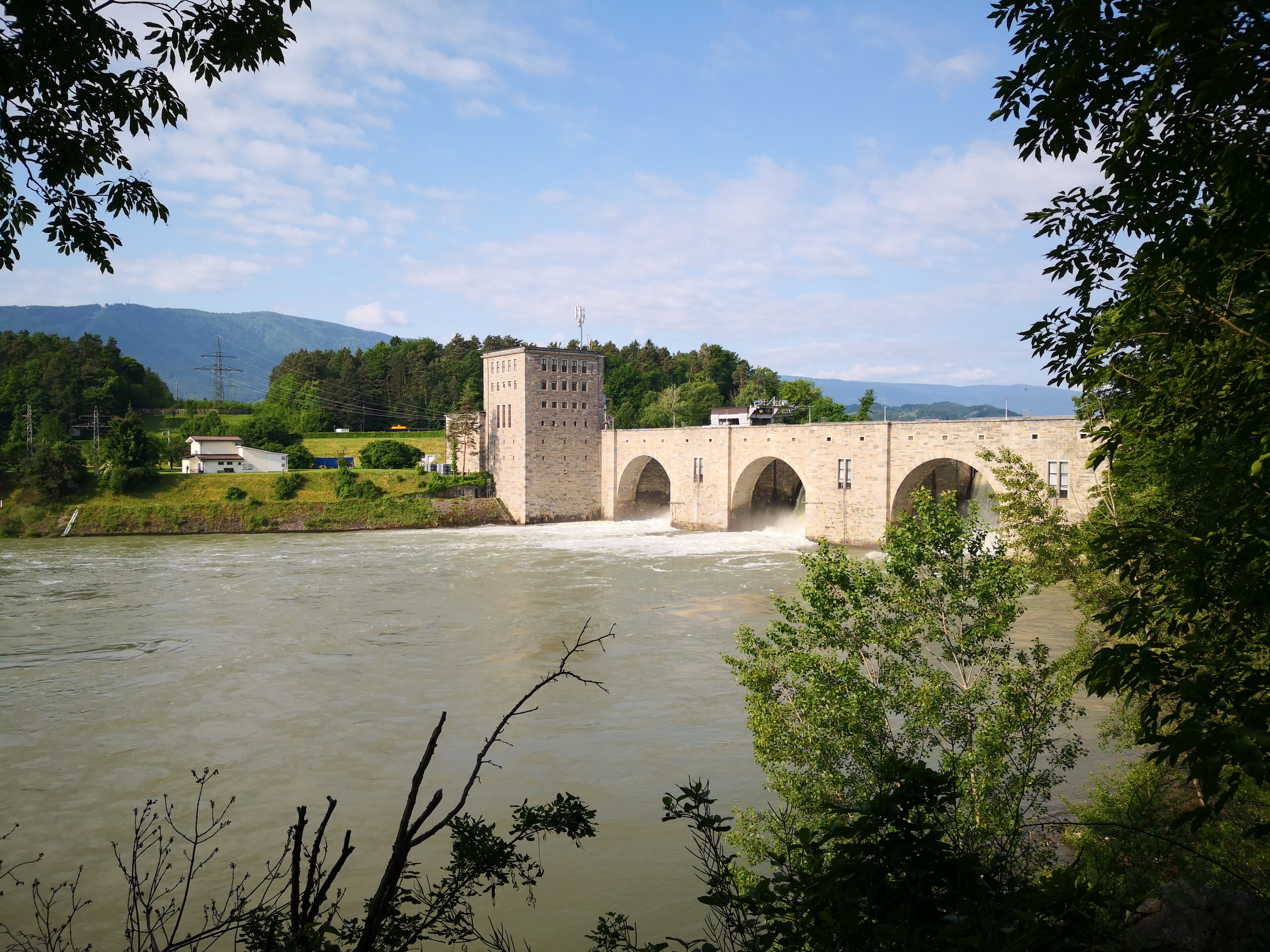
Hydroelectric Power Plant

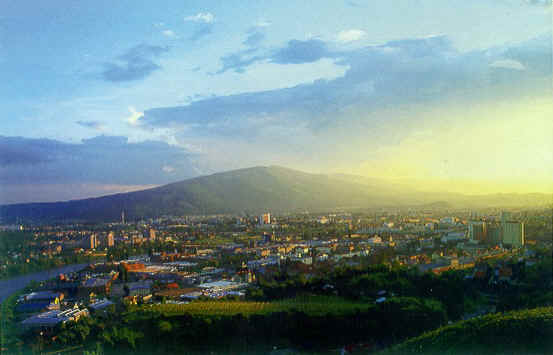
Pohorje

== See also ==
- List of people from Maribor
- St. Lazar's Church
