= Pyramid (Maribor) =

Hill above Maribor, Slovenia

Coordinates: 46.5682°N 15.6523°E

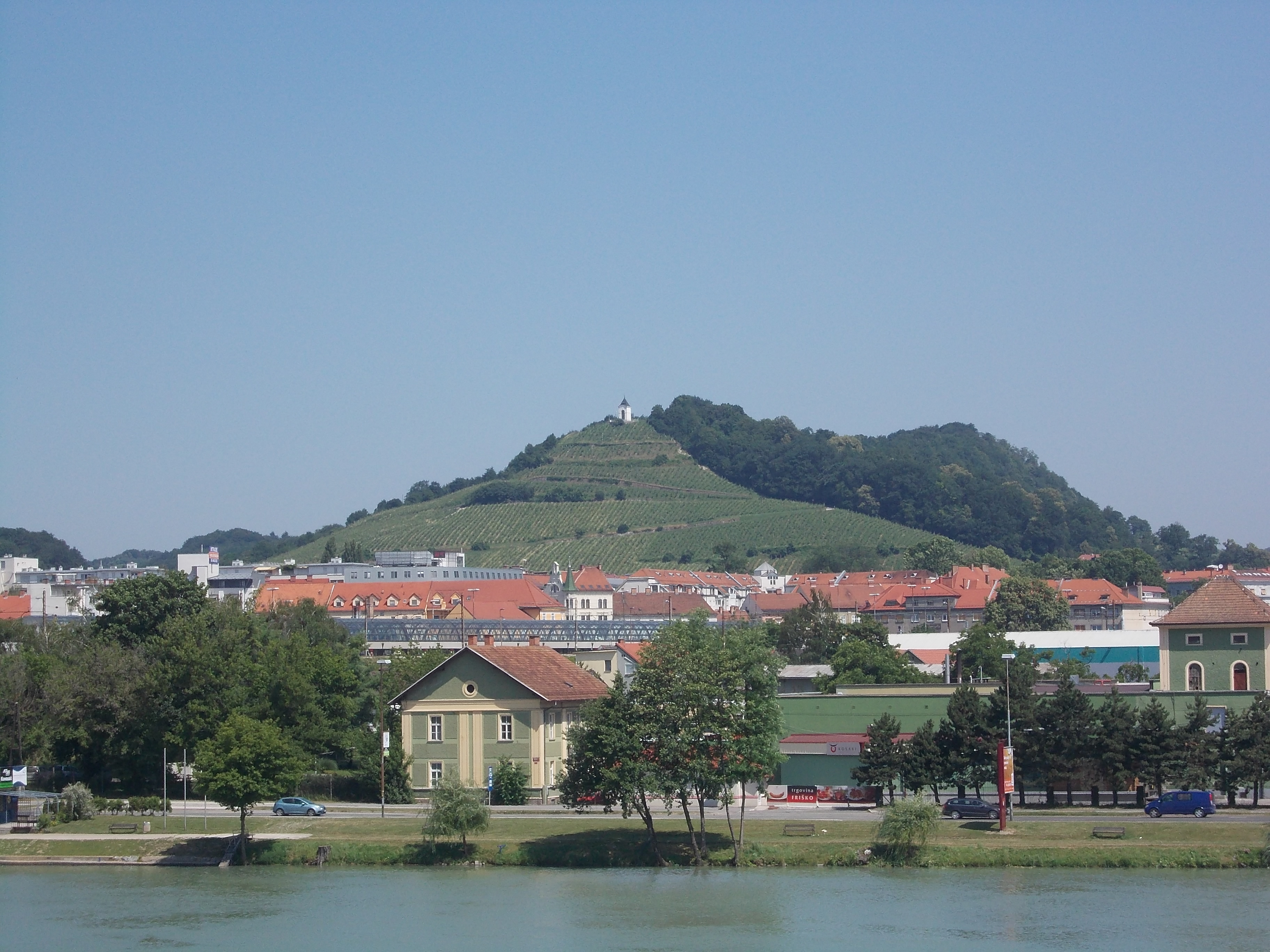
Pyramid

The Pyramid (Slovene: Piramida) is a low hill (elevation 386 m) in the city of Maribor, Slovenia. It is a popular excursion spot, affording a good view of the city. An ascent takes 15 to 30 minutes.

== History ==
Until 1784, the hill was the site of Upper Maribor Castle (Slovene: Mariborski grad, German: Schloss Obermarburg) The castle was demolished around 1790; in the following decade its debris was used to construct a stone pyramid-like obelisk, which gave the hill its current name. In 1821 the pyramid was replaced with a chapel containing a statue of the Virgin Mary. There is a vineyard on the slopes below the chapel.

Visible remains of the castle include defensive groundworks and an unimproved well.
