= Carinthian Bridge =

Carinthian Bridge Koroški most
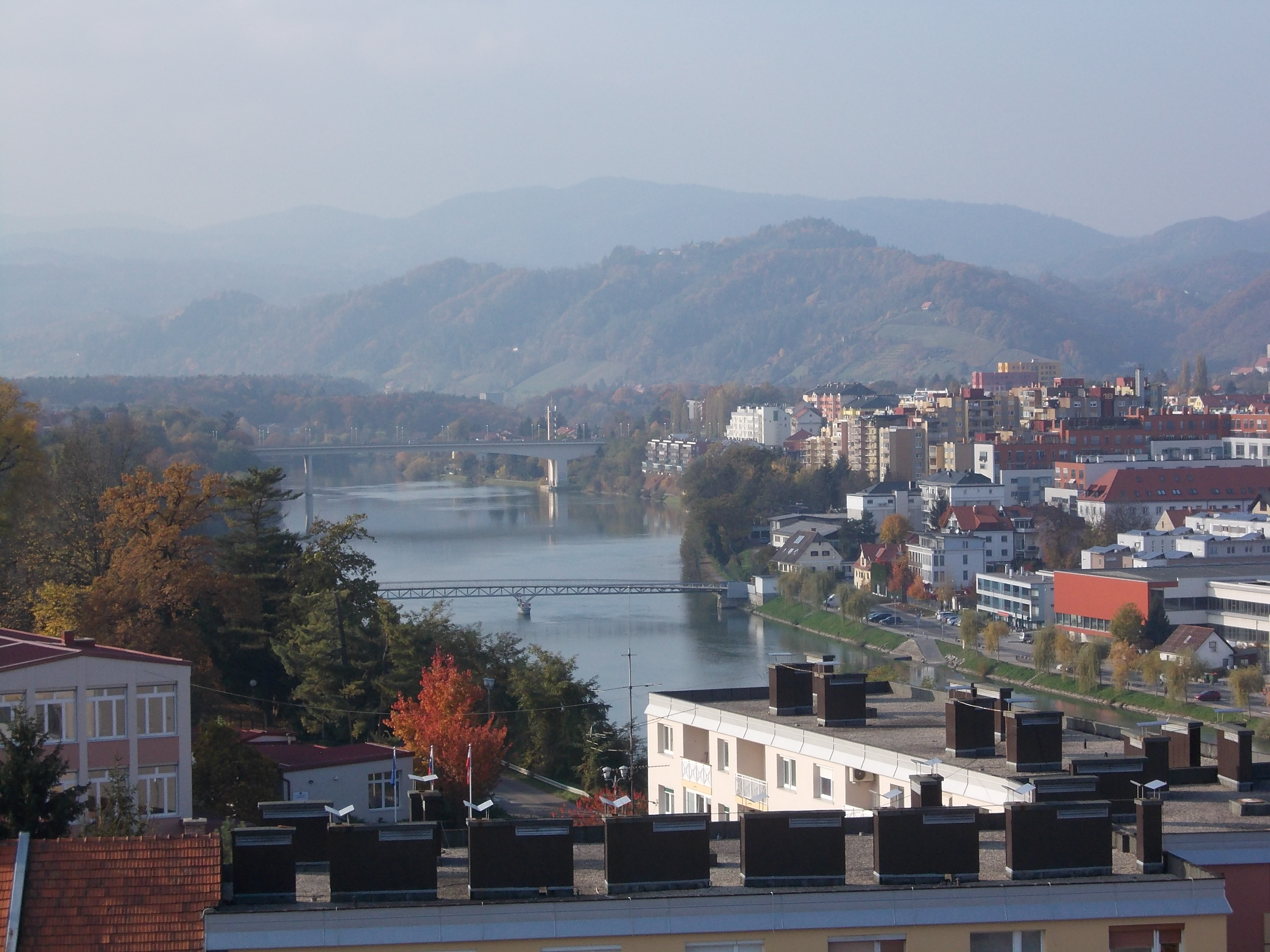
- Coordinates: 46°33′38″N 15°37′35″E
- Carries: cesta G1-1, odseka 0726/0326
- Crosses: Drava
- Locale: Maribor, Slovenia
- Official name: Koroški most
- Owner: Directorate for Infrastructure

Characteristics
- Design: Prestressed concrete frame construction
- Material: Concrete, steel
- Total length: 235 m
- Longest span: 110 m
- No. of spans: 3

History
- Designer: Marjan Pipenbaher, civil engineer
- Constructed by: Civil engineering
- Construction end: 1996
- Construction cost: Slovenski tolar 8.800.000
- Opened: October 19, 1996

Location
- Interactive map of Carinthian Bridge

Carinthian Bridge (Slovene: Koroški most) is a bridge crossing the river Drava in Maribor, Slovenia on the route of the main road G1-1, section 0726/0326.

The bridge was designed by the Maribor engineering firm Ponting, with Marjan Pipenbaher as the chief designer. The investors for the construction were the Republic of Slovenia and the urban municipality of Maribor, The contractor was Gradis - Engineering Company Ljubljana, p. o., which began construction in January 1994. At a ceremony on October 19, 1996, the bridge was opened to traffic by the then mayor of Maribor, Alojz Križman.
