= Jelenc =

Jelenc is a Slovenian surname. Notable people with the surname include:

- Andrej Jelenc (born 1963), Slovenian canoeist
- Maksi Jelenc (born 1951), Slovenian cross-country skier
