= Studenci Footbridge =

Footbridge over Drava river, Maribor, Slovenia

Studenci Footbridge Studenška brv
- Coordinates: 46°33′25.3″N 15°38′09″E
- Crosses: Drava
- Locale: Maribor, Slovenia
- Owner: City Municipality of Maribor

Characteristics
- Total length: 130 metres (430 ft)
- Width: 3.2 m – 5.8 m

History
- Architect: Bogdan Reichenberg; Gregor Reichenberg; Sašo Rek; Miha Milič
- Engineering design by: Viktor Markelj; Rok Mlakar
- Constructed by: Pomgrad d.d. Konstruktor NGR
- Built: 2006–2008
- Construction cost: €1.17 million
- Opened: 22 January 2008

The Studenci Footbridge (Slovene: Studenška brv) is a footbridge crossing the Drava river in Maribor, northeastern Slovenia. It is the smallest bridge on the Drava in Maribor, and connects Studenci on the right bank with Lent on the left bank.

== History ==
In 1885, the Municipality of Maribor built a footbridge over the Drava river. It connected the city with Studenci and was built mainly for the railway workers. On 13 September 1903, the bridge was swept away by floodwater, causing the deaths of two city guards. The following year, a new footbridge was built, which was destroyed in April 1941 by the Royal Yugoslav Army. The German Army rebuilt the bridge, but on 9 July 1946, it was again destroyed by floods. Two years later, the superstructure was replaced by a new one with two welded plate girders, and opened on 25 September 1948. The road on the bridge was also asphalted.

In 2004, the City of Maribor proposed the reconstruction of the bridge. Construction work began in November 2006 and was completed by January 2008. In July 2008, the bridge received the 2008 Footbridge Award.
