= Radvanje District =

Coordinates: 46°32′15″N 15°36′56″E

The Radvanje District (pronounced [ˈɾaːdʋanjɛ]; Slovene: Mestna četrt Radvanje) is a city district of the City Municipality of Maribor in northeastern Slovenia. The district has a population of about 8,000.

== Name ==
The name Radvanje was attested in historical sources as Radewan in 1096–1105, Radvan in 1220–1230, and Radoan in 1282, among other spellings. It is an elliptical derivation from *Ra̋dovan′e (selȍ) 'Radovanъ's (village)', referring to an early inhabitant of the place.
