= Koroška Vrata District =

Coordinates: 46°33′37″N 15°38′59″E

The Koroška Vrata District (pronounced [kɔˈɾóːʃka ˈʋɾàːta]; Slovene: Mestna četrt Koroška vrata; literally "Carinthian Gates") is a city district of the City Municipality of Maribor in northeastern Slovenia. In 2014, the district had a population of 7,283. The Koroška Vrata District is home to many secondary schools, high schools and faculties. Ljudski Vrt Stadium, the central stadium in Maribor, is located there.
