= Mitja Ferenc =

Slovenian historian, educator and author

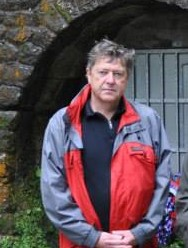
Ferenc in 2015

Mitja Ferenc (21 March 1960) is a Slovenian historian, educator, and author.

Ferenc was born in Ljubljana, the son of renowned historian and partisan Tone Ferenc. He graduated from modern history at the University of Ljubljana in 1985. Since 2000, he has researched the graves of people killed on Slovenian territory by the Yugoslav Communist regime after the end of World War II in the Bleiburg repatriations.

Between 2002–04, Ferenc was a member of the Commission on Concealed Mass Graves in Slovenia established by the Slovenian Government to document the 581 mass graves from Communist era found in Slovenia.

Ferenc contributed to the European Public Hearing on "Crimes Committed by Totalitarian Regimes" organised by Slovenian Presidency of the Council of the European Union (January–June 2008), and the European Commission. His work was featured in the chapter "Secret World War Two Mass Graves in Slovenia".

Ferenc teaches history at the University of Ljubljana. He has written several books on the history of the Gottschee German community.

== Major works ==
- Franja Partisan Hospital (Ljubljana: Ministry of Culture, Cultural Heritage Office of Slovenia, 2002).
- Gottschee: the lost cultural heritage of the Gottscheer Germans (Louisville, CO: Gottscheer Heritage and Genealogy Association, 2001).
- Nekdanji nemški jezikovni otok na Kočevskem - Former German Linguistic Island in the Kočevje Region (Kočevje: Pokrajinski muzej, 2007).
- Prikrito in očem zakrito: prikrita grobišča 60 let po koncu druge svetovne vojne ("Hidden to the Eyes: Hidden Graves 60 Years After the End of World War Two") (Celje: Muzej novejše zgodovine, 2005).
- Prikrivena grobišta Hrvata u Republici Sloveniji - Hidden Graves of Croats in the Republic of Slovenia (Zagreb: Počasni bleiburški vod, 2007).
