= Vjekoslav Servatzy =

Croatian fascist politician (1889–1945)

- Born: 23 March 1889; Ruma, Croatia-Slavonia, Austria-Hungary
- Died: 17 June 1945 (aged 56); Zagreb, FS Croatia, Yugoslavia
- Military career
- Allegiance: Austria-Hungary; Independent State of Croatia
- Branch: Austro-Hungarian Army; Ustaše
- Service years: 1914 – 1945
- Rank: General
- Commands: Janka Puszta camp Poglavnik's bodyguard division
- Conflicts: World War I World War II
- Awards: Golden Bravery Medal

Vjekoslav Servatzy (23 March 1889 – 17 June 1945) was a Croatian Ustaše military officer and nationalist politician, executed for war crimes in 1945.

== Biography ==
Servatzy was born in Ruma on 23 March 1889. As an officer in the Austro-Hungarian Army he was decorated with the Golden Bravery Medal (German: Goldene Tapferkeitsmedaille). After the establishment of the Kingdom of Serbs, Croats and Slovenes, he was often arrested as a Croatian nationalist. After the proclamation of the January 6th Dictatorship he left the Yugoslavia and in Italy he was one of the founders of the Ustaše, along with Ante Pavelić. In 1932 he was one of the organizers of Velebit Uprising. In 1933 he succeeded Jure Francetić as commander of the Ustaše's camp Janka Puszta in Hungary. He held this position until 1934.

In April 1941, he travelled to the newly created Axis puppet state, the Independent State of Croatia, together with Ante Pavelić, and became one of the founders and leaders of the Ustaša Militia with the rank of colonel in June 1941. In November 1944 he became a prefect of Gora-Prigorje County. In 1945 he was promoted to the rank of general. He was captured by the Partisans and executed on 17 June 1945 in Zagreb.
