= Jerca Vodušek Starič =

Slovene historian (born 1950)

Jerca Vodušek Starič (born 1950) is a Slovene historian. She received a bachelor's degree in history at the Faculty of Arts of the University of Ljubljana, a master's degree in 1979, and a PhD in 1991.

Her field of expertise is Slovene and European history. Her focus is the government takeover by the communists in Yugoslavia after World War II.

Currently she is a professor of modern history at the Faculty of Arts in Maribor.

From 2005 to 2008, she was the director of the Institute of Contemporary History in Ljubljana.

== Publications ==
- Jerca Vodušek Starič, Začetki samoupravljanja v Sloveniji : 1949-1953. Maribor, 1983; COBISS 12938241
- Jerca Vodušek Starič, Prevzem oblasti 1944-1946. Ljubljana, 1992; ISBN 86-361-0805-5
- Jerca Vodušek Starič, "Dosje" Mačkovšek. Ljubljana, 1994. ISBN 961-6143-00-X
- Jerca Vodušek Starič, Slovenski špijoni in SOE : 1938-1942. Ljubljana, 2002; ISBN 961-236-341-2
- Jerca Vodušek Starič, Kako su komunisti osvojili vlast: 1944.-1946. Zagreb, 2006; ISBN 953-6308-64-9
- Jerca Vodušek Starič, "The Making of the Communist Regime in Slovenia and Yugoslavia" in Crimes Committed by Totalitarian Regimes: Reports and Proceedings of the 8 April European Public Hearing on Crimes Committed by Totalitarian Regimes (ed: Peter Jambrek), pp 25–35. Ljubljana, 2008; ISBN 978-961-238-977-2
