= List of massacres in Slovenia =

The following is a list of massacres that have occurred in Slovenia or its territory (numbers may be approximate):

Name	Date	Location	Deaths	Notes
Marburg's Bloody Sunday	27 January 1919	Maribor	9 – 13 civilians of German ethnic origin	Possibly accidental or German provoked
Dražgoše massacre	11 January 1942	Dražgoše	41 Slovenian civilians	After the Battle of Dražgoše, German troops killed 41 villagers
Celje prison massacre	22 July 1942	Stari Pisker, Celje	100 Slovenian civilians	Mass execution of hostages carried out by German occupation forces
Maribor prison massacre	2 October 1942	Maribor	143 Slovenian civilians	
Turjak massacre	September 1943	Turjak Castle, Province of Ljubljana	115–1,000	115–1,000 POWs killed in aftermath by Partisans
Frankolovo crime	12 February 1945	Frankolovo	100 Slovenian civilians	Members of the Wehrmacht killed one hundred Slovene civilians
Tezno massacre	19–26 May 1945	Tezno, PR Slovenia	15,000	Mass killing of POWs and civilians of the Independent State of Croatia (NDH) by units of the Yugoslav Partisans
Marija Reka massacre	9 May - 6 August 1945	Marija Reka, Municipality of Prebold	3,000	Post-war massacres occurred in Marija Reka (near Prebold and Trbovelje). 3,000 people were killed without trial.
Pečovnik Mine massacre	May 1945	Pečovnik Mine, Zvodno	12,000 Croats civilians	Yugoslav Partisans killed 12,000 Croats by forcing them into the mine and covering them with concrete
Teharje camp	May 1945 - October 1946	Teharje	5,000	It is estimated that the postwar authorities executed approximately 5,000 internees of Teharje without trial during the first month or two after the Second World War
Sterntal camp	May - October 1945	Kidričevo	5,000	
Barbara Pit massacre	25 May – 6 June 1945	Huda Jama, PR Slovenia	1,416	Mass killing of prisoners of war of Ante Pavelić's NDH Armed Forces and the Slovene Home Guard, as well as civilians, after the end of World War II in Yugoslavia in an abandoned coal mine near Huda Jama, by the Yugoslav Partisans
Lokavec massacre	20 June 1945	Lokavec, Ajdovščina	5 - 7 Slovenian civilians	Murders of five to seven Slovenian civilians

== See also ==
- List of massacres in Yugoslavia
