= Pečovnik Mine =

Defunct coal mine and mass grave near Pečovnik, Slovenia

The Pečovnik Mine is a defunct coal mine in Zvodno, Slovenia. It is alleged that the site was used as a mass grave and crime scene where the Yugoslav Partisans killed 12,000 Croats by forcing them into the mine and covering them with concrete in 1945.

During World War II, the mine worked under the direction of the Germans. After the defeat of the Third Reich in 1945, the Yugoslav Partisans captured the mine. Shortly afterward, Josip Broz Tito ordered the Yugoslav Army to close it, although the local community argued that the mine still had plenty of coal and was not ready to be closed. Before the mine was closed with concrete on 8–9 May 1945, the Partisans forced 12,000 Croats to enter it, including 2,000 women and children. The next day, the Partisans closed the mine, leaving them underground to die from choking, dehydration, or hunger.

Some local Slovenes were arrested and prosecuted for reportedly giving testimony about the Pečovnik Mine and Matjaž Cave Mass Grave to international journalists.

Roman Leljak, with a group of archeologists and historians, made the first investigations and archaeological excavations of victims in the early 1990s. They were supported and financed by the Croatian government until 2000.

== See also ==
- Bleiburg repatriations
- List of massacres in Slovenia
- Tezno massacre
- Barbara Pit
- Huda Jama
- Persecution of Danube Swabians
