= Mostec =

- Location in Slovenia
- Coordinates: 45°53′56.12″N 15°37′43.08″E
- Country: Slovenia
- Traditional region: Styria
- Statistical region: Lower Sava
- Municipality: Brežice

Area
  - Total: 2.24 km^{2} (0.86 sq mi)
- Elevation: 143.2 m (470 ft)

Population (2020)
  - Total: 229
  - Density: 102/km^{2} (265/sq mi)

Mostec (pronounced [ˈmoːstəts], German: Brückel) is a village in the Municipality of Brežice in eastern Slovenia. The area is part of the traditional region of Styria. It is now included in the Lower Sava Statistical Region.

== Geography ==
Mostec lies the left bank of the Sava River and is connected to Čatež ob Savi by a bridge across the river at the far west end of the village's territory. Fields lie east of the village, extending to Dobova. The Nakla fields lie to the north, the Goričke fields to the east, and the Ledinšce and Jevšine fields to the south along the Sava. Negot Creek, a tributary of the Sava, cuts through the Poljanšce fields to the east.

== History ==
During the Second World War, the German authorities deported the population of the village and resettled it with Gottschee Germans.

=== Mass graves ===
Mostec is the site of two mass graves from the Second World War. The graves contain the remains of Croatian prisoners of war, Home Guard soldiers transported from the Teharje camp, and Slovene and Croatian civilians. The Antitank Trench Mass Grave (Slovene: Grobišče v protitankovskem jarku) dates from May and June 1945 and is located southeast of Mostec. The Mostec II Sava River Mass Grave (Mostec II - grobišče ob Savi) lies southwest of the settlement. The victims at the site were transported by bus from the Teharje camp and the prison in Šentvid, and killings were carried out from May to October 1945 by KNOJ units of the Yugoslav Partisans. At least one busload of women was also transported to the site and killed because the Huda Jama Mass Grave was already full. Excavation of the mass graves was carried out in September 2020.

== Church ==
The local church in the settlement is dedicated to Saints Fabian and Sebastian and belongs to the Parish of Dobova. It is a late Baroque church built in 1767 in thanksgiving for the end of the plague.

== Notable people ==
Notable people that were born or lived in Mostec include:

- Jože Toporišič (1926–2014), linguist
