= Historical Archives of Ljubljana =

- Zgodovinski arhiv Ljubljana (Slovene)
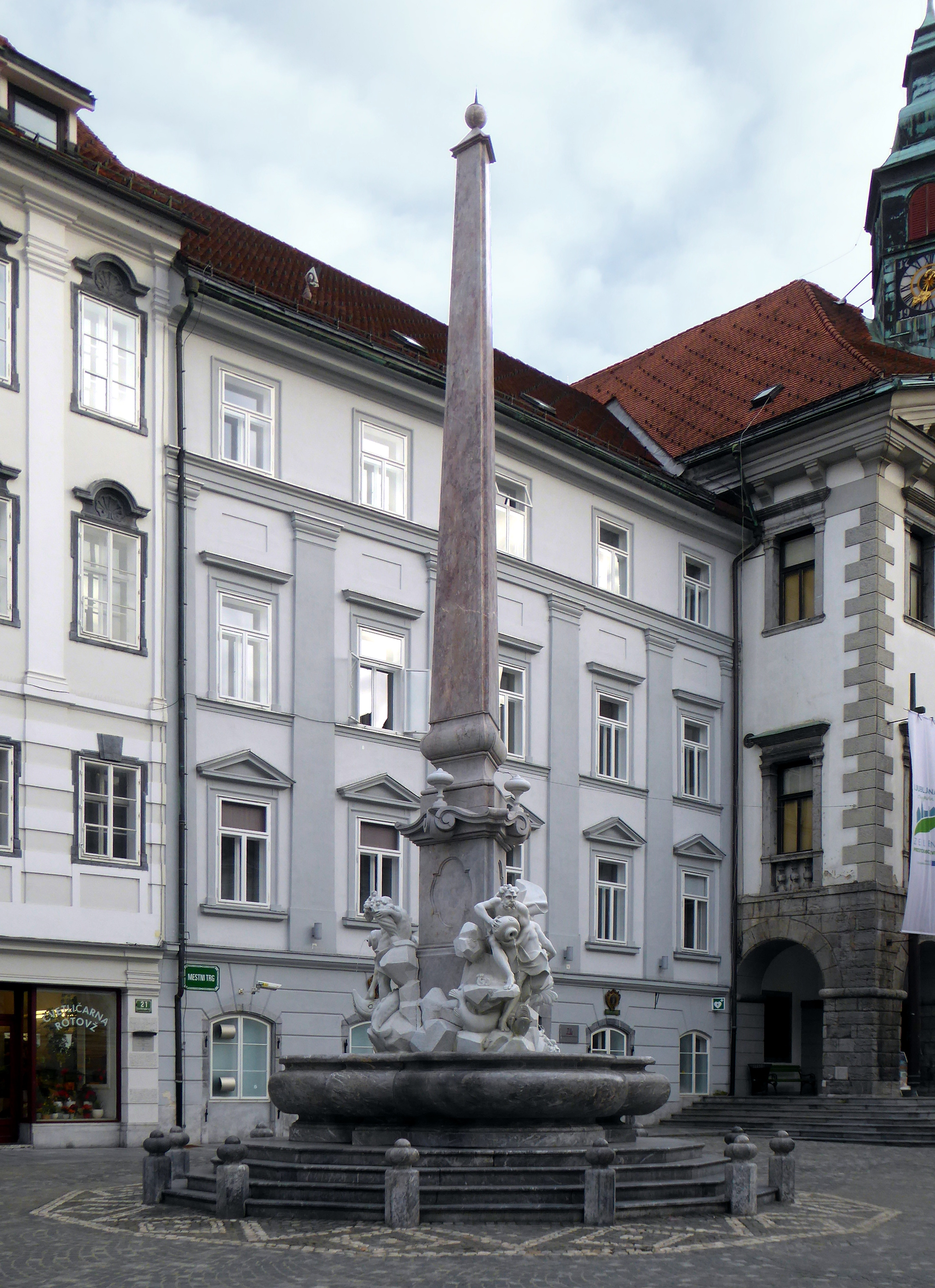

Agency overview
- Formed: 1898; 128 years ago Municipal Archive of Ljubljana; 1951; 75 years ago Historical Archives of Ljubljana
- Jurisdiction: Government of Slovenia
- Headquarters: Trdinova ulica 4, p. p. 1614, 1001 Ljubljana, Slovenia
- Parent agency: Archives of the Republic of Slovenia
- Website: Official website

The Historical Archives of Ljubljana (Slovene: Zgodovinski arhiv Ljubljana) is the primary institution responsible for preservation of archival materials in Ljubljana, capital city of Slovenia. The institution was established in 1898 as the Municipal Archive of Ljubljana with contemporary institution, itself established in 1951, serving as the direct successor of the Municipal Archives. Alongside headquarters in Ljubljana the institution oversees local organizational units in Kranj, Novo Mesto, Škofja Loka and Idrija. The archives holds around 16,000 linear meters of archival material. Most of the material pertains to the regions it serves and is generally over 30 years old, with the oldest items dating back to the 14th century. Since 2010 the archive is a part of the е-ARH.si of the Government of Slovenia project aimed at the development of the public electronic archive in Slovenia.

== See also ==
- List of archives in Slovenia
