= Marburg's Bloody Sunday =

1919 massacre in Maribor, Slovenia

- Part of the Austro-Slovene conflict in Carinthia
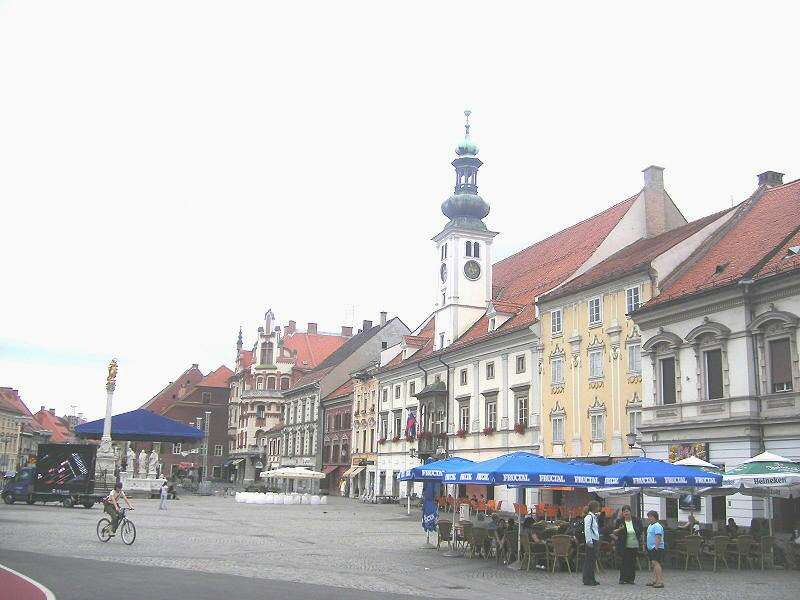
- Main Square in Maribor (Marburg) where Marburg's Bloody Sunday took place.
- Location: 46°33′28″N 15°38′44″E
- Date: 27 January 1919
- Target: Citizens of German ethnicity
- Attack type: Shooting
- Deaths: 9–13
- Injuries: 60+
- Perpetrator: Troops from the Kingdom of Serbs, Croats and Slovenes

Marburg's Bloody Sunday (German: Marburger Blutsonntag, Slovene: Mariborska krvava nedelja) was a shooting that took place on Monday, 27 January 1919 in the city of Maribor (German: Marburg an der Drau) in Slovenia. Soldiers from the army of the Kingdom of Serbs, Croats and Slovenes (later Yugoslavia), under the command of Slovene officer Rudolf Maister, killed between 9 and 13 civilians of German ethnic origin, wounding a further 60, after the soldiers were attacked during a protest in the city centre. Estimates of casualties differ between Slovene and Austrian sources.

In November 1918, after the First World War ended, the territories of southern Carinthia and southern Styria, which had been claimed by both the Republic of German Austria and the State of Slovenes, Croats and Serbs, were captured by military units under Maister's command.

Maribor was the largest city of southern Styria and had a predominately German-speaking population, while the surroundings were almost exclusively Slovene. A US delegation led by Sherman Miles visited Maribor on 27 January 1919 as part of a wider mission to resolve territorial disputes. On the same day, German citizens organised a protest proclaiming their desire for Maribor to be incorporated into the Republic of German Austria. When the German protesters attacked the Slovenian police commissioner Ivan Senekovič, Maister's soldiers fired shots into the air and later at the people, causing few casualties. In response, German Austria launched a military offensive which expelled the Yugoslavs from several small towns in Central Styria along the Mur River. A ceasefire was agreed under the mediation of France in February 1919. According to the Treaty of Saint-Germain-en-Laye, signed on 10 September 1919, Maribor and the rest of Lower Styria became part of the Kingdom of Serbs, Croats and Slovenes. No one was ever charged over the Maribor shooting.

== Background ==
The Republic of German Austria was created following the defeat of the Austro-Hungarian Empire in the First World War and claimed areas with a predominantly German-speaking population within the bounds of the former empire. In addition to the current area of the Republic of Austria, these included parts of South Tyrol and the town of Tarvisio, both now in Italy; southern Carinthia and southern Styria, now in Slovenia; and Sudetenland proper and German Bohemia (later also part of Sudetenland), now in the Czech Republic.

The victorious Allied Powers divided the territories of the former Austro-Hungarian empire between German Austria, Hungary and several other countries. Though the division of territories was conducted through a proclaimed principle of national self-determination, populations of ethnic Germans and Hungarians remained resident in many of these territories, including Czechoslovakia, Romania and the Kingdom of Yugoslavia.

Control of the city of Maribor was disputed by Yugoslavia and German Austria. A Federal Act of German Austria, concerning "the Extent, the Borders and the Relations of the State Territories of November 22, 1918", asserted a claim to the region of Lower Styria within which Maribor was located, but excluded from its claim the predominantly Slav-populated regions. To resolve the question of the ownership of Carinthia, the greater region of which Lower Styria formed a part, the U.S.-administered Coolidge Mission in Vienna proposed a demographic investigation of the territory. The mission was led by Archibald Cary Coolidge, professor of history at Harvard College, and operated under the American Commission to Negotiate Peace. The mission appointed a delegation to be led by Colonel Sherman Miles and including Lieutenant LeRoy King, professor of Slavic languages at the University of Missouri, and professors Robert Kerner and Lawrence Martin.

In 1900, the city itself had a population that was 82.3% Austrian German (19,298 people) and 17.3% Slovene (4,062 people; based on the language spoken at home); most of the city's capital and public life was in Austrian German hands. However, the county excluding the city had only 10,199 Austrian Germans and 78,888 Slovene inhabitants, meaning the city was completely surrounded by majority-Slovene ethnic territory. Some former independent settlements that later became part of the city had more ethnic Slovenes than Austrian Germans (e.g., Krčevina, Radvanje, Tezno), whereas others had more Austrian Germans than ethnic Slovenes (e.g., Pobrežje and Studenci).

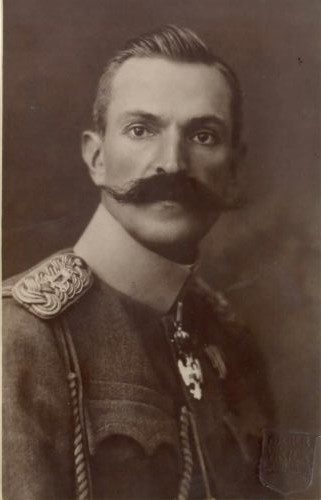
Military units which fired at citizens of Maribor were commanded by Rudolf Maister.

In November 1918, the Slovene major (later general) Rudolf Maister seized the city of Maribor and surrounding areas of Lower Styria in the name of the newly formed State of Slovenes, Croats and Serbs, a forerunner of Yugoslavia. On 23 November 1918, Maister and his soldiers disarmed and disbanded the "Green Guard" (German: Schutzwehr, Slovene: Zelena Garda) security force maintained by the Maribor city council. Maister captured several villages and towns north of the Mur River, including Lichendorf, Bad Radkersburg, Mureck and Marenberg. On 31 December 1918, Maister's units imprisoned 21 notable Maribor citizens of ethnic German origin.

== Shooting ==
Sources differ on the exact cause and extent of the shooting in Maribor. All agree that on 27 January 1919, the Coolidge Mission's delegation, led by Sherman Miles, visited Maribor and found thousands of citizens of German ethnic origin gathered in the main city square and waving flags of German Austria, many of which also decorated nearby buildings. German Austrian sources indicate that there were 10,000 protesters singing songs and wearing patriotic dress. Many of these protesters arrived to Maribor from Upper and Central Styria. Twenty soldiers under Maister's command were stationed in front of the city hall, armed with rifles mounted with bayonets.

German-language sources assert that the soldiers began firing into the crowd after they were taunted and after a protester attacked a Slovenian soldier. According to these sources the fatalities numbered 13, and a further 60 protesters were wounded.

A Slovene account of the same event asserts that the soldiers began to fire only when an Austrian citizen discharged a revolver in the direction of the Slovene soldiers, striking the bayonet of one. The soldiers then returned fire: according to this account 11 were killed, and an unknown number wounded.

== Aftermath ==
Subsequently, on 4 February 1919, German Austria commenced a military offensive to recover the regions of Central Styria controlled by Maister's troops. A ceasefire was agreed on 10 February 1919, under French mediation from their military mission located in Maribor. On 13 February 1919, a ceasefire agreement was signed and Maister's troops retreated from part of Central Styria.

The Treaty of Saint-Germain-en-Laye, signed on 10 September 1919 observed that Maribor was firmly under the control of the Yugoslav army and that, since Slovenes constituted a majority in the region surrounding the city, Maribor should remain, with the rest of Lower Styria, within the Kingdom of Serbs, Croats and Slovenes.

Responsibility for the shooting in Maribor was never conclusively established. Austrian sources attributed blame to Rudolf Maister, and referenced him in some accounts as the Butcher of Maribor. In Slovenia, by contrast, Maister remains well-regarded; numerous societies institutions and streets are named in his honour and he is commemorated in several monuments.

== See also ==
- Maribor prison massacres
- List of massacres in Slovenia
- List of massacres in Yugoslavia
