= Committee for the Marking and Maintenance of Graves from World War II and the Post-war =

Municipal committees in Bosnia and Herzegovina

The Committee for the Marking and Maintenance of Graves from World War II and the Post-war (Croatian: Povjerenstvo za obilježavanje i uređivanje grobišta iz Drugog svjetskog rata i poraća) are municipal committees in Bosnia and Herzegovina. As of September 2010, these committees are present in three municipalities. They are tasked with marking mass graves from World War II, maintaining the graves and exhuming them if possible.

Local municipalities in Bosnia and Herzegovina have thus far had to deal with graves from the Second World War on their own. Bosnia and Herzegovina is one of the few countries in the region not to have an agreement in place with Germany over the burial of German troops.

== Committees ==
- Busovača, Central Bosnia Canton
- Ljubuški, West Herzegovina County
- Neum, Herzegovina-Neretva County
- Široki Brijeg, West Herzegovina County

== See also ==
- Commission on Concealed Mass Graves in Serbia
- Commission on Concealed Mass Graves in Slovenia
