= Mass graves in Maribor =

Coordinates: 46°33′44.94″N 15°38′38.31″E

Mass graves in Maribor were created in Maribor, Slovenia, during and after the Second World War. The three known mass graves in Maribor itself and six additional mass graves in the immediate vicinity include some of the largest mass graves in Europe.

== Background ==
By the end of the war, Maribor was the most devastated major town in Yugoslavia.

The remaining German-speaking population, except those that had actively collaborated with the resistance during the war, was summarily expelled following the end of the war in 1945. At the same time, Croatian Home Guard members and their relatives trying to escape from Yugoslavia were massacred in the Yugoslav Partisan death march of Nazi collaborators and buried in mass graves.

== List of mass graves ==
Maribor is the site of several known mass graves associated with the Second World War:

- The Spodnje Radvanje Mass Grave (Slovene: Grobišče Spodnje Radvanje) lies south of the city, on the edge of a woods about 250 meters (820 ft) from the house at Spodnje Radvanje no. 31. It contains the remains of an unknown number of corpses. Its location was identified in 2002.
- The Pond Mass Grave (Slovene: Grobišče za ribnikom) lies southwest of the city, at the site of a pond and adjacent woods. It contains the remains of unknown victims and its location was identified in 2002.
- The Tezno mass graves (Slovene: Grobišče Tezenski gozd 1–6) lie southeast of the city, in a former antitank trench 3.5 kilometers (2.2 mi) long. During freeway construction in 1999, 70 meters (230 ft) of the trench was excavated, revealing the remains of 1,179 victims, mostly Croatian soldiers. Sounding confirmed burials in 981 meters (3,219 ft) of the trench, which is estimated to contain the remains of more than 15,000 victims. The first grave is in the Tezno forest in Maribor, and another five are in Dogoše.
