= Dogose =

Dogose may be,

- Dogoše district
- Dogosé language
