= Jože Toporišič =

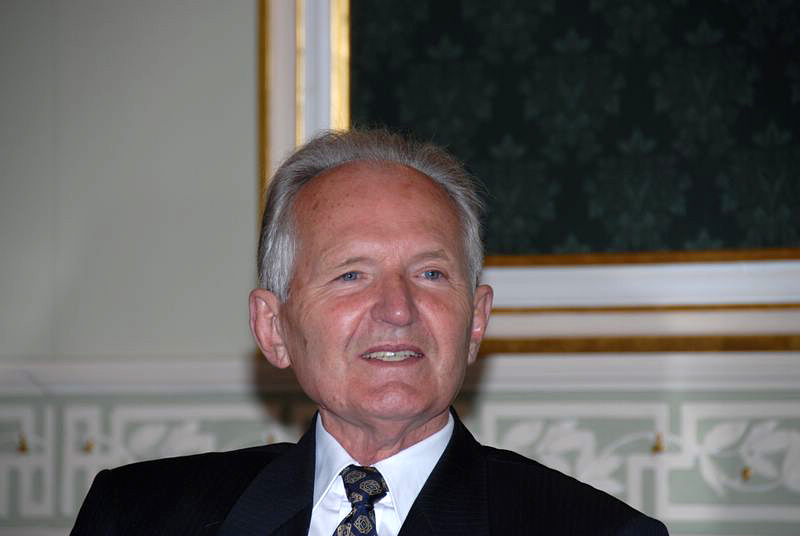
Jože Toporišič

Jože Toporišič (Slovene pronunciation: [ˈjóːʒɛ tɔpɔˈɾìːʃitʃ]; October 11, 1926 – December 9, 2014) was a Slovene linguist. He was the author of the most influential Slovene scientific grammar of the second half of the 20th century, a member of the Slovenian Academy of Sciences and Arts, and coauthor of the Academy's Slovene Normative Guide (Slovene: Slovenski pravopis). In this position, he transformed the linguistic section of the academy into the central regulatory authority for codification of Slovene.

== Biography ==
Toporišič was born in the village of Mostec near Brežice in Slovenia, in what was then the Kingdom of Serbs, Croats and Slovenes. During the Nazi occupation, his family was expelled from home and was resettled to Silesia, where they had to live between 1941 and 1945.

Upon returning to Yugoslavia, he studied Russian and Slavic philology in Ljubljana, and received his bachelor's degree in 1952. In the early 1950s, he became a junior lecturer at the University of Zagreb, where he was influenced by the Prague school of structural linguistics. After returning to Slovenia in the early 1960s, he received his doctorate in 1963 at the Faculty of Arts in Ljubljana with the dissertation Nazorska in oblikovna struktura Finžgarjeve proze (The Conceptual and Formal Structure of Finžgar's Prose). He started teaching at the University of Ljubljana and became the founding father of modern Slovene linguistics.

As a leading personality of the newer generation of linguists, who brought an innovative and structural approach to the teaching of language, he was trusted by the educational authorities of the Socialist Republic of Slovenia to supervise the reform of language teaching in Slovenian schools from the late 1960s on. He was the author or co-author of several important textbooks, as well as the author of the most influential reference grammar of Slovene. His work has had an enormous influence in the development of modern Slovene language teaching.

In 1968, he worked as an assistant researcher at the University of Chicago. Later he was a guest lecturer at the universities of Hamburg, Regensburg, Klagenfurt, and Graz.

In addition to Slovene, he was fluent in German, Russian, Serbo-Croatian, and English; he also read Polish and other Slavic languages.

== Views and opinions ==
Toporišič insisted on strong codification of language use (especially in pronunciation) as opposed to regional features. He frequently expressed his admiration for the language policy in France and suggested that a similar legal regulation of language use be introduced in Slovenia. He was also well known as the inventor of several neologisms in Slovene. Due to this, the general public often attributed to him the authorship of every neologism that entered Slovene through the media or the educational system, although this was not always the case.

Toporišič was often criticized for linguistic purism. He frequently voiced his disagreement with journalists, politicians, and other public figures that used words of foreign origin. In 2010, for example, he criticized Slovenian Prime Minister Borut Pahor for using too many English interjections.

Toporišič reiterated his conviction that a strong and centralized language policy is needed because of the extreme dialectal fragmentation of Slovene and the lack of a long and well-established tradition in the public use of Slovene.

== Legacy ==
In 2015, the primary school in Dobova, next to the village where Toporišič was born, was renamed Dr. Jože Toporišič Primary School (Osnovna šola dr. Jožeta Toporišiča).

== Selected published works ==
- Jože Toporišič, Enciklopedija slovenskega jezika (Ljubljana: Cankarjeva založba, 1992)
- Jože Toporišič, Slovenska slovnica (Maribor: Obzorja, 2002)
- Jože Toporišič et al., Slovenski pravopis (Ljubljana: Znanstvenoraziskovalni center SAZU, 2007)
