= List of archives in Slovenia =

This is a list of archives in Slovenia.

== Archives in Slovenia ==
- Archives of the Republic of Slovenia
- Historical Archives of Celje
- Historical Archives of Ljubljana
- Historical Archives of Ptuj
- Regional Archives of Kopar
- Regional Archives of Maribor
- Regional Archives of Nova Gorica
- Archive of the Liberation Front in Maribor

== See also ==
- List of archives
- List of libraries in Slovenia
- List of museums in Slovenia
- Culture of Slovenia
