= Commission on Concealed Mass Graves in Serbia =

Office of the Serbian Government

- Državna komisija za tajne grobnice ubijenih od septembra 1944

Agency overview
- Formed: 2009
- Minister responsible: Srđan Cvetković, Secretary
- Website: www.komisija.bgdream.com

The Commission on Concealed Mass Graves in Serbia (Serbian: Komisija za otkrivanje tajnih masovnih grobnica u Srbiji) is an office of the Serbian Government whose task is to find and document mass grave sites from the Second World War and the period immediately after it. It was established in 2009.

In 2010, the commission announced that its first investigations would be in Zaječar in eastern Serbia. On April 29, 2010 all documents relating to the commission's work were unsealed from secrecy.

After one year of operation, the commission announced that it had found 190 potential grave sites and had collected information on over 100,000 victims. The commission has prompted Serbian president Boris Tadić to call for a committee of Serbian and Hungarian academics to investigate war crimes committed by both sides in Vojvodina during the war.

== Members ==
- Slobodan Radovanović - Chairman of the Commission
- Slobodan Homen
- Ivan Bulatović
- Blagoje Peruničić

== Organization ==
A local branch of the commission has been established for the Zaječar District.

== Exhumations ==
- Boljevac - In 2010, the remains of at least 26 people were discovered in a mass grave.

== Findings ==
- By November, 2010: 190 potential grave sites and collected information on over 18,000 victims.
- By December, 2011: 206 potential graves sites and collected information on over 36,000 victims.

== See also ==
- Commission on Concealed Mass Graves in Slovenia
- Committee for the Marking and Maintenance of Graves from World War II and the Post-war
