= Tezno District =

Area of Maribor in north-eastern Slovenia

Coordinates: 46°32′18″N 15°39′18″E

The Tezno District (pronounced [ˈteːznɔ]; Slovene: Mestna četrt Tezno, German: Thesen) is a city district of the City Municipality of Maribor in northeastern Slovenia. In 2014, the district had a population of 11,732. After World War II, a large trench in Tezno became a major mass grave, which was later investigated by the Commission on Concealed Mass Graves in Slovenia.
