= Franc Suher =

Franc Suher (October 4, 1861 – February 11, 1944), also known as Franz Suher, was a Slovene schoolmaster and drawing methodologist.

== Life and education ==
Suher was born in Huda Jama, the son of the mining supervisor Jožef Suher and his wife Gertraud née Roboz. After graduating from the Maribor normal school in 1880, he taught in Braslovče and Slivnica pri Mariboru. He later studied in Graz, Vienna, Salzburg, Munich, and Jena before returning to Slovenia, where he taught drawing in Ljubljana until his retirement in 1925. Suher died in Ljubljana on February 11, 1944.

== Works ==
In addition to works on drawing, his publications included works on art and education, school reform, the influence of foreign artistic models. Suher also served as secretary of the Slovene Choral Society in Ptuj for several years.

=== Selected works ===
- Sanje (in Naše misli, 1878)
- Risanje in njega razmerje do moderne pedagogike (in Slovan, 1910)
- Osamosvojimo se! (in Slovenski narod 35, 1920)
- Umetnost in vzgoja (in Šolski tovariš, 1920)
- Misli o umetniški vzgoji na narodnih šolah (in Popotnik, 1923)
- Das Zeichnen in der Volksschule Anleitung für die Hand des Lehrers (Leipzig, 1917)
