= Teharje camp =

Concentration camp near Teharje, Slovenia

- Concentration camp and penal camp
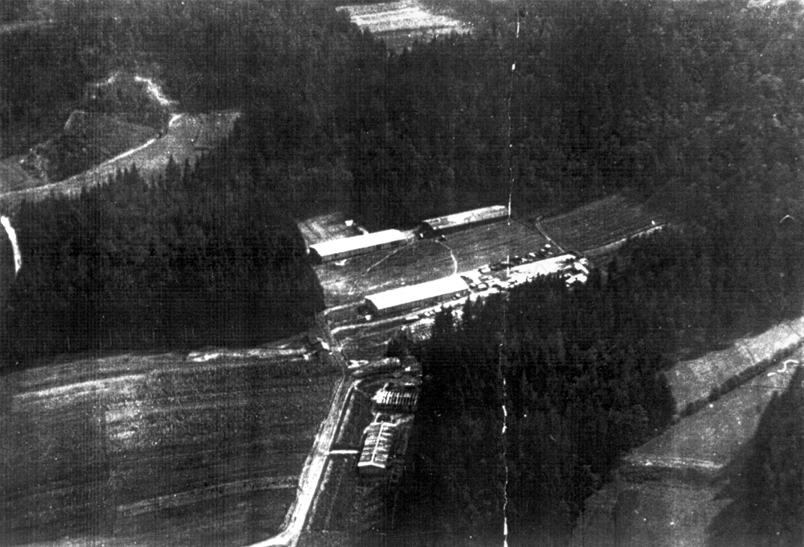
- Teharje camp in 1943
- Coordinates: 46.2368°N 15.3183°E
- Location: Teharje, PR Slovenia, FPR Yugoslavia (modern-day Slovenia)
- Operated by: Yugoslav secret police
- Operational: May 1945 - October 1946
- Inmates: Slovene Home Guard; Volksdeutsche
- Killed: 5,000

The Teharje camp (Slovene: taborišče Teharje) was a concentration camp near Teharje, Slovenia, organised by the Yugoslav secret police (OZNA) after the end of World War II in Yugoslavia. It was primarily used for the internment of Slovene Home Guard prisoners of war, ethnic Germans, and Slovene civilians.

The camp was built in 1943 by German forces and was used as a military camp for Hitler Youth. It had six residential barracks and ten other buildings. The camp was abandoned for a short time after the war, but was reactivated by the Yugoslav communists at the end of May 1945 to accommodate former members of the Slovene Home Guard and others that had collaborated with the Axis, as well as civilians that had fled before the advancing Yugoslav People's Army to Allied camps in Austrian Carinthia. On 31 May 1945, the entire 2nd Assault Battalion of the Slovene Home Guard, headed by Vuk Rupnik, was brought to Teharje, and in the first days of June 1945 approximately 3,000 additional members of the Slovene Home Guard joined them. It is estimated that the postwar authorities executed approximately 5,000 internees of Teharje without trial during the first month or two after the Second World War.

A memorial park designed by Slovenian architect Marko Mušič was built on the site of the camp in 2004, where an annual ceremony is held by the Government of Slovenia.

== Background ==
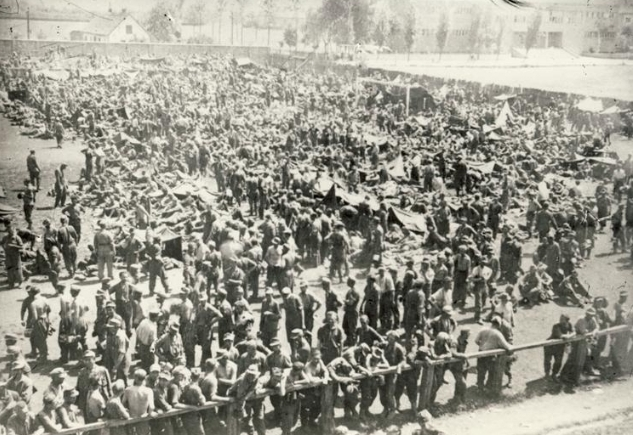
Axis POWs at the town of Celje in May 1945

After the occupation of Yugoslavia in April 1941, the area of Slovenia was divided into three parts between Germany, Italy and Hungary. On 27 April 1941, Liberation Front (Osvobodilna fronta) was established in Ljubljana as the main anti-fascist organization. The armed resistance started after the German invasion of the Soviet Union in July 1941. The Italian authorities sponsored local anti-communist units that served as auxiliary troops in fighting the Slovene Partisans. Following the capitulation of Italy in September 1943, Germany took over the Italian provinces in Slovenia and united the Slovene anti-communist units into the Slovene Home Guard.

At the end of the war, Croatian and German forces began retreating to the Austrian border through Slovenia. Slovene forces also began retreating and on 12 May 1945, around 30,000 soldiers, including 10,000 to 12,000 Slovenes, 10,000 Germans, 4,000 Serbs, 4,000 members of the Russian Corps, and 6,000 Slovene civilians, surrendered to the British forces on the Austrian border.

== Establishment ==
The camp was built by the Germans near the town of Teharje in the summer of 1943 to accommodate members of the Hitler Youth (Hitlerjugend). It had six large barracks and four courtyards where members of the organization trained shooting, learned geography and played sports.

The OZNA (Department of National Security) took over the camp in May 1945 and turned it into a prison camp for internees in the Celje area. A report from the OZNA on 16 May stated "in addition to the prison, we established a concentration camp at Teharje". Additional 16 building were erected, including a warehouse and a bunker under it, used as a torture chamber. In total there were 17 large barracks, six in the central part of the camp and the rest on the surrounding slopes. Every barrack and courtyard was separately fenced with wire. The whole complex, about 500 meters wide and 800 meters long, was surrounded with barbed wire fences. Outside of the fence were spotlights and five guard posts of machine gun bunkers or watch towers. The commander of the camp was Tone Turnher.

== Arrival of prisoners ==
The People's Defence Corps of Yugoslavia (KNOJ) organized the transports of prisoners to Teharje. First of them were detainees from the Stari Pisker prison in Celje. A report from 16 May 1945 mentions that there were 1.088 internees in the Teharje camp, most of whom were captured in raids carried out by the KNOJ in Celje. Slovene prisoners were separated from others that were turned over to the 3rd Army or military authorities of their countries. The OZNA conducted mass arrests of Germans from the Kočevje region (Gottscheers) that were also brought to Teharje. On 29 May, Marko Selin, Chief of the Celje OZNA, reported that a total of 252 prisoners were executed in the Celje district during May 1945.

The Slovene Home Guards that surrendered to the British forces in May 1945 were interned in the Vetrinje (Viktring) camp near Klagenfurt, Austria. From 27 May to 31 May they were brought by trains to Bleiburg and repatriated to Yugoslavia, in total around 9,500 Home Guards and 600 civilians. Several thousand of them were taken by trains from the Austrian border at Dravograd towards the town of Celje. On 28 May, around 2,800 members of the 4th Home Guard Regiment and 200 civilians were transported from Bleiburg to Slovenj Gradec. The 3rd Home Guard regiment arrived in Slovenj Gradec on 29 May and were together with the first group sent by trains to nearby Velenje and from there to Celje, where they arrived on the morning of 1 July. Some of the prisoners managed to escape during the trip. On 30 May the 2nd Home Guard Regiment traveled from Bleiburg, across Maribor, and arrived in Celje on 31 May.

From the railway station of Celje they were taken by the OZNA and KNOJ through the town by foot towards the nearby Teharje camp, 7 kilometers east of Celje. During the whole trip prisoners were beaten and those that lagged behind were shot. Upon arrival to the camp they had to drop everything they had and were left only with their clothes. The Home Guards received no food on the first day. The camp was not suitable for the admission of prisoners from Bleiburg, but was chosen because it already had barracks and was near the town of Celje. In total around 4,000 to 5,000 Slovene Home Guards and civilians were transferred from Bleiburg to Teharje.

== Treatment of inmates ==
The Home Guards were placed in the courtyards, while civilians and Germans were placed in barracks. The barracks were 20 meters in length and 8 meters in width and had bunk beds, toilets and sinks. Windows had iron bars. Around the barracks was a narrow ditch that the Home Guards were forbidden to cross.

A list was made of every prisoner with their personal information and date of entry in the army. The lists were used to separate Home Guard POWs into three groups: group A consisted of juveniles, group B consisted of those mobilized in 1945, and group C included the rest. However, there were exceptions of this rule. Minors from group A were situated in a barrack and were told that they will be tried by People's Courts. The B group were also in a separate barrack, but a part of them were selected for execution. The majority of Home Guards were in group C and were placed on the open. The first two groups received two meals a day. The third group had the harshest treatment at the camp and were given no water and food for the first two and a half days. Later they received one meal daily and from 5 June two meals daily. They were sometimes allowed to bring water and share it with inmates, which depended on the guards.

Interned civilians in the camp were those accused of collaboration that were arrested in and around Celje, mostly Germans and Slovenes, and civilians that arrived with the Home Guard from Bleiburg, mostly family members. They had free access to water and had better food, but also suffered ill-treatment. At times, the OZNA guards would take female prisoners to the main barracks during the night where they were raped. Several witnesses reported that around 15 infants died on a wagon due to sun exposure.

Home Guard Officers were subjected to torture in the camp's bunker. One day a group of officers were blindfolded and brought outside the barrack. Among them was first lieutenant Anton Kavčič, whose wife Marija, daughter and two sons were among interned civilians. His daughter recognized him and started screaming, so the guards forced her to get back in the inmate barrack. His wife was then taken to the OZNA barrack where she was raped and killed.

Three underage Home Guards were killed after they were caught taking canned food from backpacks that were confiscated from them upon arrival.

== Massacres ==
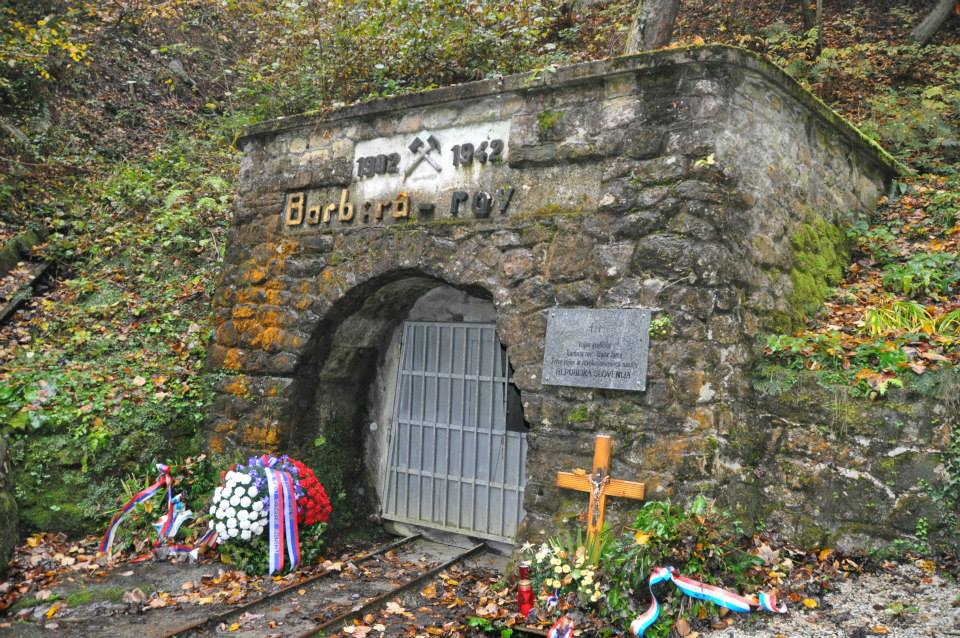
A large number of prisoners from Teharje were executed in the Barbara Pit massacre

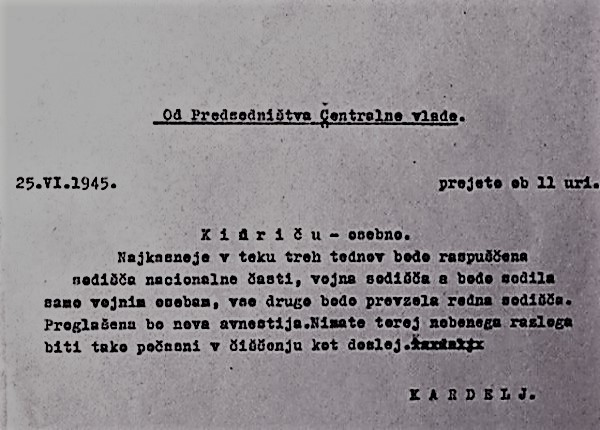
Deputy Prime Minister of Yugoslavia Edvard Kardelj's dispatch from June 1945, urging faster liquidations.

All prisoners from groups C and the majority from group B were taken to nearby pits, ditches or caves and executed there. The transfers of prisoners were mostly done at night. After hearing his name, the called out prisoner would step out and his hands were tied with telephone strings behind his back in pair with another prisoner, after which they would climb into the truck. The prisoners were told that they were being transported to another camp.

Among the first victims were members of the White Guard. One night they were called out, loaded onto trucks and busses and taken to the nearby valley where they were shot. Bursts of gunfire from the valley lasted for an hour. Home Guard officers were killed at Stari Hrastnik. Several officers managed to escape during the trip. The transport of others began on 5 June with the 2nd Home Guard Regiment. The OZNA engaged drivers from across the country to carry out the transports. The drivers were not informed about the details of the action. The locations were mostly nearby pit caves. Once they arrived, the prisoners were taken off tracks, ordered to take their clothes off, lined up along the edge of the pit and shot. Some of them survived the initial round and the fall into the cave, so their screams were heard for hours. In some cases the soldiers threw in hand grenades to finish those that were still alive.

Most of Home Guards from group C were killed by mid June. After their liquidation, the second wave of purges began, this time of Home Guards from group B. They were encouraged by a dispatch from Deputy Prime Minister of Yugoslavia Edvard Kardelj to Slovenian Prime Minister Boris Kidrič on 25 June that stated:

In three weeks at the latest, the courts of national honor will be dissolved, the military courts will only pass judgments on military personnel, everything else will be handled by the general courts. A new amnesty will be announced. So you have no reason to conduct the cleansing as slowly as you currently do.

By the end of June, mostly prisoners younger than 18 remained in the camp. A new selection was made and around 100 Home Guards were taken with trucks to the surroundings of Celje and killed there. On 21 June, 11 prisoners tried to escape from the camp. They cut through the first fence, managed to pass the guard and jumped over the second fence. Seven were caught and four managed to run away.

The largest mass grave of prisoners from Teharje is an abandoned coal mine in Huda Jama, where Home Guards were killed in the Barbara Pit massacre. Other mass grave locations include Hrastnik, Pečovnik, Marija Reka, Zgornja Hudinja, Prapretno and Bežigrad.

== Amnesty and camp dissolution ==
The first prisoners that were released from the camp were civilians at the beginning of July. Before they left, they were photographed and their fingerprints were taken. Between 19 and 24 July, a court-martial tried the remaining Home Guards. All of them were sentenced to penal labour, mostly for the duration of several months to one year. The AVNOJ presidency passed a decree on general amnesty and pardon on 3 August. 371 Home Guards were released during August in accordance with the amnesty. The camp was turned into a penal camp and renamed the Teharje Forced Labor Institute. It existed until October 1946, when most of the remaining prisoners were transferred to Maribor.

Yugoslav camps for forced labour formally existed until January 1946, when they were renamed "institutions for forced labour", but continued to operate the same way. Around 7,000 to 8,000 people passed through the Teharje camp. Out of 5,000 Slovene Home Guards, only several hundred were still in the camp when the general amnesty was given in August 1945. After the camp's closure, the barracks were removed. In 1974 the area of the former camp was turned into a waste depot for the chemical processing factory in Celje. A golf course was built on a part of the site.

== Memorial park ==
In 1993, the Slovenian government approved the plan to build a memorial park at the Teharje site, designed by Slovenian architect Marko Mušič. The memorial park, described as a "central symbolic monument of the Republic of Slovenia, dedicated to the memory of the victims of post-war killings in the territory of the country", was officially opened on 10 October 2004. It is the largest memorial in Slovenia. An annual ceremony in remembrance of the victims of post-World War II killings is held at the memorial site. In 2014, the park was recognised by the Slovenian government as a cultural monument of national significance.

== Notable people imprisoned or killed at the Teharje camp ==
- Ivan Hribovšek (1923–1945), poet, philologist, and translator
- France Kunstelj (1914–1945), author, playwright, and editor
- Tone Polda (1917–1945), writer and poet
- Jože Šerjak (1918–1945), writer and poet

== See also ==
- Kočevski Rog massacre
- Mass graves in Slovenia
