= Barbara Pit massacre =

1945 mass murders by Yugoslav partisans

- Part of the Bleiburg repatriations
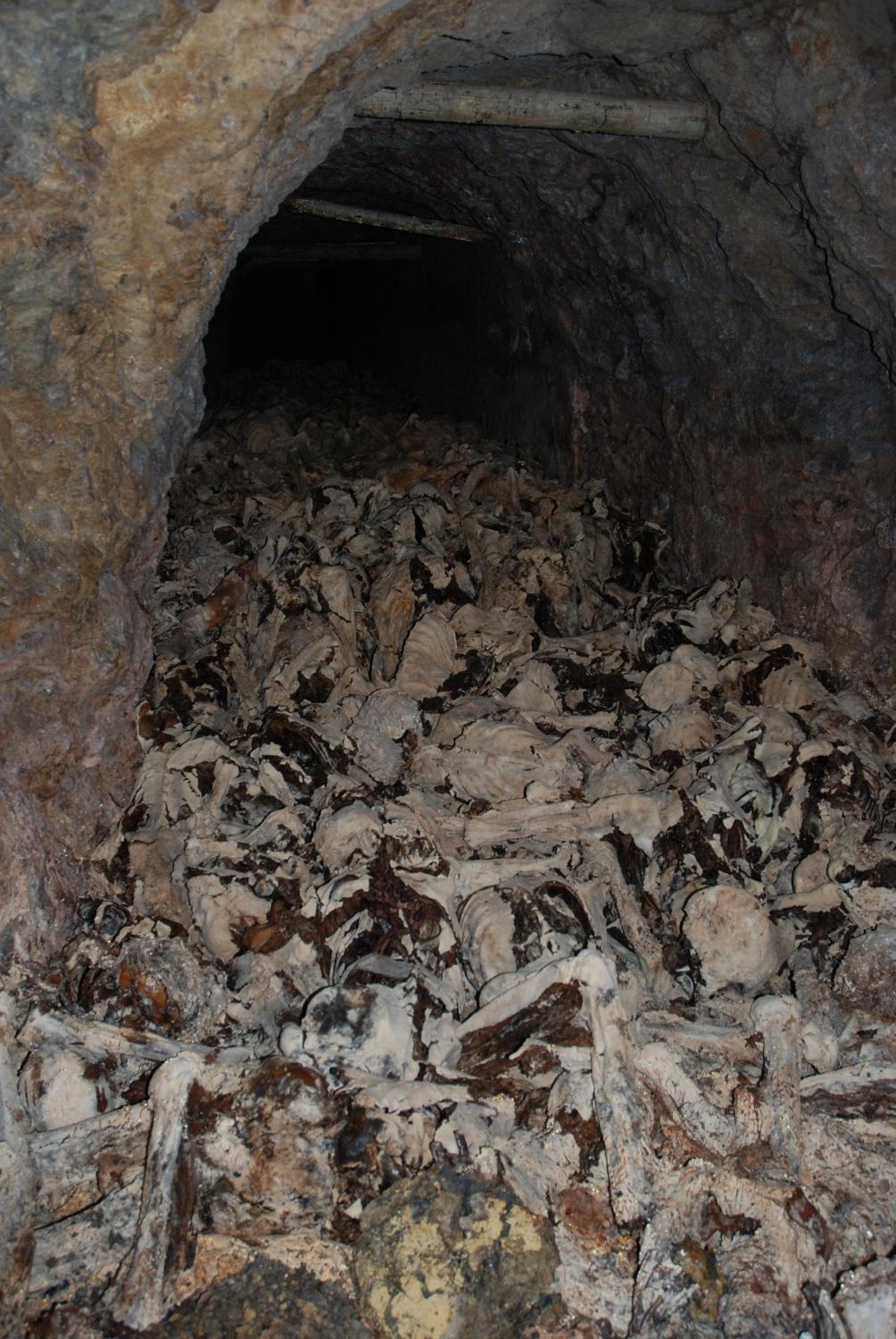
- Bodies in the mine
- Location: 46°9′31.46″N 15°11′10.28″E; Huda Jama, PR Slovenia, FPR Yugoslavia (modern-day Slovenia)
- Date: 25 May–6 June 1945
- Target: NDH Armed Forces; Slovene Home Guard; Croat and Slovene civilians
- Attack type: Massacre; Summary executions
- Deaths: 1,416
- Perpetrator: Yugoslav Partisans

The Barbara Pit massacre (Slovene: Pokol v Barbara rovu, Croatian: Pokolj u Barbarinom rovu), also known as the Huda Jama massacre, was the mass killing of prisoners of war of Ante Pavelić's NDH Armed Forces and the Slovene Home Guard, as well as civilians, after the end of World War II in Yugoslavia in an abandoned coal mine near Huda Jama, Slovenia. More than a thousand prisoners of war and some civilians were executed by the Yugoslav Partisans during May and June 1945, following the Bleiburg repatriations by the British. The location of the massacre was then sealed with concrete barriers and discussion about it was forbidden.

The mass grave site, one of the largest in Slovenia, was first publicly discussed in 1990, after the fall of communism in Yugoslavia. A memorial chapel was raised near the entrance to the mine in 1997. Investigation of the Barbara Pit mine began in 2008. It took several months for workers to remove concrete walls built after the war to seal the cave. On 3 March 2009, investigators found 427 unidentified bodies at a ditch in the mine. Another 369 corpses were found on the first five meters of a nearby shaft. The Barbara Pit mine was subsequently visited by the Croatian and Slovenian political leadership to pay tribute to the victims. On 25 October 2017, the Slovenian government announced that the remains of 1,416 victims were exhumed from the site and reburied at the Dobrava memorial park in Maribor.

== Background ==
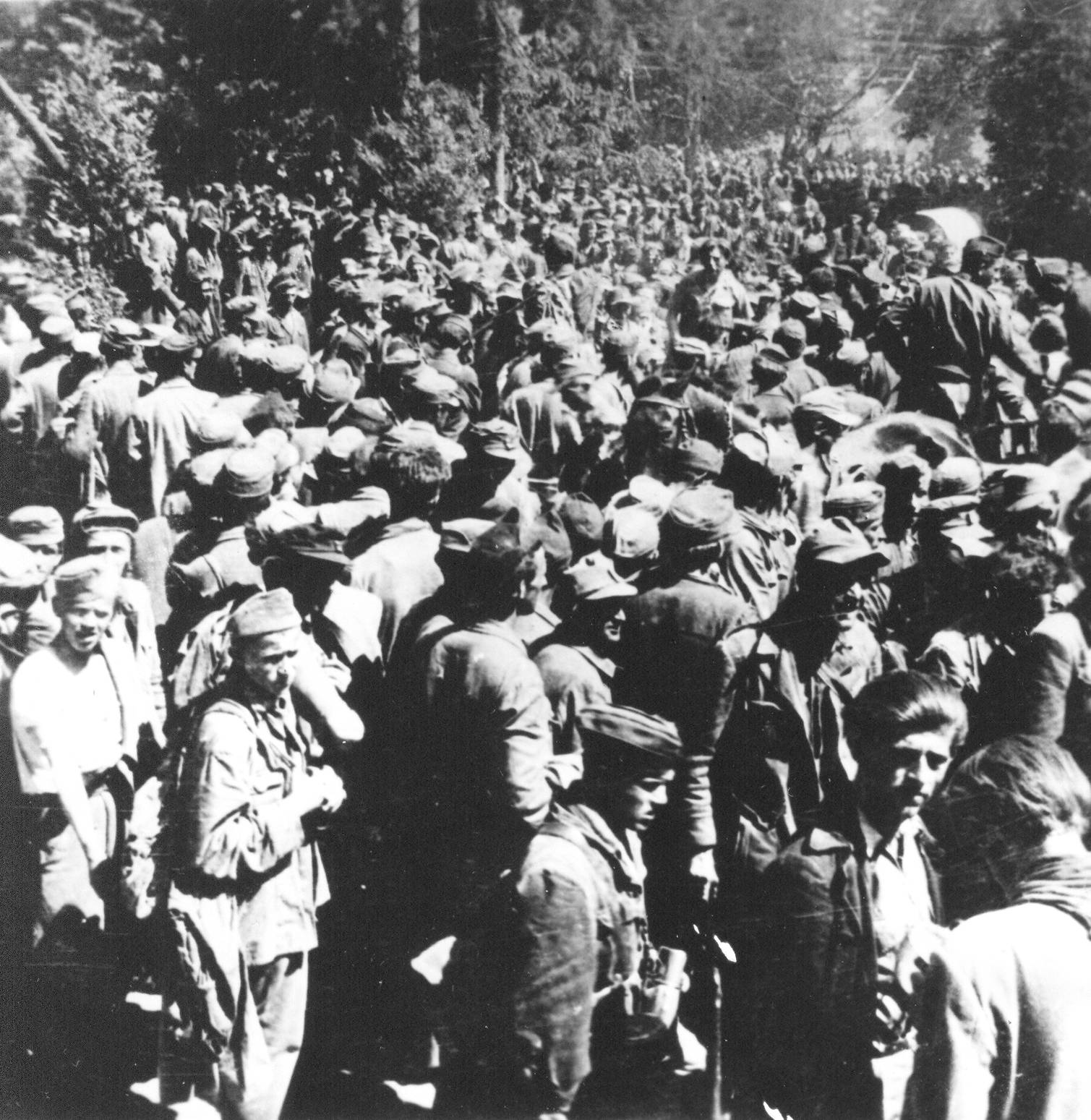
POWs of the Croatian Armed Forces at the town of Bleiburg in May 1945

During World War II, the Barbara Pit mine, a coal mine located 16 kilometers (9.9 mi) south of the town of Celje, was used by the Germans for coal production. The mine was closed in May 1944.

With the collapse of the Independent State of Croatia (NDH) in May 1945, its Armed Forces, together with other Axis troops, started retreating towards Austria in order to surrender to the British forces. On 3 May 1945, the NDH leadership abolished racial laws and intended to seek Western support in fighting Communism. On 6 May they sent a request for collaboration with the Allies, which was rejected. The Yugoslav Partisans took control of Zagreb, the capital of NDH, on 8 May. The retreating columns marched through Slovenia and were accompanied by many civilians. By 14 May, several thousand troops were admitted by the British. On 15 May, the main column reached the town of Bleiburg, where their surrender was rejected and were repatriated to the Yugoslav Partisans. Those that were previously taken into British captivity were returned to Yugoslavia between 18 and 31 May, including around 10,000 Slovene Home Guards.

The prisoners were subjected to forced marches by the Yugoslav authorities. Transit and detention camps were set across Slovenia where a selection was made. The OZNA (Department of National Security) issued precise instructions on dealing with prisoners of war. An instruction issued on 6 May 1945 by the OZNA stipulated that prisoners were to be liquidated:

The stance on captured officers and prisoners complies with earlier instructions. Officers are to be purged without exception, unless you receive notification from the OZNA or Party that an individual is not be liquidated. In general, no mercy is to be shown in purges and liquidation.

== Arrival at the Teharje camp ==
Several thousand Slovene Home Guard POWs were taken by trains from the Austrian border at Dravograd to Maribor and from there to the town of Celje. From the town's railway station they were sent through Celje by foot towards the nearby Teharje camp, a prison camp that was administered by the OZNA. During the trip the prisoners were beaten and those that lagged behind were shot. There were also civilians in the columns. Their valuables were taken from them upon arrival at the camp. German civilians from the Kočevje region (Gottscheers) were also brought to Teharje. The Home Guard POWs were separated into three groups: the first group consisted of minors, the second consisted of those that were members of the Home Guard for less than five months, and the third group included others. However, there were exceptions of this rule. The third group had the harshest treatment at the camp and were often without water and food. Around 7,000 to 8,000 people passed through the Teharje camp.

Prisoners from the third group were set for liquidation. Their hands were tied in pair with another inmate and were meant to be transported by trucks to nearby execution sites. The OZNA engaged drivers from across the country to carry out the transports. The drivers were not informed about the details of the action.

== Massacre ==
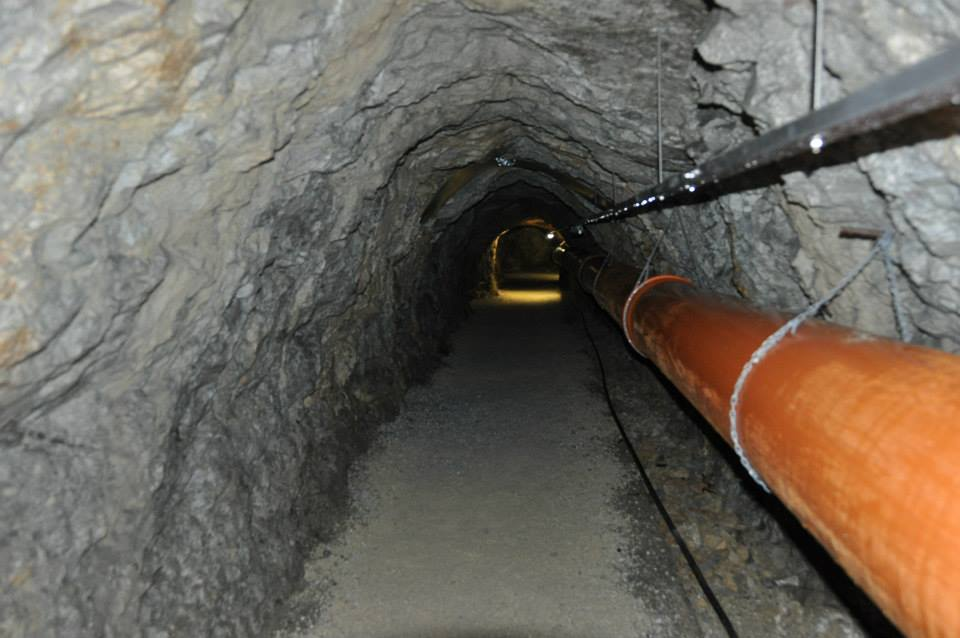
Interior of the Barbara Pit

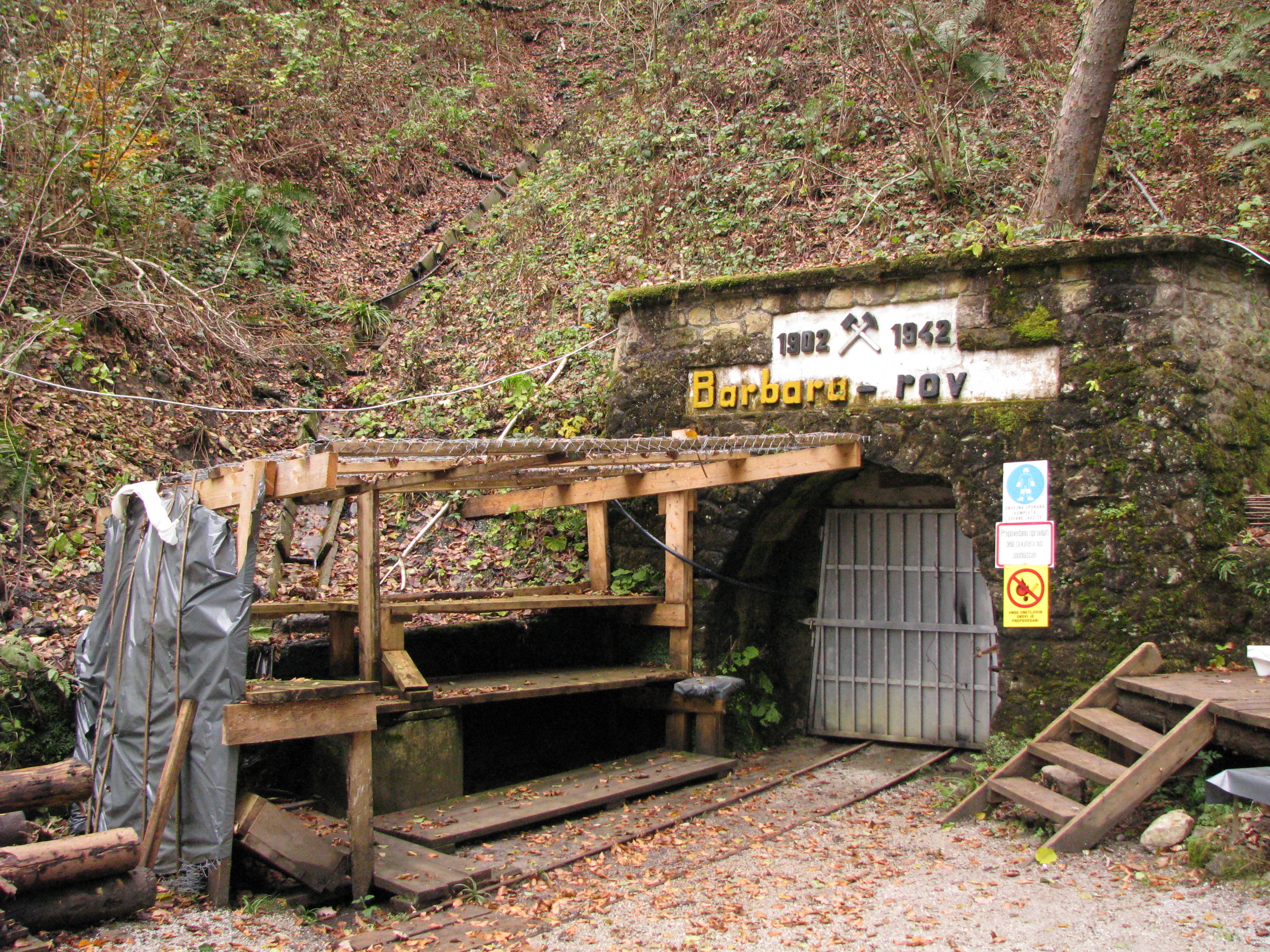
Entrance to the Barbara Pit in 2009

In late May and June 1945, when the Yugoslav army started emptying its prison camps in Slovenia, prisoners from the Teharje camp and the Stari Pisker prison were brought by trucks at night to the abandoned Barbara Pit mine in Huda Jama. Slovene Home Guard POWs that were singled out in Slovenj Gradec, Velenje, Kranj and Celje were the first ones to arrive on the last week of May. NDH troops were brought on foot. Once arrived, groups of 5–6 prisoners with hands tied with wire were stripped, ordered to kneel above a mine shaft and shot in the head, or were hit with a mine hammer or a pickaxe. In some cases, groups of 20–30 prisoners were tossed into a mine shaft, followed with hand grenades to finish off the victims. A number of prisoners were thrown in alive. Once the shafts were filled with corpses, the remaining prisoners were sent in the direction of Zagorje in northwest Croatia where they were killed, while the bodies were covered with lime to speed up decomposition. The mine was then enclosed with 400 cubic meters of concrete and wooden barriers. Those still conscious tried to climb over each other to reach the hatch, but could not escape the sealed mine.

The liquidations were carried out by the 3rd Brigade of the Slovenian KNOJ (People's Defence Corps of Yugoslavia) Division. More than a thousand people were killed in the massacre. Most of the victims were prisoners of war, members of the NDH Armed Forces and Slovene Home Guard, and civilians. There are no records of survivors.

== Aftermath ==
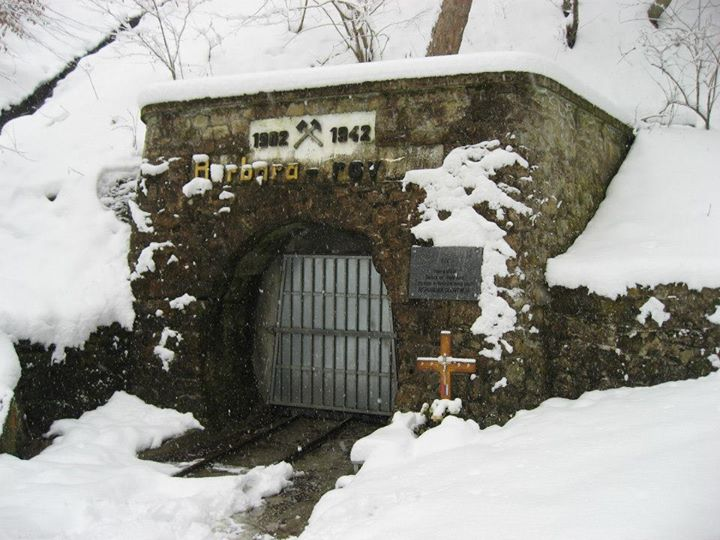
Entrance to the Barbara Pit in 2013

It is estimated that at least 70,000 to 80,000 people were killed in the Bleiburg repatriations. More than 600 mass grave sites are located in Slovenia, which the Yugoslav authorities concealed and prohibited discussion about the massacres.

The part of the Barbara Pit mine where the killings took place was hermetically sealed. The rest was put into operation on 1 November 1945 and produced coal until 1992. There is no written data about the massacre in Yugoslav archives. One of the earliest mentions of the event is connected to a judicial proceeding from May 1947, when five people were sentenced to death on spying charges, including a 32-year-old pregnant woman who claimed that Yugoslav authorities were beating and killing POWs at Brežice, Košnica pri Celju, and Huda Jama.

== Investigation ==
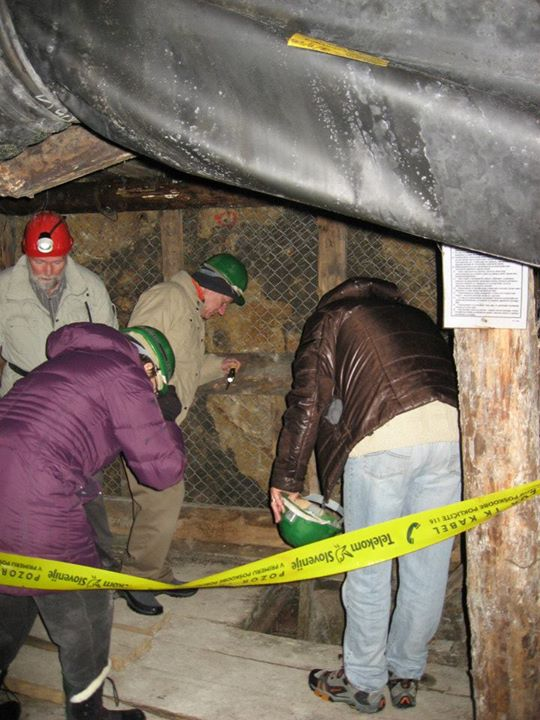
US Ambassador Joseph A. Mussomeli visiting the site in 2013

The first official studies of the site began in November 1989 when a criminal report was filed against unknown perpetrators for the killing of an undetermined number of prisoners at Huda Jama. The state prosecution forwarded the report to the Celje Police Department in October 1991. A decade later, in 2001, the Slovenian police began a formal investigation of the graves at Huda Jama. In January 2008, the Commission on Concealed Mass Graves in Slovenia decided to inspect the Barbara Pit. The first of eleven barriers was set 300 meters after the entrance. It was breached on 24 July 2008. It took workers eight months to remove 400 m^{2} (4,300 sq ft) of gangue and penetrate eleven reinforced concrete partition walls (each 1 metre (3 ft 3 in) thick) to reach the graves. The first corpse was found on 23 February 2009, 449 meters into the mine, near the 9th barrier. The victim appeared to have survived the slaughter and managed to dig through 7–8 meters of soil until he reached an impassable concrete door and ran out of oxygen. On 3 March 2009, investigators found a mass of 427 corpses that were largely mummified due to the lack of oxygen in the mine. Hair, skin, ears and nails were still visible on the corpses. Excavating a further 5 metres (16 ft) into a 45 meter deep mine shaft uncovered another 369 corpses.

Andreja Valić, head of the Slovenian Research Centre for National Reconciliation, said upon the discovery of the mass grave that "current information, based on oral testimony, indicate that the slain people could have been Slovenian or Croatian citizens". Further investigation showed that most of the victims were Croats and Slovenes. The researchers found orthopedic equipment and bandages among the corpses, meaning that wounded soldiers were also among the victims. Several pigtails plaited from women's hair were also discovered.

Jože Dežman, head of the Commission, said that "this is one of 15 Slovenian Srebrenicas". Slovenian pathologist Jože Balažic commented: "The scenes that we found there indicate that the victims died in agony. All corpses are covered with lime and based on their body position it appears that the victims had been moving for a time." Pavel Jamnik from the Slovenian Criminal Police Directorate noted that "some victims were probably still conscious when their executioners scattered lime, which is cracked, which means that they moved. Several skeletons are sticking above the surface of the lime and it is obvious that they tried to pull out in agony". Croatian medical doctors offered their assistance in DNA analysis of the remains, which could potentially be used to identify Croat victims.

On 25 October 2017, more than eight years since the discovery of the massacre, the Slovenian Ministry of Labour, Family, Social Affairs and Equal Opportunities announced that, based on preliminary data of anthropological and archaeological analysis, a total of 1,416 victims were found in the coal mine. Remains of 769 individuals were exhumed from the site in 2009 and another 647 in 2016. Among them there were 21 women, while the youngest victims were 17 years old. Most of the victims are believed to be members of the military forces of NDH. On 6 March 2017, Slovenian anthropologist Petra Leben Seljak said that among the second group, exhumed in 2016, almost all were men older than 20 and younger than 40, while 8 percent were aged between 18 and 20.

== Political and institutional response ==
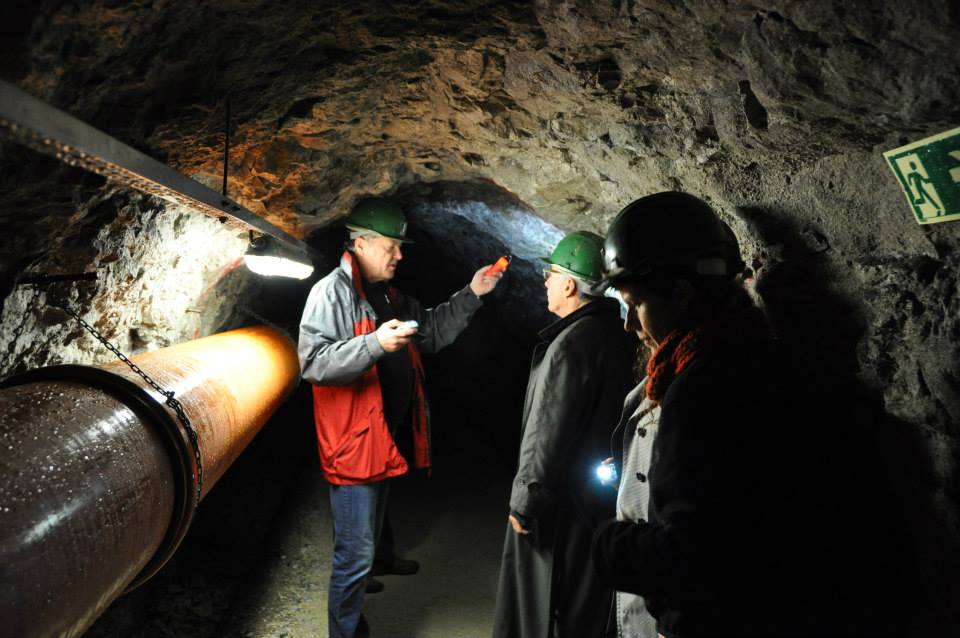
US Ambassador Brent R. Hartley at the Barbara Pit in 2015

The first high-ranking official to visit the mass grave after the uncovering on 3 March 2009 was the Slovenian General Prosecutor Barbara Brezigar, who described the scene as "horrific". In the following days, the site was visited by Slovenian Member of European Parliament and former Prime Minister Lojze Peterle. Peterle criticised President of Slovenia Danilo Türk for failing to visit the site. When asked to comment on the issue during a visit to the town of Trbovlje on 8 March, International Women's Day, only 10 kilometers away from the mass grave, Türk refused to comment on the issue, qualifying political manipulations with the mass grave as a "second rate topic". He dismissed the calls to visit the grave as "political manipulation". He subsequently condemned the crime, adding: "as I condemn all executions during and after the (Second World) war".

Türk's statements that these killings must be understood "in the context of World War Two" provoked the Slovenian Minister of Defence Ljubica Jelušič to maintain that there can be no excuse for not condemning the killings. Together with the Prime Minister and Speaker of the National Assembly, President Türk laid wreaths at the entrance to the mine on 1 November 2009.

On 9 March, Croatian Deputy Prime Minister Jadranka Kosor and Interior Minister Tomislav Karamarko visited the site and offered help in DNA identification. On 10 March, the Croatian government called for a joint Croatian–Slovenian investigation into the grave and the implementation of the 2008 agreement on the marking of military cemeteries. By 2013, the Slovenian government helped finance the arrangement of the site and the setup of walking paths, drainage, air ventilation and electrification.

== Commemoration ==
After the fall of communism, a memorial chapel was dedicated at the site in 1997. Shortly after its dedication the chapel was defaced and slogans were scrawled along the walls, including "Death to traitors" and "Death to fascism".

A commemoration was held on 13 June 2015, on the occasion of the massacre's 70th anniversary, that was attended by around 2,000 people. Among them was Slovenian President Borut Pahor, Catholic bishops from Croatia and Slovenia, and various delegations of Croatian and Slovenian organizations.

On 27 October 2016, 778 of the exhumed victims were transferred to the Dobrava cemetery in Maribor. The commemoration was attended by the Croatian leadership, including Prime Minister Andrej Plenković, President Kolinda Grabar-Kitarović and Speaker Božo Petrov, Church dignitaries, and Slovenian President Borut Pahor. At a Croatian government session on the same day, Plenković said that "the burial of victims of post-war communist terror in Huda Jama reminds us of our debt to the victims of totalitarianism".

== See also ==
- Mass graves in Celje
- Kočevski Rog massacre
- Tezno massacre
- Foibe massacres
- Mass killings under communist regimes
