= Marko Mušič =

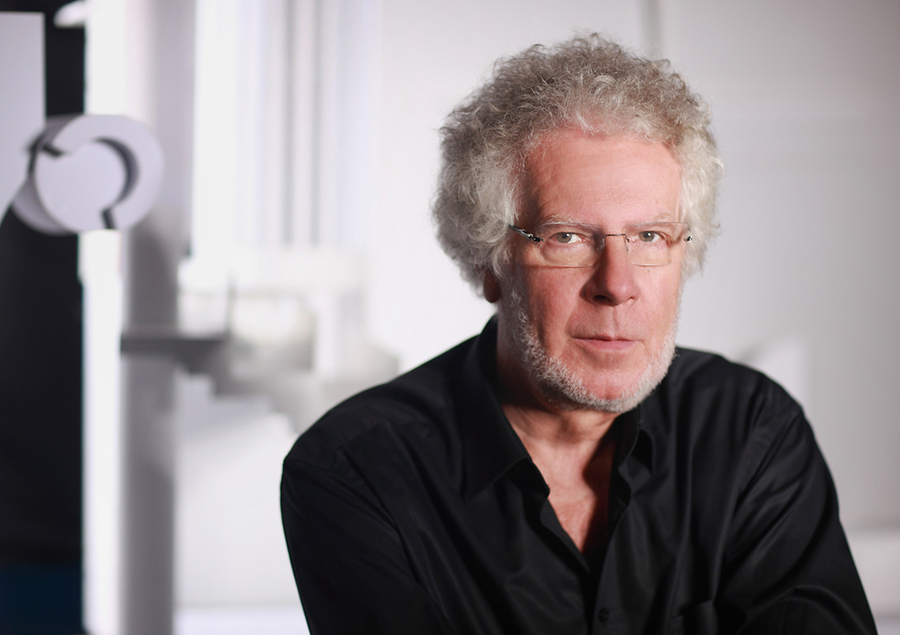
- Born: 30 January 1941
- Occupation: Architect
- Awards: Prešeren Fund Prize (2021); Plečnik Award; Valvasor Award

Marko Marijan Mušič (born 30 January 1941) is a Slovenian architect. He has designed buildings in cities such as Zagreb, Skopje and Ljubljana.

== Education ==
Mušič studied architecture in Slovenia, the US and Denmark.

== Memberships ==
From May 2008 to December 2013 he has been a vice-president of the Slovenian Academy of Sciences and Arts (SAZU). He is also a member of the European Academy of Sciences and Arts, the Montenegrin Academy of Sciences and Arts, the Croatian Academy of Sciences and Arts (HAZU), and the Academy of Sciences and Arts of Bosnia and Herzegovina.

== Works ==
- Hall of the Seven Secretaries of the League of Communist Youth of Yugoslavia (SKOJ), Zagreb (1966)
- University Center, Skopje (1975–1978)
- Memorial Hall, Bosanski Šamac (1975–1978)
- Ljubljana railway station (1980)
- Incarnation Church, Dravlje, Ljubljana (1980–1985)
- New Žale Cemetery (1982–1988)
- Saint Francis's Church, Kotor Varoš (1986–1991)
- Domus Slovenica, Vienna (1987–1988)
- Novo Mesto Bus Station (1989)
- New National and University Library of Slovenia (NUK II) (1989)
- Hercules Fountain, Old Square, Ljubljana (1991)
- Teharje Memorial Park (1993)
- Apostolic Nunciature to Slovenia project (1998)

== Awards ==
Mušič was awarded the Prešeren Fund Prize for outstanding achievements in 2021. He also won the Plečnik Award and the Valvasor Award.

== Sources ==
- Slovenian Academy of Sciences and Arts (in Slovene)
