= France Kunstelj =

Slovene author, playwright, and editor (1914–1945)

- Born: November 22, 1914; Vrhnika, Kingdom of Yugoslavia
- Died: June 1945; Teharje camp
- Occupations: Author, playwright, and editor

France Kunstelj (November 22, 1914 – June 1945) was a Slovene Roman-Catholic priest, author, playwright, and editor.

== Life ==
Kunstelj was born in Vrhnika. He started studying theology in Ljubljana in 1935, and he was ordained in 1941. He served as a curate in Mirna until mid-1942, when he was withdrawn to Ljubljana. At the bishop's order, he traveled to Rome in 1943 for a charity campaign, and he then visited the concentration camp in Padua. After his return to Slovenian territory in 1943, he was officially appointed curate for the Mirna Valley military outpost, but in fact he served in the Slovene Home Guard outpost in Rovte, to which he was officially appointed in 1944. In the aftermath of the German capitulation, he attempted to flee to Austria in May 1945, but was interned by the Allies at the camp at Viktring and deported back to Yugoslavia, where he was imprisoned in the Teharje camp. There, after his captors realized that he was a priest, he was tortured because he gave absolution to others. He was among those that were murdered in the camp itself.

== Literary work ==
Kunstelj began publishing his first prose works in the magazine Domače vaje, and then as a theologian in the anthology Mlada setev, which he also edited from 1937 to 1941. At the same time, he also published his short prose in Catholic magazines, especially in Mladika, Vigred, and Dom in svet. He drew the material for his works from the Vrhnika environment, and his sketches and short stories depicted people's poverty, social injustice, and the depravity of life. In works with religious motifs, however, ethical considerations appear. In 1945, he had a prose collection ready for printing, but it was not published due to his exile; it was not until 1975 that Tine Debeljak published his anthology, titled Butara, in Buenos Aires. Kunstelj also wrote works for the theater. He wrote several plays for amateur theaters; his three-act play Za velikim vzorom was published in 1972 in Buenos Aires.
