= Maribor prison massacres =

The Maribor prison massacres were a series of massacres perpetrated by the Germans against the ethnic Slovenian population in the city of Maribor, which had been annexed by Nazi Germany, in present-day Slovenia. The Germans systematically murdered a total of 689 political prisoners from Maribor and surrounding areas as a retaliatory measure in response to Partisan activity. Those that were shot had been arrested for supplying the Partisan forces with food, weapons, and other aid.

== Background ==
Maribor as most of Slovene Lands had been part of the Kingdom of Yugoslavia since 1918. In 1941 Nazi Germany attacked and defeated Yugoslavia, quickly establishing an occupation system. Maribor together with Slovenian Styria was annexed to Nazi Germany and a brutal process of Germanisation began.

== Massacres ==
The massacres of ethnic Slovenians in Maribor range from 1941 and all the way to April 1945. The first massacre was perpetrated on 24 August 1941 and the last one only a month before the end of the war. The worst single massacre occurred on 2 October 1942, when the Germans murdered 143 Slovenian civilians.

== Aftermath ==
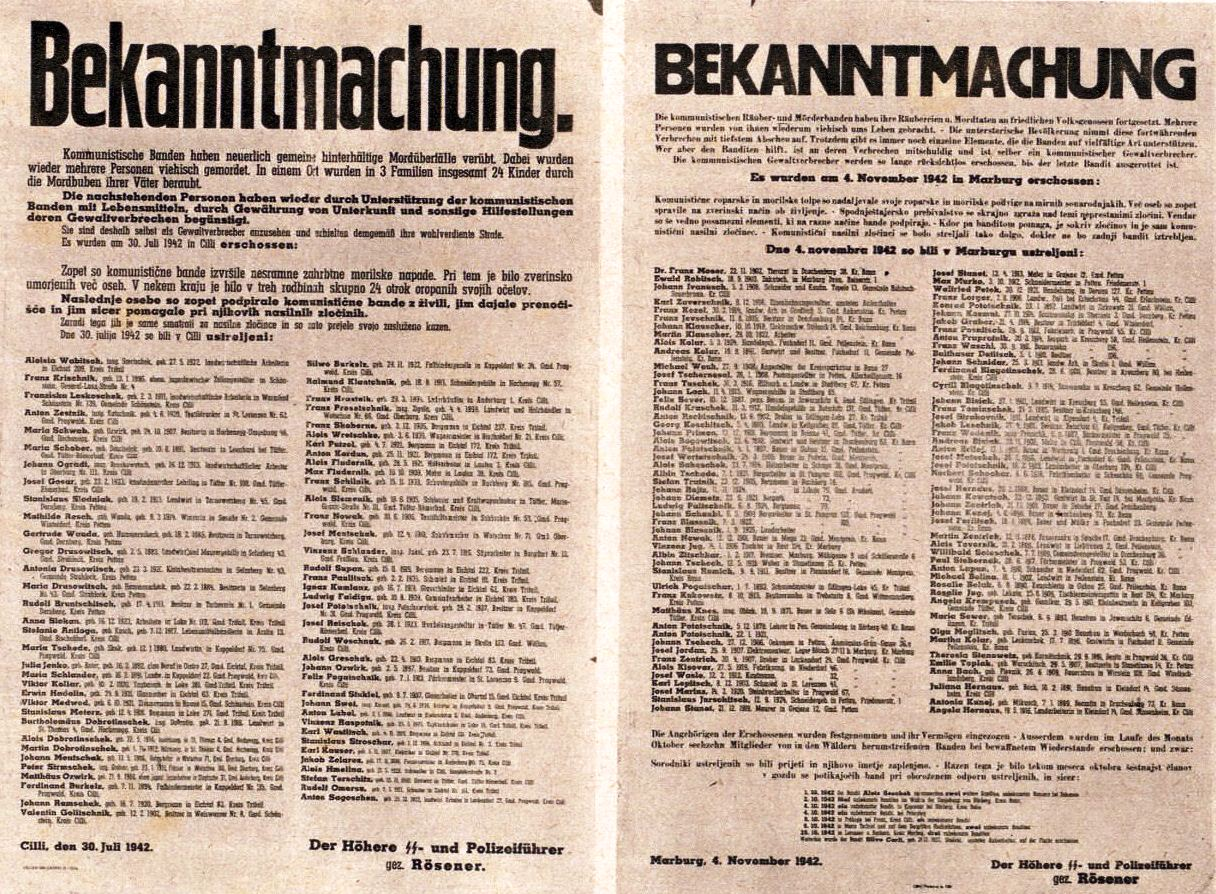
Proclamation of murdered Slovenian civilians in Celje (left) and Maribor (right)

After the war and the liberation of Maribor and Slovenia, Erwin Rösener was put on trial and found guilty of the Maribor prison massacres among others. He was hanged on 4 September 1946.

== See also ==
- List of massacres in Slovenia
