= Archives of the Republic of Slovenia =

National archives of Slovenia

Coordinates: 46°2′44.28″N 14°30′24.84″E

The Archives of the Republic of Slovenia (ARS) (Slovene: Arhiv Republike Slovenije) are the national archives of Slovenia. They were created in 1945, but have their origins in 1773. They are supervised by the Slovenian Ministry of Culture. They are located in the Gruber Palace in Ljubljana, the capital of Slovenia. Since March 2012, the archive's executive director has been Jože Dežman, who replaced Dragan Matić.

== 2011 conflict ==
In January 2011, Slovenian media reported that the Commission for Supervision of the Intelligence and Security Services (Supervisory Commission) would file a criminal complaint against Dragan Matić and the director of the Slovenian Intelligence and Security Service (SOVA) Sebastjan Selan for having denied the author Igor Omerza access to the archives of the former National Security Service. According to the president of the commission Zvonko Černač, the same archives had already been accessed in the past by a junior researcher. He believes that the opening of the archives would disclose sensitive information about people holding leading positions in Slovenia. He also stated that these archives taken to SOVA in October 2010 and returned to the Archives in November 2010.

On 25 January, Prime Minister Borut Pahor explained that Selan's actions were not due to some vested interest—for example, to protect someone—but because of a great danger that a problem threatening national security could emerge. He also stated that the withheld material concerned the activities of people that had been active outside the country. The Government of Slovenia decided in January 2011 to send a new bill sanctioning the withholding of some of the archives to the National Assembly through a fast-track procedure.

On 29 January, the opposition leader Janez Janša wrote a public letter to Borut Pahor, demanding that the prime minister call a meeting of the heads of all parliamentary parties and deputy groups of Slovenia regarding the closure of the archives. He stated that the incident was the first time in the history of Slovenia since the proclamation of independence in 1991 that a state institution had publicly announced it would not respect the law and had illegally curtailed citizen rights. According to Janša, this is also the first case since 1991 in which SOVA prevented the Supervisory Commission from inspecting it.

On 4 February 2011, the National Assembly passed a new act on the archives limiting the openness of the Archives, but it was rejected alongside economic reforms in a referendum on 5 June 2011 with over 70% of votes.

== 2012 leadership replacement ==
Dragan Matić served as the executive director from March 2010 until the newly elected Janša government replaced him in March 2012 with Jože Dežman. Matić characterised the replacement as politically motivated and pointed out that Dežman is not an archivist. Matić was the director of the Archives already in 2004 and 2005, but was then replaced by Janša's government with Matevž Košir, who then led the Archives until 2009, when Matić became the acting director. The government explained in March 2012 that Matić was replaced because he actively participated in the campaign before the June 2011 referendum, which was seen as inappropriate for an expert position. The Slovenian Democratic Party, led by Janša, characterised the appointment of Matić as the director of the archives as political in 2011.

== See also ==
- List of national archives
- List of archives in Slovenia
