= Huda Jama =

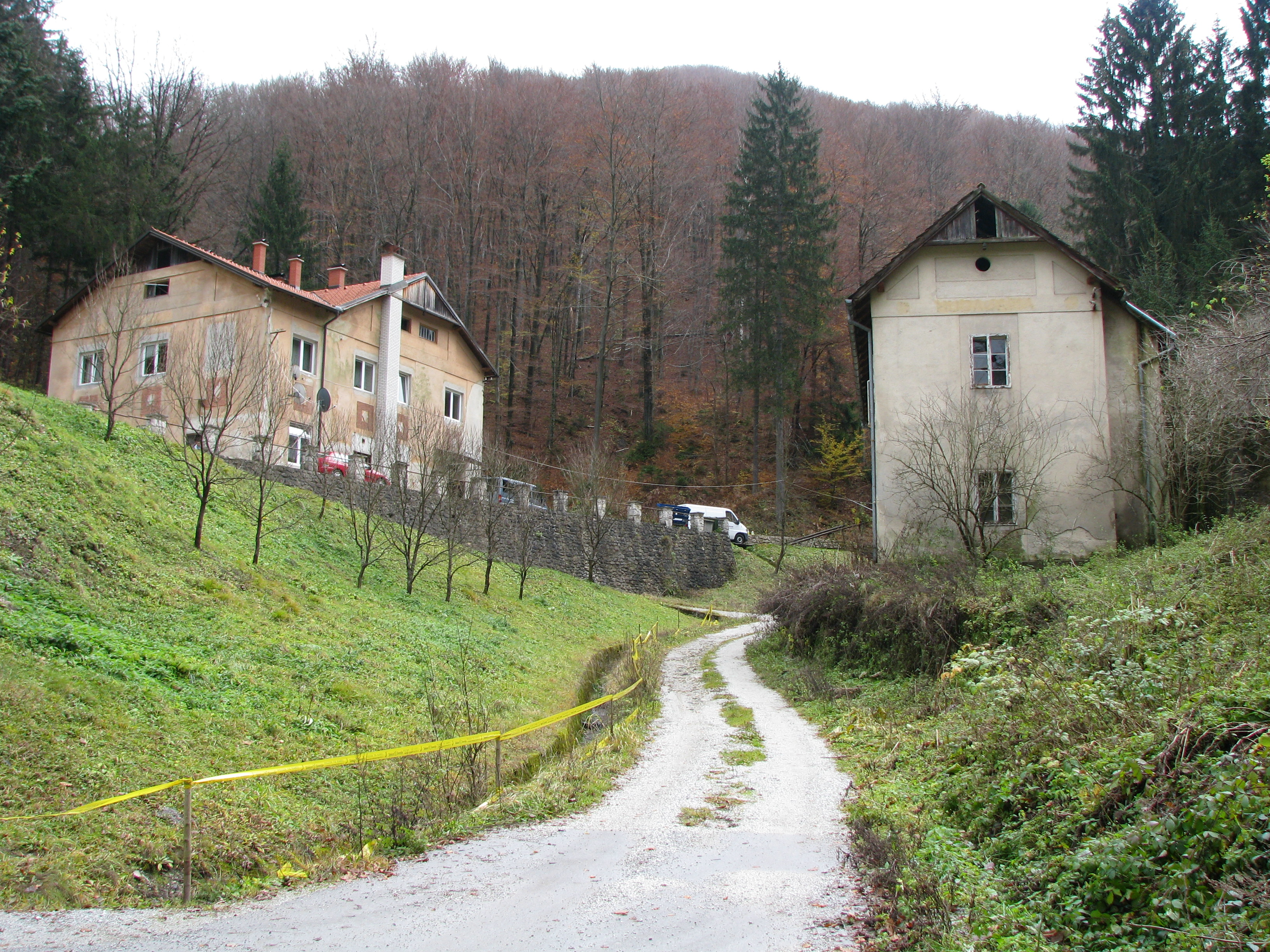
- Huda Jama, buildings near the defunct mine

- Location in Slovenia
- Coordinates: 46°9′31.46″N 15°11′10.28″E
- Country: Slovenia
- Traditional region: Styria
- Statistical region: Savinja
- Municipality: Laško

Area
  - Total: 0.81 km^{2} (0.31 sq mi)
- Elevation: 335.8 m (1,102 ft)

Population (2002)
  - Total: 71
- Postal code: 3270

Huda Jama (pronounced [ˈxuːda ˈjaːma], German: Hudajama) is a settlement west of Laško in east-central Slovenia. The area is part of the traditional region of Styria. It is now included with the rest of the Municipality of Laško in the Savinja Statistical Region.

== History ==
Lignite mining was begun at Huda Jama in 1813 by the Gadolla family. The mine was operated by various owners until 1855, when Paul von Putzer transferred operations to Brezno in 1855. Mining was resumed in Huda Jama in 1890. During the Second World War, the Partisans attacked German positions at Huda Jama on 2 July 1942 and 25 March 1944. After the second attack, they used the mine in the settlement as a shelter.

=== Mass grave ===
The Commission on Concealed Mass Graves in Slovenia has identified the site of a mass grave with remains of bodies of hundreds of victims of extrajudicial killings from the period immediately after the Second World War in a nearby abandoned coal mine known as the Barbara Pit (Slovene: Barbara rov), also known as the Huda Jama Mass Grave (Grobišče Huda jama) or the Saint Barbara Abandoned Mine Shaft Mass Grave. (Grobišče v opuščenem rudniškem jašku Sv. Barbara). It is presumed the victims, the exact number of which has not been determined, were Slovene Home Guard troops, Slovene and Croatian civilians, Ustaša soldiers, and Croatian Home Guard troops executed by the Partisans, and 10 percent of the victims were women. In 2009, 769 victims were exhumed from the site, and in 2016 an additional 647; they were interred in Dobrava Cemetery in southeastern Maribor.

== Notable people ==
Notable people that were born or lived in Huda Jama include:

- Franc Suher (1861–1944), schoolmaster and drawing methodologist
