= Dobova =

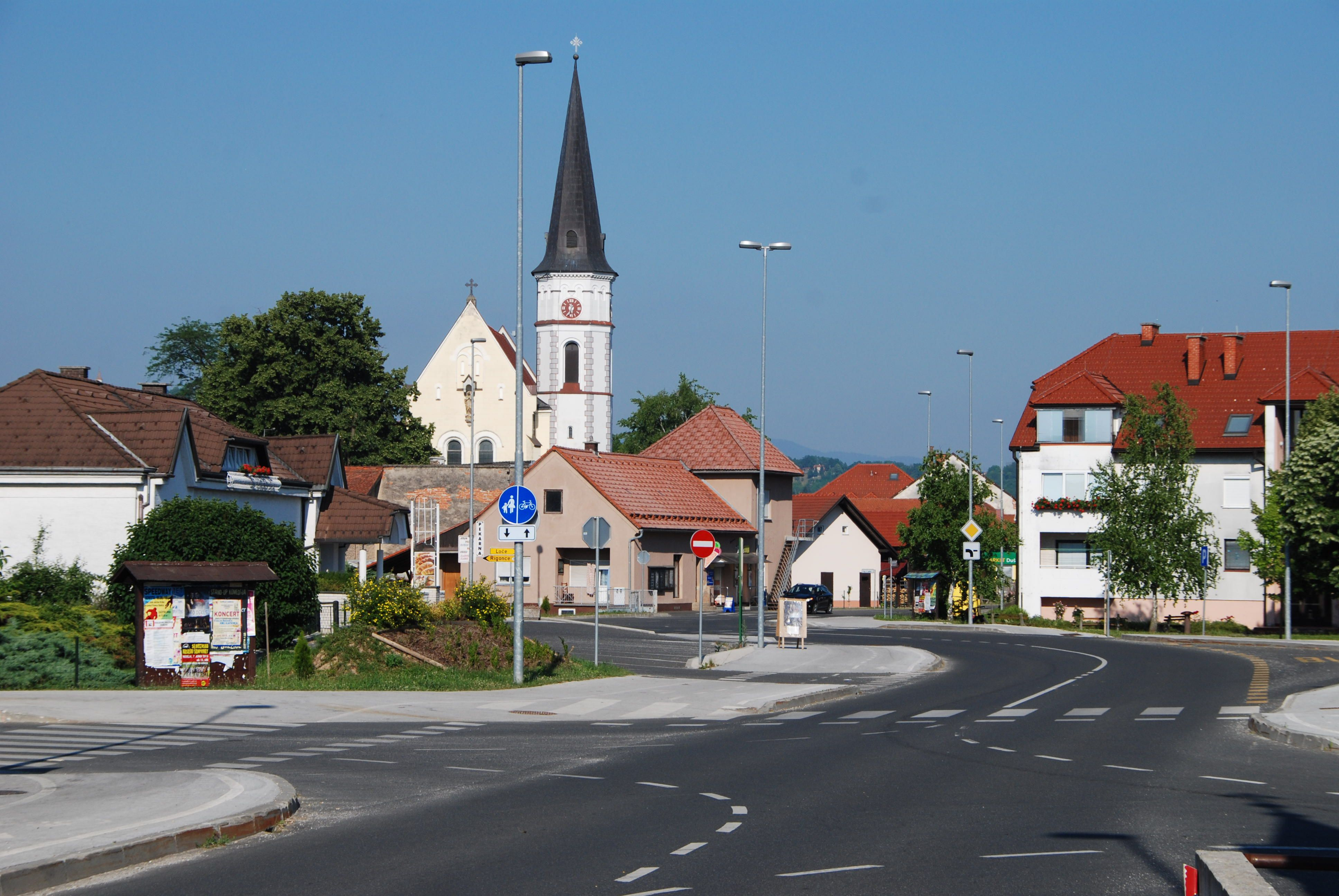

- Location in Slovenia
- Coordinates: 45°53′59.1″N 15°39′26.11″E
- Country: Slovenia
- Traditional region: Styria
- Statistical region: Lower Sava
- Municipality: Brežice

Area
  - Total: 2.54 km^{2} (0.98 sq mi)
- Elevation: 143.8 m (472 ft)

Population (2020)
  - Total: 703
  - Density: 277/km^{2} (717/sq mi)

Dobova (pronounced [ˈdoːbɔʋa]) is a settlement in the Municipality of Brežice in eastern Slovenia, close to the border with Croatia. The railway line from Ljubljana to Zagreb runs through the settlement and the station is an international railway border crossing. The area is part of the traditional region of Styria. It is now included with the rest of the municipality in the Lower Sava Statistical Region.

The local parish church is dedicated to the Holy Name of Mary and belongs to the Roman Catholic Diocese of Celje. It is a Neo-romanesque building with a triple nave, built on the site of two older churches in 1865.
