= Jože Dežman =

Slovenian historian

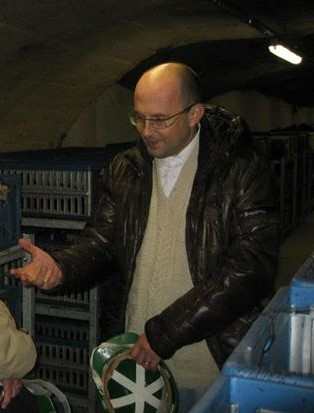
- Born: September 26, 1955 (age 70); Lesce, Upper Carniola, Slovenia
- Education: University of Ljubljana
- Occupations: Historian, museum curator, philosopher and editor

Jože Dežman (born 26 September 1955) is a Slovenian historian, museum curator, philosopher and editor. He served as the director of the National Museum of Contemporary History in Ljubljana. Since March 2012, he has been the director of the Archives of Slovenia, where he had replaced Dragan Matić. Matić characterised the replacement as politically motivated and pointed out that Dežman is not an archivist.

Dežman was born in the Upper Carniolan town of Lesce. He studied history and philosophy at the University of Ljubljana and finished his studies in 1997. For twenty years, he actively participated in the League of Communists of Slovenia and other Communist political organisations. In the 1990s, he was an active member of the liberal party Liberal Democracy of Slovenia. He later turned to more conservative positions. Since the mid-2000s, he has advocated the inclusion of anti-Communist perspectives in Slovenian historiography.

Dežman described the fundamental characteristics of the crimes following the Second World War as follows:

Killing civilians and prisoners of war after the Second World War is the greatest massacre of unarmed people of all times in Slovenian territory. Compared to Europe, the Yugoslav communist massacres after the Second World War are probably right after Stalinist purges and the Great Famine in the Ukraine. The number of those killed in Slovenia in the spring of 1945 can now be estimated at more than 100,000, Slovenia was the biggest post-War killing site in Europe. It was a mixture of events, when in Slovenia there are retreating German units, collaborator units, units of the Independent State of Croatia, Chetniks and Balkan civilians; more than 15,000 Slovenian inhabitants were murdered as well. Because of its brevity, number of casualties, way of execution and massiveness, it is an event that can be compared to the greatest crimes of communism and National Socialism.

Dežman was the first chairman of the Commission on Concealed Mass Graves in Slovenia. He contributed to the European Public Hearing on "Crimes Committed by Totalitarian Regimes" organized by Slovenian Presidency of the Council of the European Union (January–June 2008) and the European Commission by writing the chapter "Communist Repression and Transitional Justice in Slovenia" for the report.

== See also ==
- Slovenians
- Commission on Concealed Mass Graves in Slovenia
- European Public Hearing on "Crimes Committed by Totalitarian Regimes"
