= Dogoše =

- Location in Slovenia
- Coordinates: 46°31′24.72″N 15°42′18.92″E
- Country: Slovenia
- Traditional region: Styria
- Statistical region: Drava
- Municipality: Maribor

Area
  - Total: 5.56 km^{2} (2.15 sq mi)
- Elevation: 245.6 m (806 ft)

Population (2021)
  - Total: 769
- Climate: Cfb

Dogoše (pronounced [dɔˈɡoːʃɛ]) is a village and a suburb of Maribor on the right bank of the Drava River in northeastern Slovenia in the City Municipality of Maribor.

== Name ==
Dogoše was first attested in 1458 as Lendorf (and in 1763–87 as Dragosche, Landorf). Based on the 18th-century attestation, the toponym is derived from the personal name Dragoš. The name is believed to have originally been Dragoši, meaning 'Dragoš and his people'.

== History ==
Early settlement of the area is attested by the remnants of a building from antiquity along the road to Brezje (now part of Maribor). In addition to the building's foundations, the find included a small marble trough, which has been converted into a holy water font in the church in Brezje. Gold and silver Roman coins have also been found in the area. A fire station was built in Dogoše in 1928. Water mains were installed in the village in 1969.

=== Mass graves ===
Dogoše is the site of five known mass graves associated with the Second World War, known as the Tezno Woods 2–6 mass graves.

== Cultural heritage ==
A post-Baroque chapel shrine with simple furnishings stands along the road to Brezje. There is a large, masonry column-shrine from the first half of the 18th century along the road to Miklavž na Dravskem Polju.

== Notable natives ==
- Vekoslav Strmšek (1864–1907), educator
