= Commission on Concealed Mass Graves in Slovenia =

Office of the Slovenian government

The Commission on Concealed Mass Graves in Slovenia (Slovene: Komisija za reševanje vprašanj prikritih grobišč) is an office of the Slovenian government whose task is to find and document mass grave sites from the Second World War and the period immediately after it. It was established on November 10, 2005. The commission handed its report to the Slovenian government in October 2009.

The newspaper Jutranji reported the commission's findings; in all, it is estimated that there are 100,000 victims in 581 mass graves. The commission's findings were used for the Reports and Proceedings of the 8th of April European public hearing on Crimes Committed by Totalitarian Regimes organised by the Slovenian Presidency of the Council of the European Union (January–June 2008) and the European Commission.

According to the “Crimes Committed by Totalitarian Regimes," the killings were carried out by the Yugoslav Partisan Army in 1945 and 1946.

== Work ==
The commission has been consistently registering and gradually probing new grave sites.

- 2002: 40 sites
- January 2007: 512 sites
- August 2007: 550 sites
- February 2008: 570 sites
- October 2009: 581 sites
- January 2011: 594 sites

While the commission's own purpose is not to identify individual remains, research in Škofja Loka has revealed that DNA matches can still be made to identify victims.

=== Exhumations ===
- Barbara Pit, discovered in 2008. Remains of over 700 people were exhumed before work was stopped.
- Lancovo, discovered in 2007.
- Lokavec, discovered in 2004. Twelve bodies were exhumed in 2008.
- Mostec, discovered in 2010.
- Prevalje, discovered in 2010. Contains the remains of approximately 700 victims.

== Members ==
- Jože Dežman (Chairman of the commission, Director of the National Museum of Contemporary History)
- Miha Movrin
- Metka Černelč
- Majda Pučnik Rudl
- Ludvik Puklavec
- Davorin Mozetič
- Marko Štrovs
- Janez Črnej
- Blaž Kujundžič (Statistical Office of the Republic of Slovenia)
- Andrej Vovko
- Nataša Kokol Car
- Pavel Jamnik
- Davorin Vuga
- Milan Sagadin
- Jožef Bernik

=== Former members ===
- Mitja Ferenc
- Anton Drobnič

== See also ==
- Bleiburg repatriations
- Commission on Concealed Mass Graves in Serbia
- Foibe massacres
- Kočevski Rog massacre
- Tezno trench
