= Tezno massacre =

Mass killing of POWs and civilians of the Independent State of Croatia

- Part of the Bleiburg repatriations
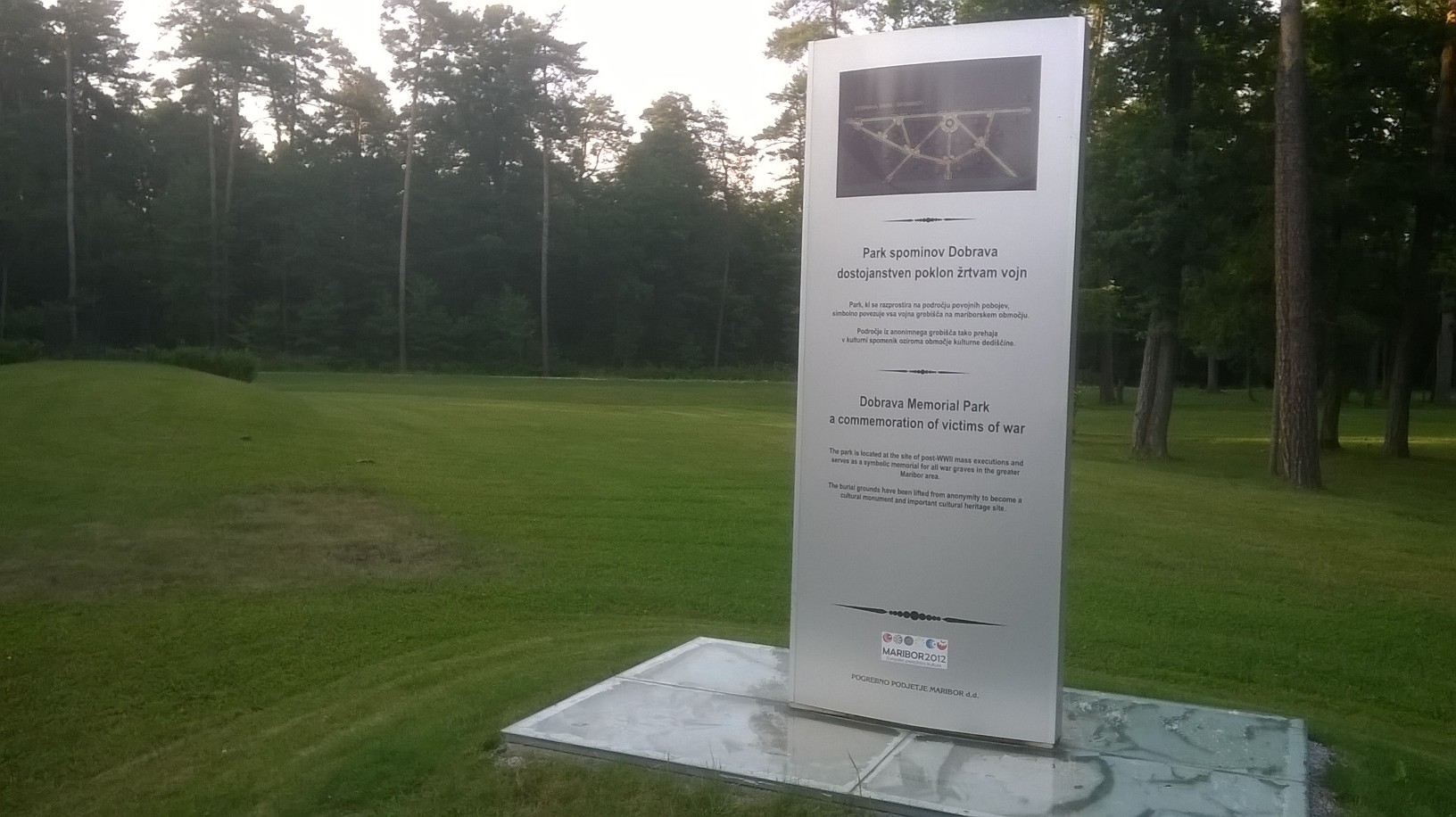
- Memorial to the victims in Tezno
- Location: 46°31′4.18″N 15°41′31.65″E; Tezno, PR Slovenia, Yugoslavia (now Slovenia)
- Date: 19–26 May 1945
- Target: NDH prisoners of war and civilians
- Attack type: Mass executions
- Deaths: 15,000
- Perpetrator: Yugoslav Partisans

The Tezno massacre (Croatian: Pokolj u Teznom) was the mass killing of POWs and civilians of the Independent State of Croatia (NDH) that took place in Tezno near Maribor after the end of World War II in Yugoslavia. The killings were perpetrated by units of the Yugoslav Partisans in May 1945, in the Bleiburg repatriations. Summary executions began on 19 May, when the first prisoners arrived in the Tezno Forest from nearby prison camps, and they continued until 26 May. Most of the bodies were buried in an antitank trench several kilometers long, which the Yugoslav authorities concealed and kept secret.

It is estimated that around 15,000 soldiers and civilians were killed in the massacre. The graves were discovered in 1999 during highway construction. Additional research on the burial sites was conducted in 2007 by the Commission on Concealed Mass Graves in Slovenia. In 2012, the Slovenian Government established a memorial park at Tezno, where an annual commemoration is held.

== Background ==
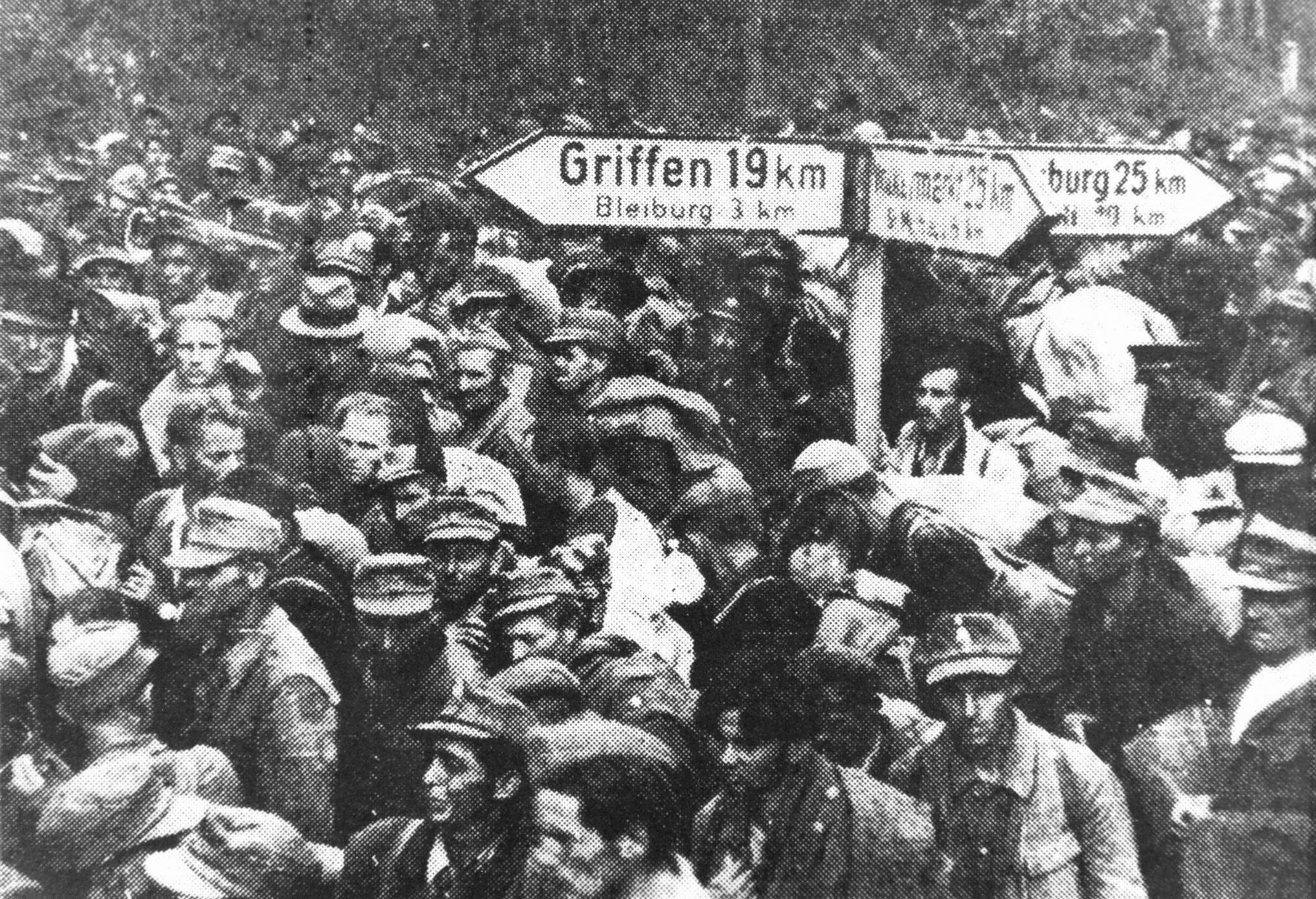
The retreating column approaching the town of Bleiburg in May 1945

In May 1945, at the end of World War II in Yugoslavia, soldiers of the Independent State of Croatia began retreating towards Austria, where British forces were located, with the intention to surrender to them rather than the advancing Yugoslav Partisans. Together with many civilians, the Croatian Armed Forces (HOS) fought their way to the Yugoslav–Austrian border and surrendered on 15 May to the British Army.

Around 25,000 reached the border, mostly the town of Bleiburg, while around 175,000 were spread in nearby columns that were dozens of miles long. However, the British Army refused their surrender on the grounds that all Axis troops should surrender to the armies they were fighting against. The prisoners of war at the border were thus repatriated to the Yugoslav Partisans.

== Forced marches and executions ==
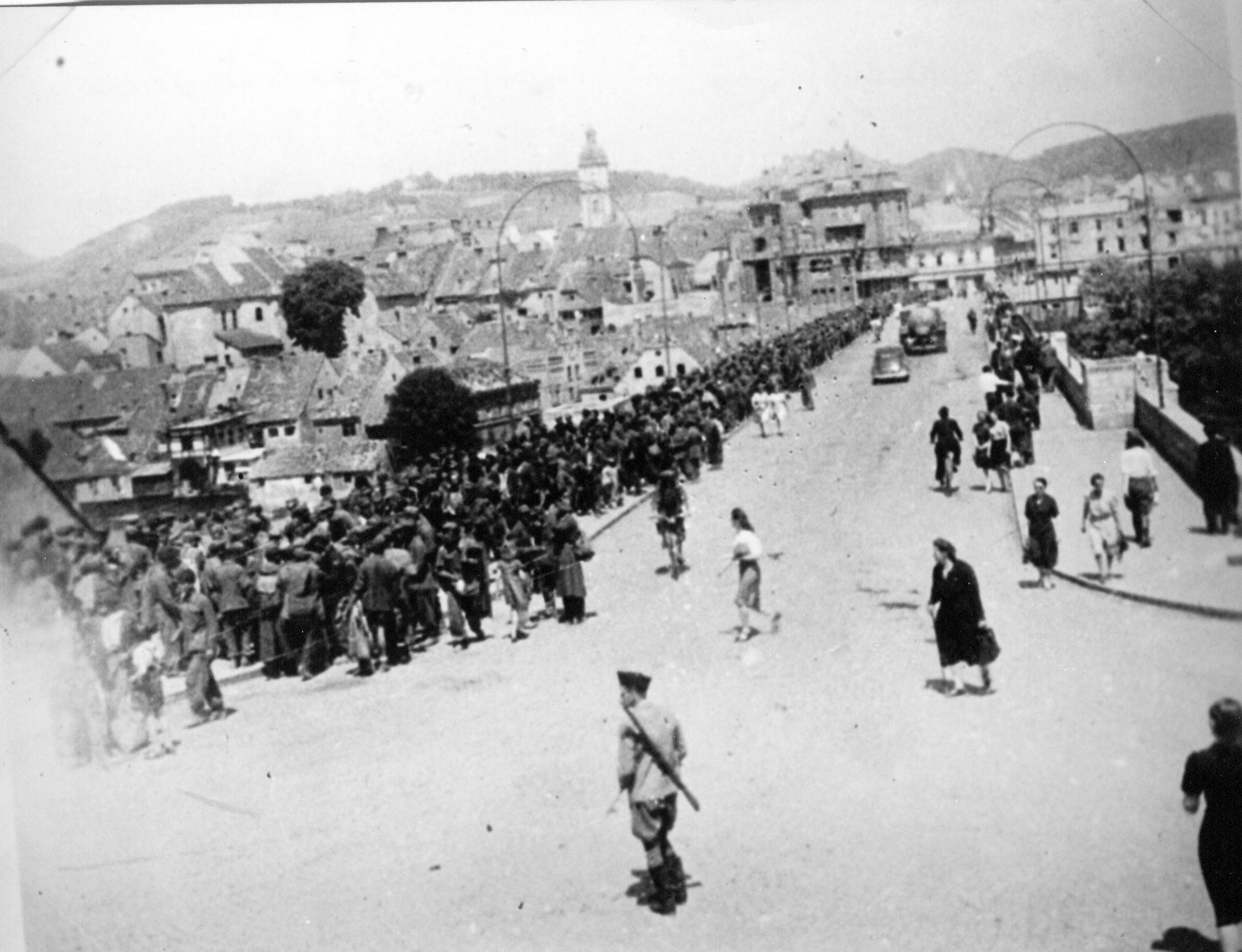
Prisoners of war in Maribor

The captured columns were subjected to forced marches from the border area in northern Slovenia. A large number of prisoners marched towards the town of Maribor, where transit camps were set. The transit centres were located in a military barracks in the Studenci District, an aircraft parts factory in Tezno and several smaller buildings.

As the columns moved away from the border with Austria, the prisoners were stripped of any valuables and given no food or water. To get to the destination more quickly, those who lagged behind were shot. Some were killed for taking a break or for being too tired to continue walking. In the course of the march, small groups of men were being selected from the columns, led away into the forest and killed. These killings were well organized and the work of entire units of men. Soon the killings of small groups turned into massive scale executions.

The local Partisan headquarters that coordinated the columns was located in Maribor. Organized executions were generally not conducted without the authorization of OZNA (Department of National Security). On 19 May, the Commander of the 3rd Army, Kosta Nađ, ordered the Majevica Brigade of the 17th Division to move to Maribor and subordinate itself to the local OZNA Command.

At the transit camps a selection was made among the prisoners. Some were sent to Zagreb and Celje on forced marches or used as forced labour. Others were sent to Tezno near Maribor, where anti-tank trenches were located that were dug by the Germans during the war. Their length was several kilometers and stretched from the Drava River to the slopes of Pohorje Mountains. Prisoners were taken to the trenches by trucks from the transit sites. Their hands were tied behind their backs with wires and many were stripped of their clothes. Upon arrival, they were lined up on the edge of the trenches and shot. A former Partisan who witnessed the killings gave a description of one of them:

[...]prisoners were lined up at the edge of the hole where the older corpses lay. Next they were looted of what belongings they had. Finally, the hundred prisoners were machine-gunned. I watched this slaughter from a distance of one hundred yards or less. Some of the prisoners threw themselves down flat and escaped the machine gun fire. They pretended to be dead, but the Partisans went from one apparent corpse to another and ran their bayonets through everyone whom they suspected of being alive. Screams rent the air, providing grim evidence that those who had dodged the machine gun fire had not eluded death for long. All of the new victims were thrown into the hole on top of the old corpses. Then the Partisans directed several more bursts of machine gun fire into the pile of bodies, just to make sure that they had not left anyone alive.

The executions started on 19 May. Partisan units that conducted them were the Majevica Brigade, 1st, 2nd, and parts of 3rd Battalion of the 6th Eastern Bosnian Brigade, which were all part of the 17th Eastern Bosnian Division of the 3rd Army. The killings lasted continuously for several days and were delayed only in the case if trucks with prisoners were late. When the trenches were full, special squads were ordered to cover them with soil. Some bodies were dug in separate mass graves or craters. The last murders were carried out on 26 May.

== Aftermath ==
The corpses were shallowly buried and in the following weeks and months additional conceals were made. The OZNA made a list of all mass grave sites in Slovenia. Together with the People's Defence Corps of Yugoslavia (KNOJ) they organized covering of the sites with land and plants. Local authorities were informed to prevent any mourning at the graves. Yugoslav authorities kept them secret; for decades, only limited access was allowed to the area. In 1984, it was designated by the government as a location of military cemeteries.

== Discovery and investigations of the graves ==
After the collapse of communism in Yugoslavia, hundreds of unmarked mass graves were found in Slovenia. The Tezno mass graves were found during the construction of a motorway near Maribor in 1999, when workers came upon an anti-tank trench that stretched several kilometres. It was estimated that the part intended for the motorway contained around 600 corpses.

Subsequent excavations revealed that there were 1,179 corpses in a 70 meter long part of the trench. On average there were 17 corpses found buried along each meter of it. The trench was covered with gravel and lime was found on top of the human remains. Most exhumed corpses indicated that the victims' arms were tied with wire. Individual skulls had visible gunshot wounds. In 1999, the Slovenian police initially estimated there were between 7,000 and 10,000 victims buried in the trenches.

A new exhumation began in 2007. The Commission on Concealed Mass Graves in Slovenia reported that their analysis and conducted probing of what is now a forested area in Tezno found human remains at a length of 940 meters. Based on mathematical calculations and comparisons with the excavations in 1999, it is estimated to contain the remains of around 15,000 victims. The collected documentation and preserved items of victims indicate that they were largely members of the HOS. The historian Mitja Ferenc notes that among the victims were also some members of the Montenegrin National Army, who were incorporated into the HOS that year, and probably a few members of Muslim militias, the German Army, and the Hungarian and Albanian battalions of the HOS (Hungarista legion and Skanderbeg legion). Jože Dežman, head of the Commission on Concealed Mass Graves, referred to Tezno as the largest mass grave in Europe following the end of World War II.

The part of the trench in Tezno in Maribor is officially designated the Tezno Woods 1 Mass Grave. The Tezno Woods 2–6 Mass Graves (Slovene: Grobišče Tezenski gozd 2–6) lie west of the settlement of Dogoše, between the Zlatoličje hydroelectric plant canal and Maribor, and are part of a former antitank trench.

== Commemoration ==
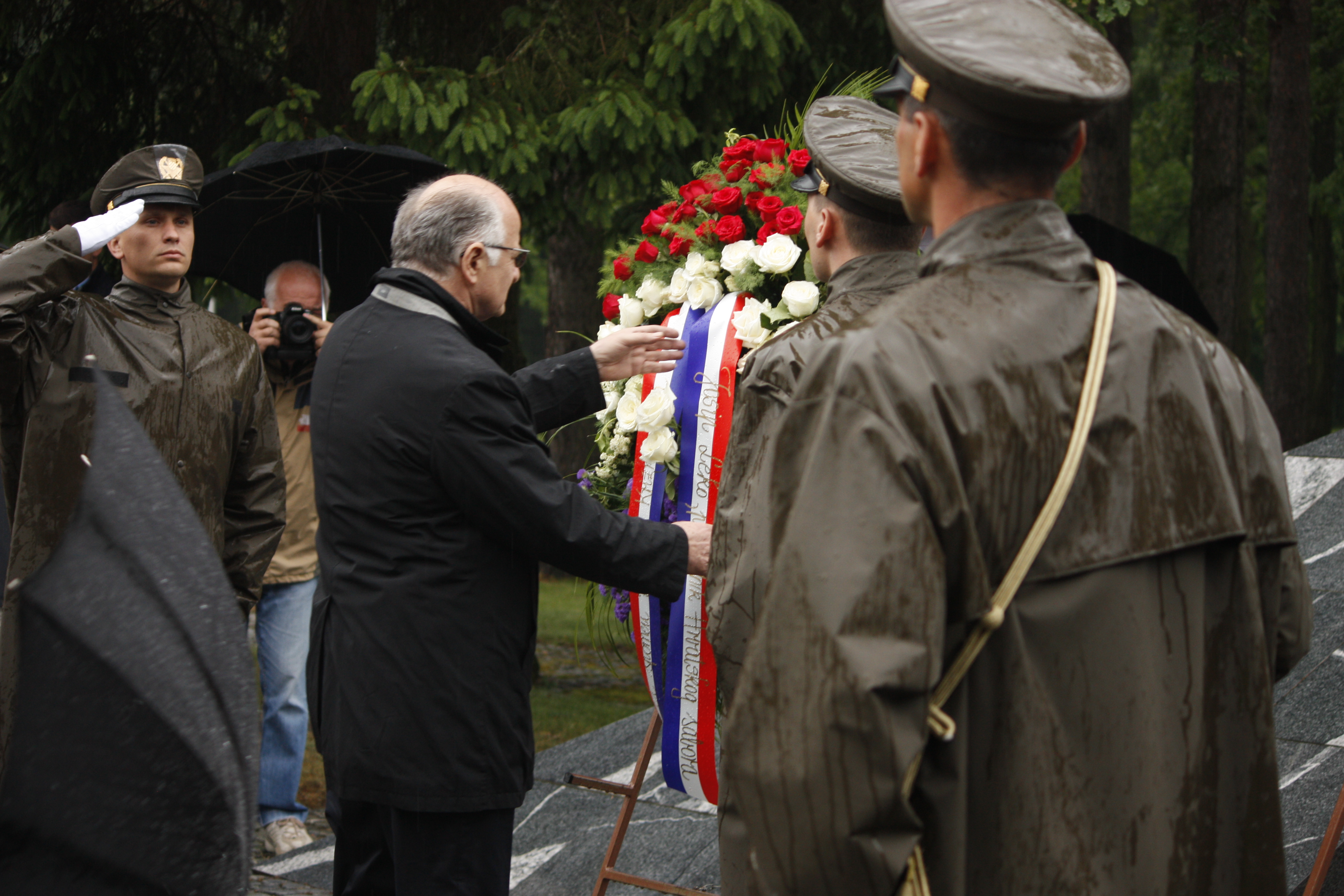
Josip Leko, speaker of the Croatian Parliament, lays a wreath at the memorial park in Tezno in May 2015

After the discovery of the graves, memorials were erected commemorating the deaths of the victims. In September 2007, the Slovene government started plans to make the mass grave site in Tezno a memorial park and a cemetery. Croatian president Ivo Josipović visited the site in June 2010 and laid wreaths for the victims.

In 2012, under Zoran Milanović's government, the Croatian Parliament decided to revoke funding for the annual Bleiburg commemoration and shifted to a smaller commemoration at the Tezno site. That year, President Josipović, Prime Minister Milanović and Speaker Boris Šprem, as well as Slovenian Prime Minister Janez Janša, visited the location and paid tribute to the victims.

At the opening of the memorial park in June 2012, the President of Slovenia, Danilo Türk, said:

The end of the Second World War also witnessed extra-judicial killings. And it was at Dobrava at Tezno that one of the major massacres took place. It is appropriate that these crimes are again decisively and clearly condemned today. On every suitable occasion, as the President of the Republic of Slovenia, I condemn all extra-judicial killings, and all forms of war and revolutionary violence. All those acts must be investigated and the whole truth must be told.

At the 2015 commemoration, the Croatian leadership condemned all crimes regardless of the ideology in whose name they were committed. After laying a wreath in Tezno, then-Prime Minister Milanović said:

I came here for the people who were killed at the end of a war. This is a tragic, horrible event which puts a stain on a just fight and one should not run from it, nor do I run from it. Places like this always cause uneasiness, but they must be accepted and heads must not be turned away from them.

== Tezno memorial park ==
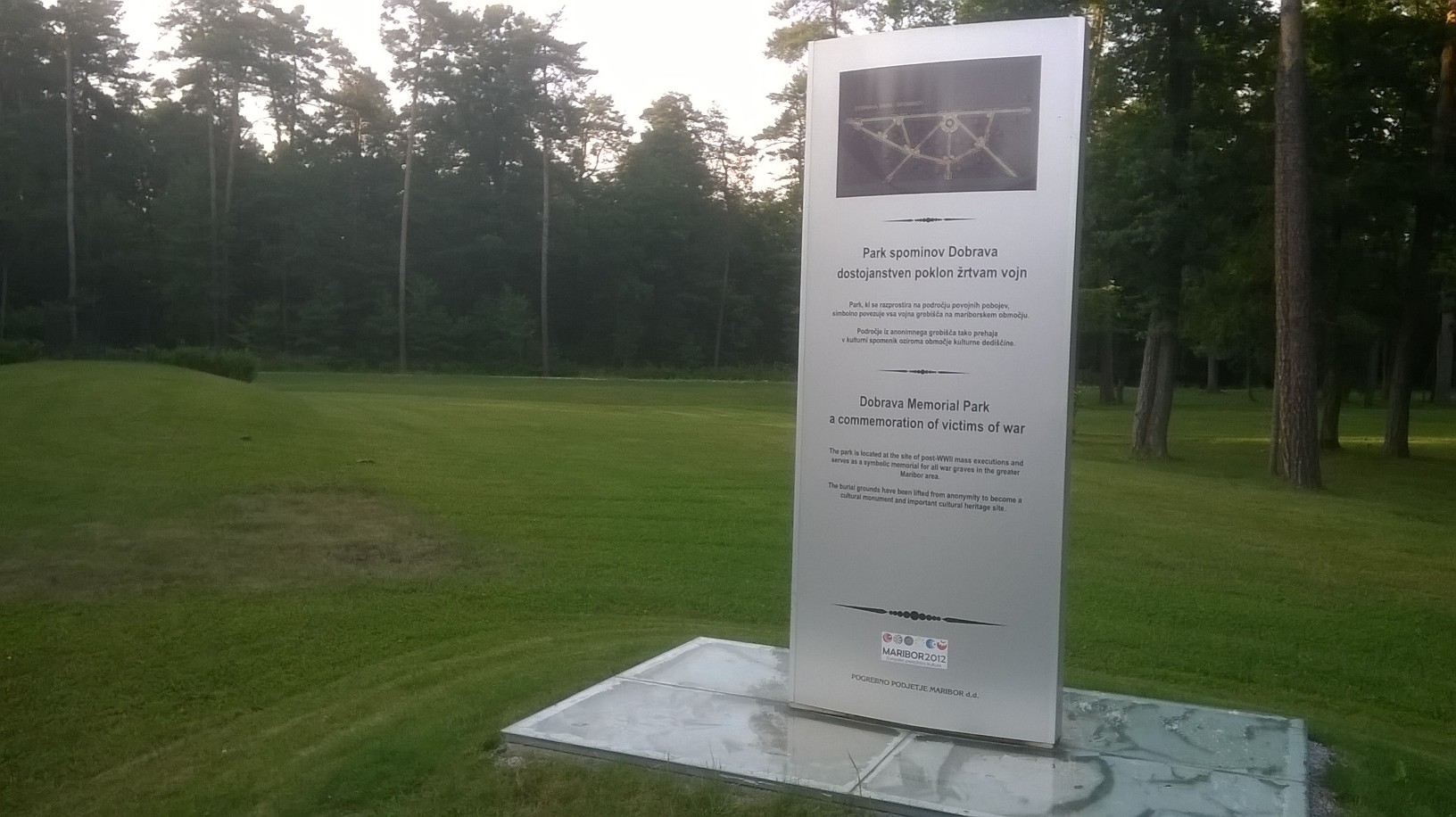

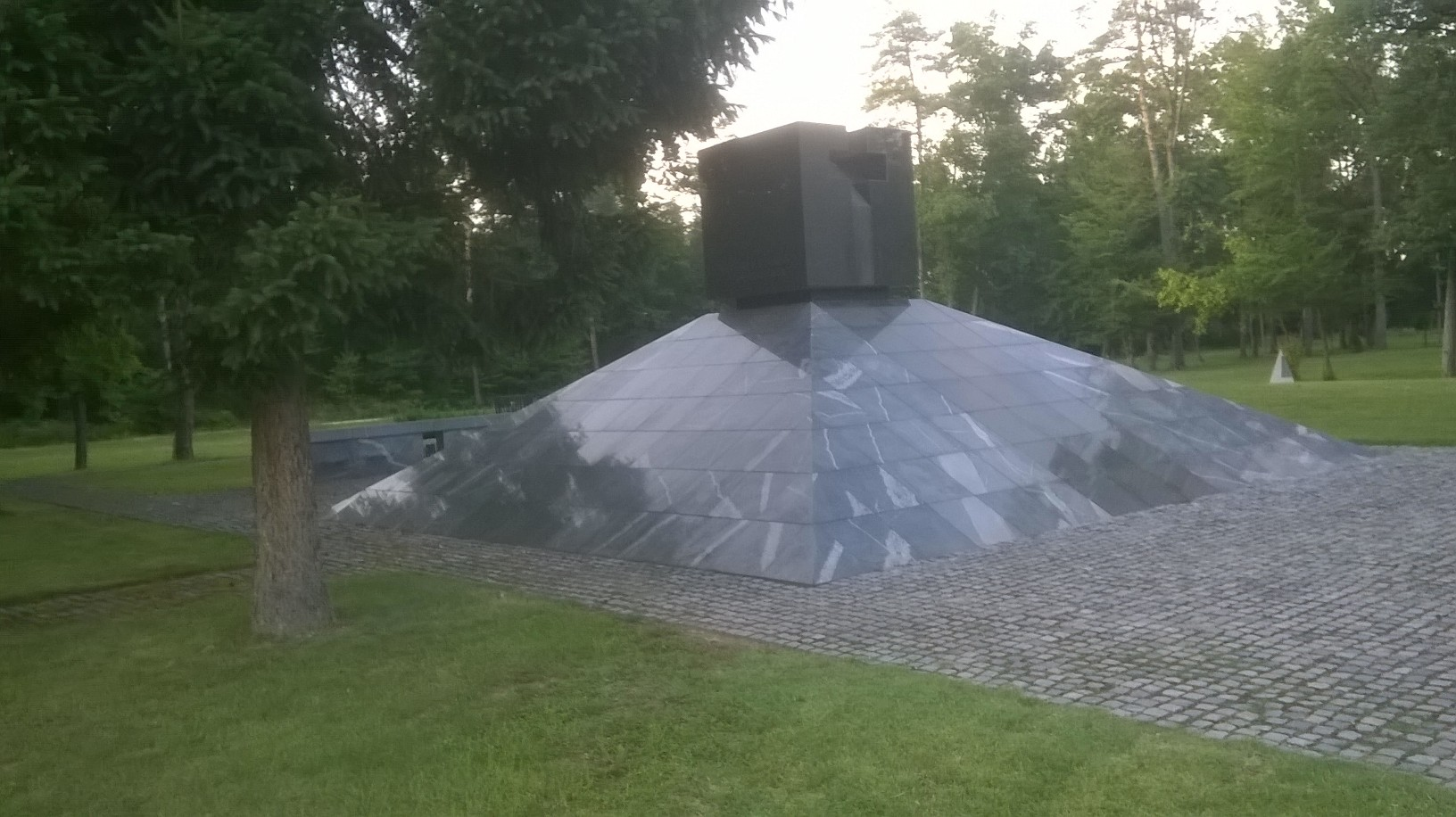

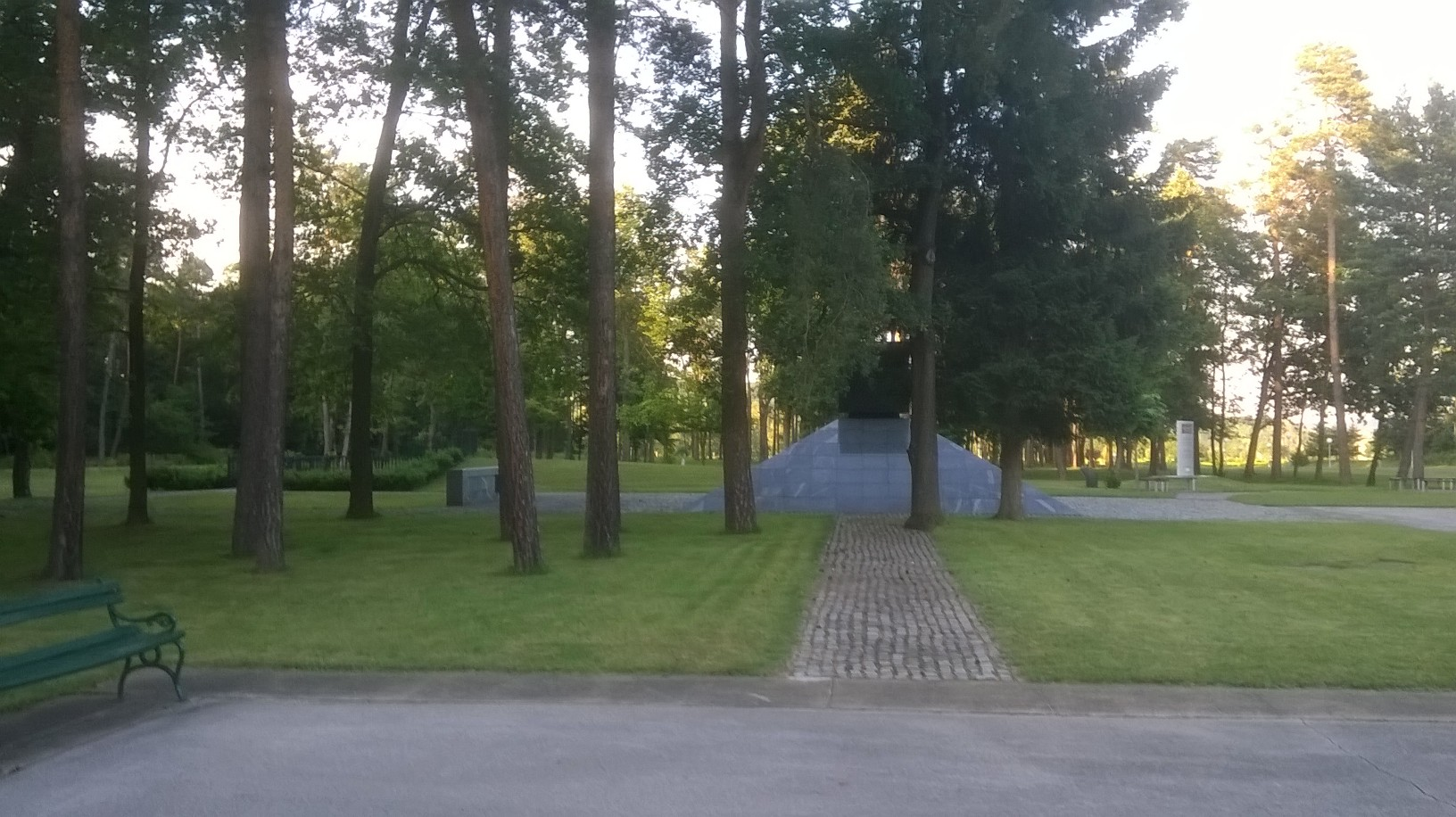

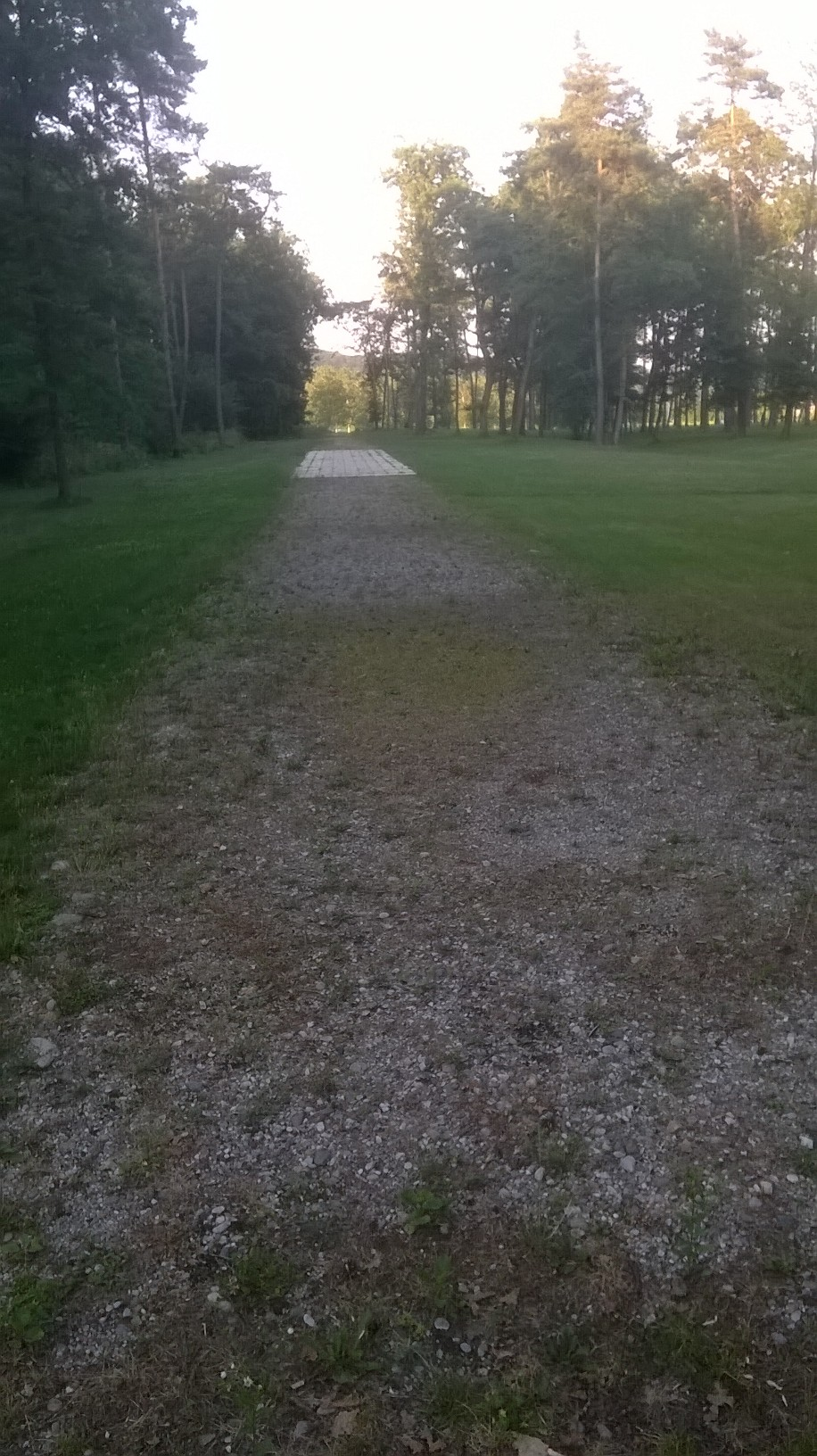

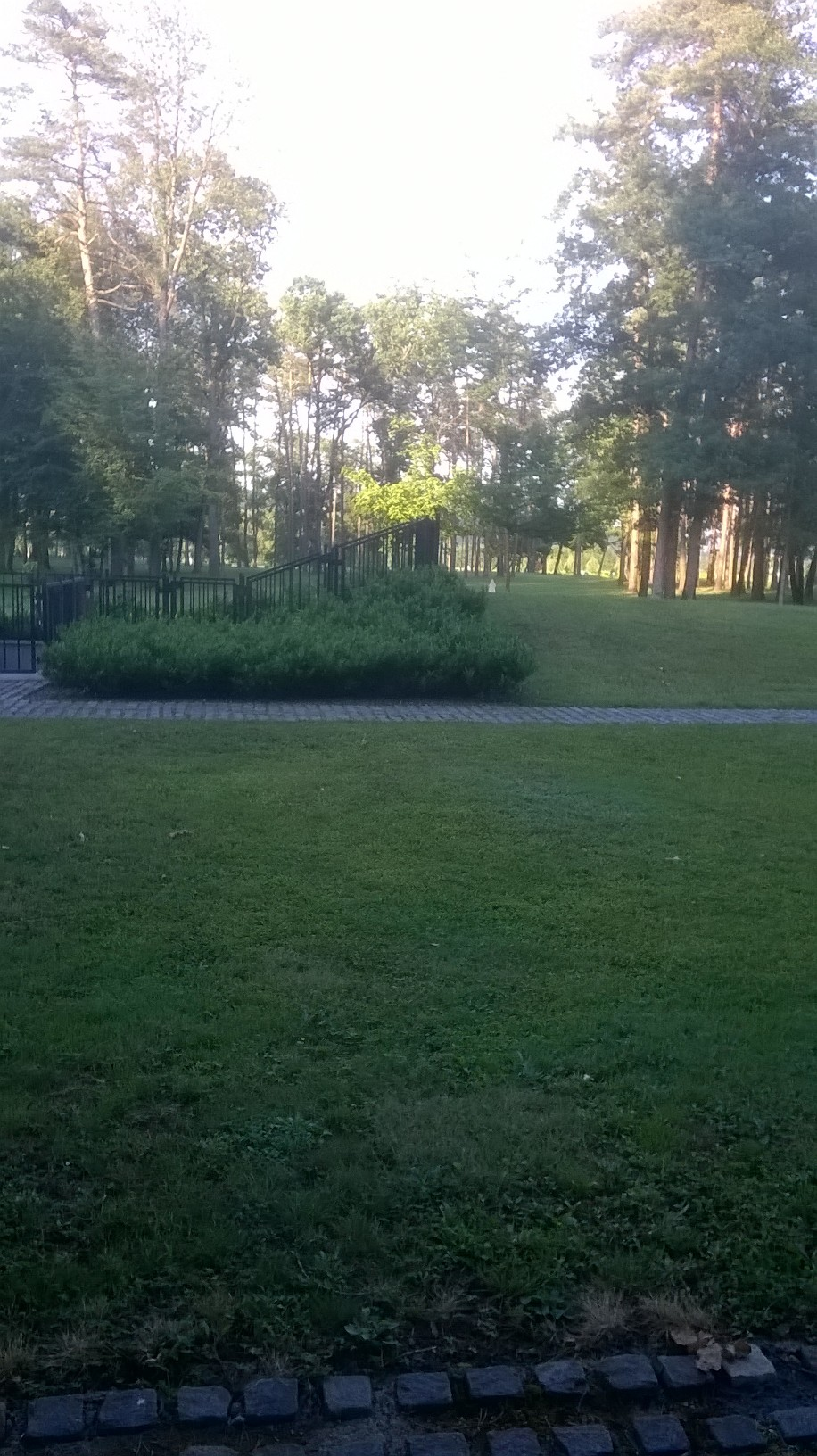

== See also ==
- Mass graves in Slovenia
- Mass graves in Maribor
- Mass killings under communist regimes
