= Stari Pisker =

Former prison in Celje, Slovenia

Coordinates: 46°13′46″N 15°15′47″E

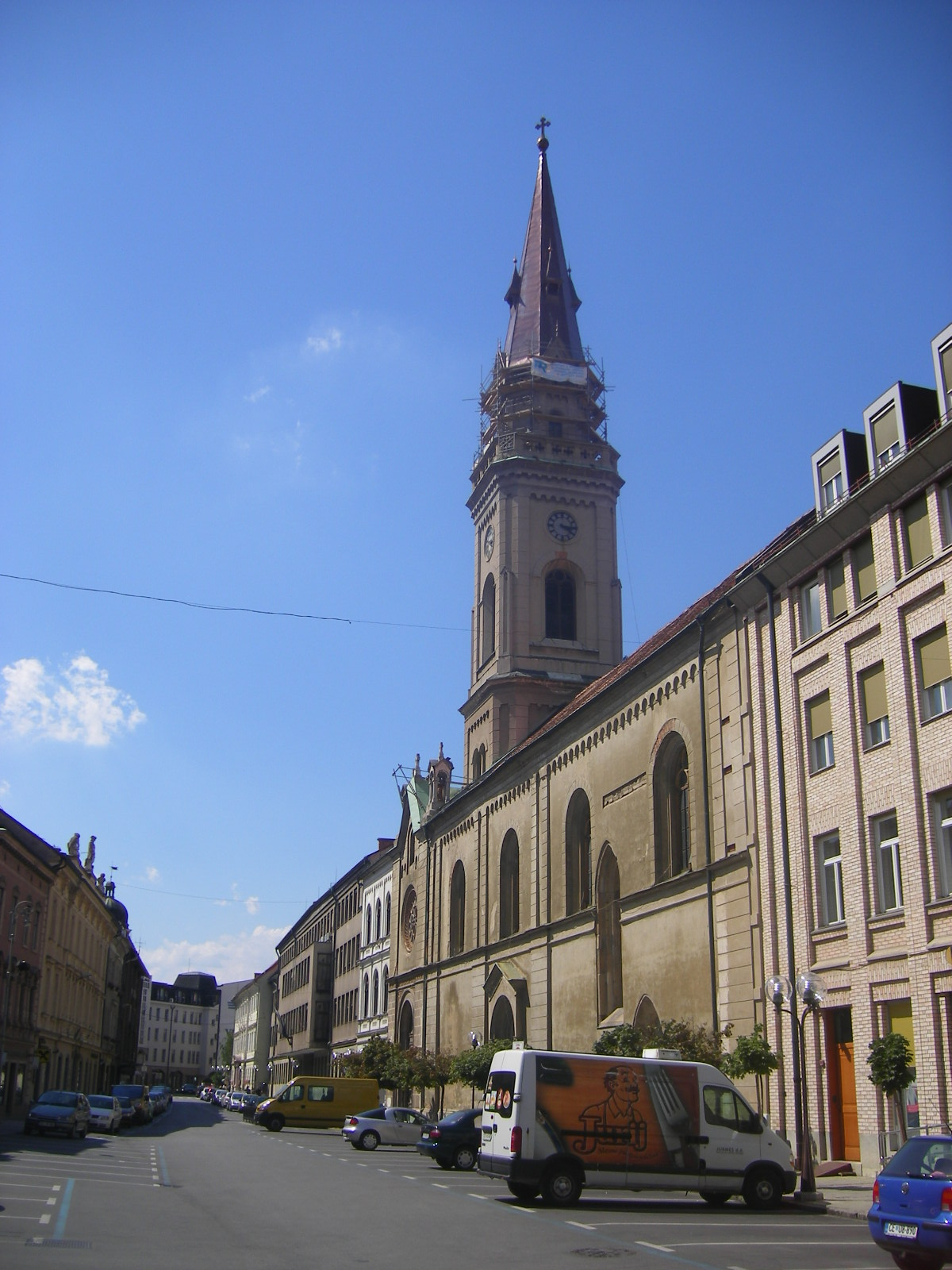
The Stari pisker Prison and the St. Mary's Church

Stari Pisker (meaning in colloquial Slovene: an old pot) is a former prison in Celje, Slovenia.

During World War II the German occupation forces committed many war crimes in the city and 374 hostages were executed at the Stari Pisker Prison in 1944. The prison once underwent an inspection by Heinrich Himmler.

In 1965 the prison was reopened as a memorial site, with a memorial room in what was once the torture chamber and the courtyard adapted for remembrance.

It underwent a renovation in 1995.
