= Mass graves in Škofja Loka =

Coordinates: 46°09′56″N 14°18′9″E

Mass graves in Škofja Loka were created in Škofja Loka, Slovenia during and after the Second World War. The Commission on Concealed Mass Graves in Slovenia has registered seven known mass graves in the city itself and an additional 20 in the Municipality of Škofja Loka.

== Background ==
The concealed mass graves in Škofja Loka were created in the immediate aftermath of the Second World War, after British forces forcibly repatriated Home Guard soldiers that had fled to Austria to Yugoslavia from camps in Bleiburg, Lavamund, Rosenbach, Viktring (a district of Klagenfurt), and elsewhere. They are part of the mass graves associated with the nearby former Loka Castle prison, where Home Guard members and civilians that did not flee to Austria were also killed en masse. The Skofja Loka prison has been characterized as an extermination camp that was also used for torture.

== List of mass graves ==
Škofja Loka is the site of seven known mass graves from the period immediately after the Second World War. Two additional mass graves connected with these are located in neighboring Vincarje. An unknown number of Home Guard prisoners of war and Slovene civilians, and possibly victims of other nationalities, were murdered and buried at several sites in and around Loka Castle.

- The Loka Castle Yard Mass Grave (Slovene: Grobišče na vrtu loškega gradu), also known as the Castle Dance Floor Mass Grave (Grobišče Plesišče pri gradu), is located in the castle park.
- The Castle Wall 1 Mass Grave (Slovene: Grobišče pri grajskem obzidju 1) is located in a meadow on a slope about 30 meters (98 ft) outside the wall of Loka Castle, in Vincarje. It contains the remains of an unknown number of Home Guard prisoners of war and Slovene civilians, and possibly victims of other nationalities.
- The Castle Wall 2–6 mass graves (Grobišče pri grajskem obzidju 2–6) are located around the castle perimeter. Grave number two lies in a meadow by the southwest corner of the castle wall and the remains of five victims were discovered at the site in December 2006. The third grave lies on the inside of the southwest corner of the wall. The fourth grave is in a meadow next to the tree-lined boulevard. The fifth grave is on the left side of the path next to the wall. The sixth grave is to the right, below the path.
- The Viršk Field Mass Grave (Grobišče Virško polje) is located on the southern edge of the town, between the Poljane Sora River and the road to Gorenja Vas, near two bunkers. It contained the remains of an unknown number of German prisoners of war. It is believed that the remains were disinterred after the war.
- The Bear Valley Mass Grave (Grobišče v Medvedovi dolini), also known as the Ski Valley Mass Grave (Grobišče Smučarska dolina), lies in the Bear Valley Sinkhole (Medvedova dolina) in Vincarje, about 500 meters (1,600 ft) southwest of Loka Castle and 200 meters (660 ft) east of the castle wall. It contains the remains of 20 German prisoners of war that died or were murdered in the summer of 1945. The remains may have been exhumed.
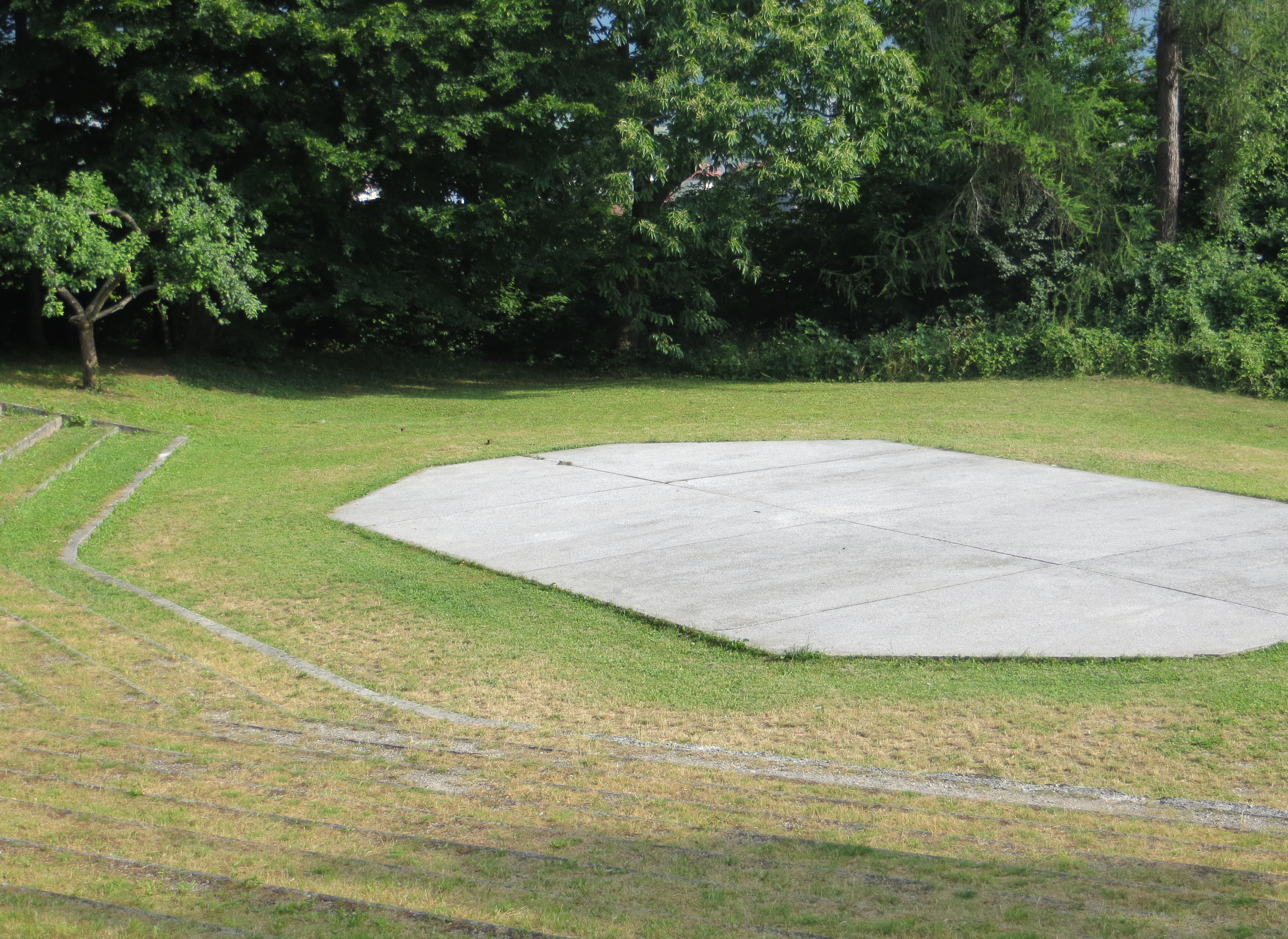
Loka Castle Yard Mass Grave

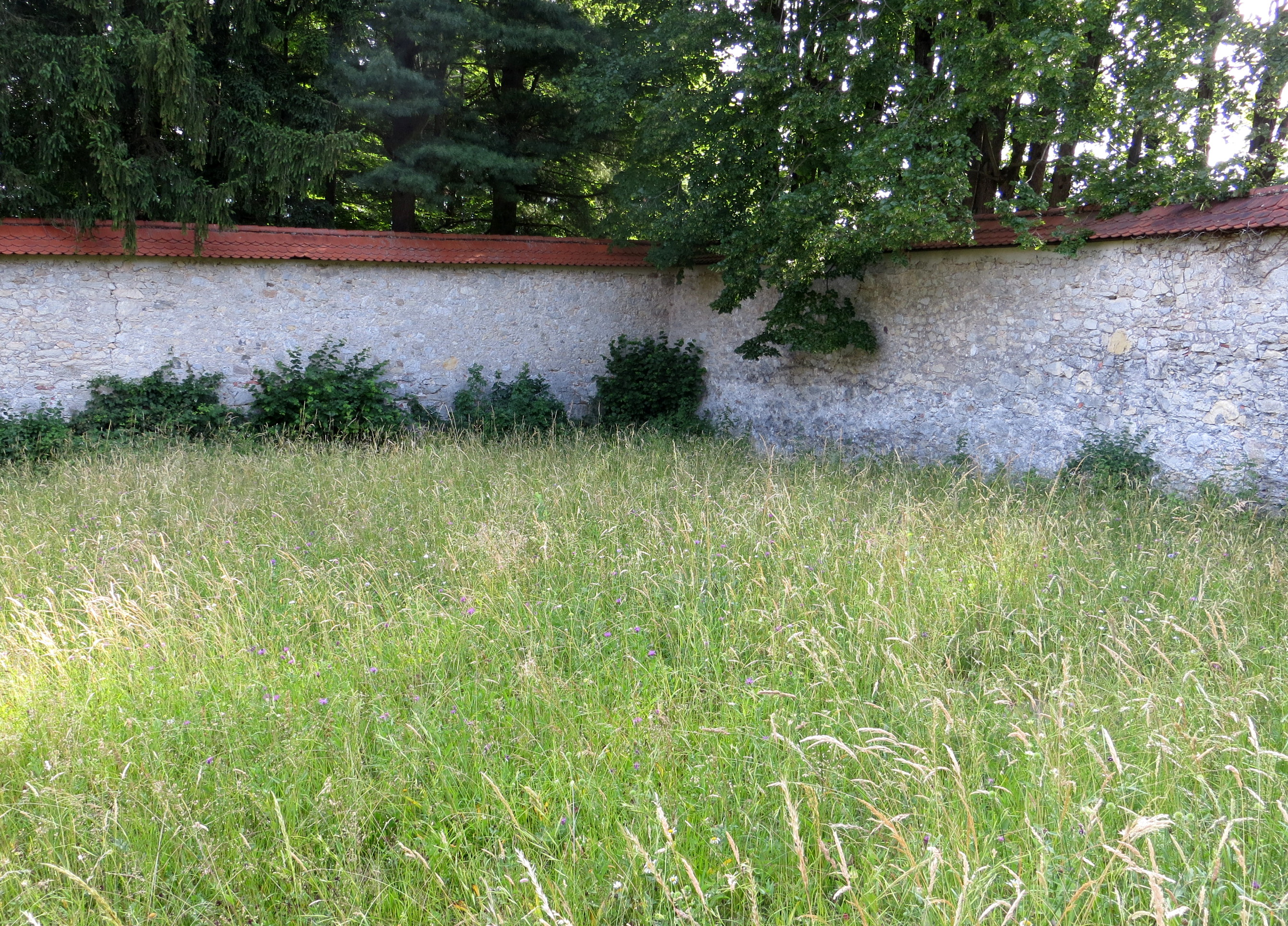
Castle Wall 2 Mass Grave

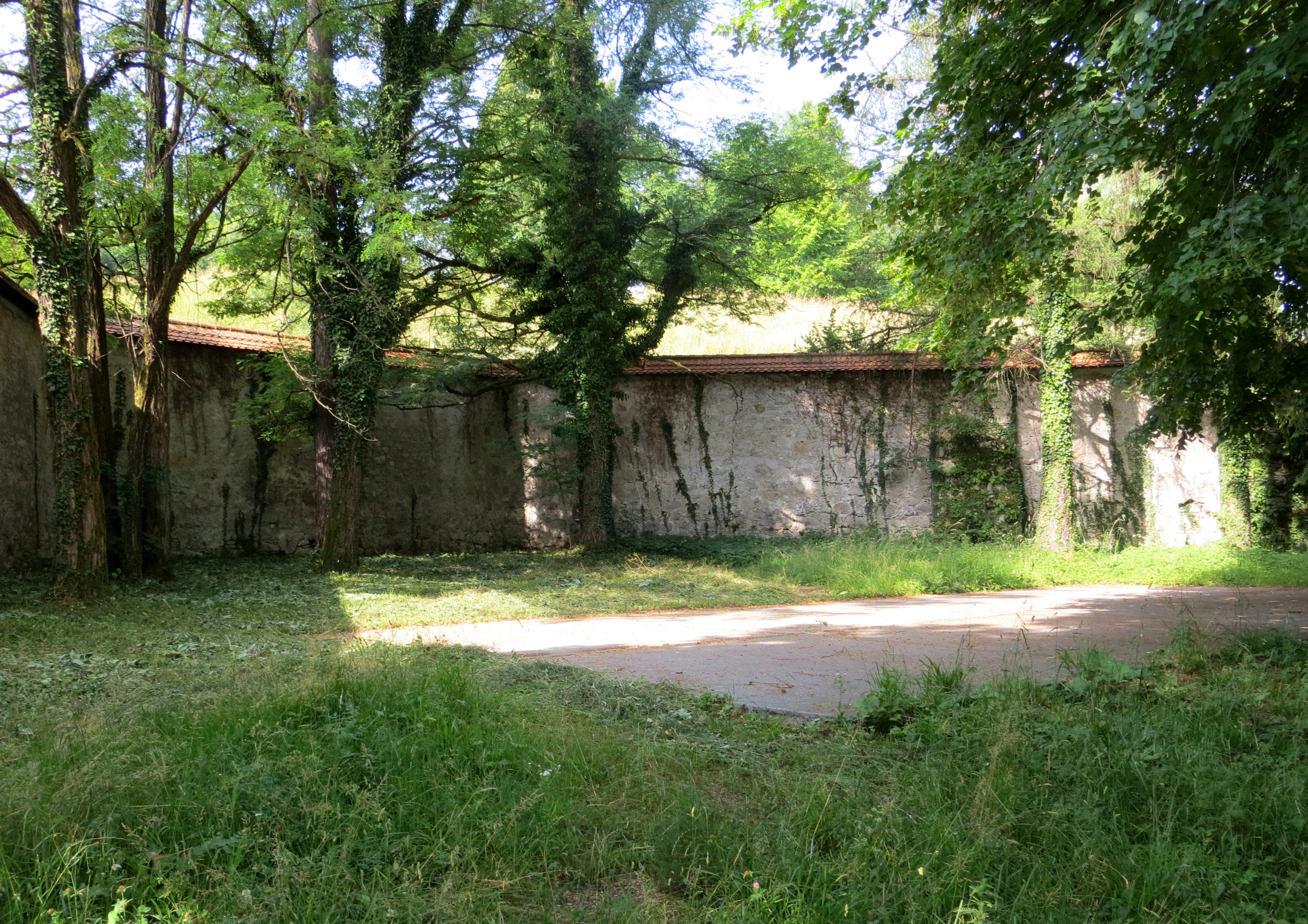
Castle Wall 3 Mass Grave

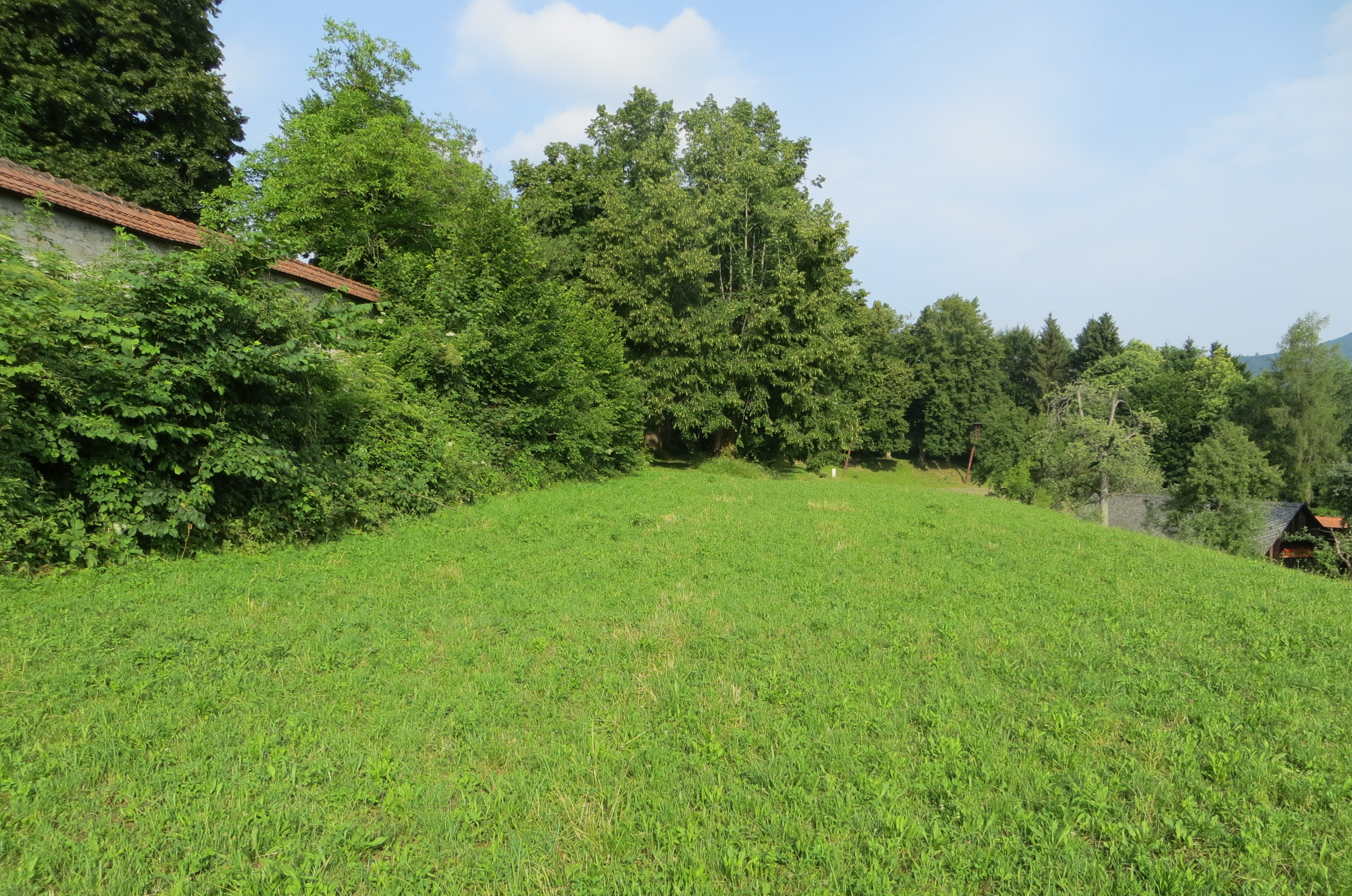
Castle Wall 4 Mass Grave

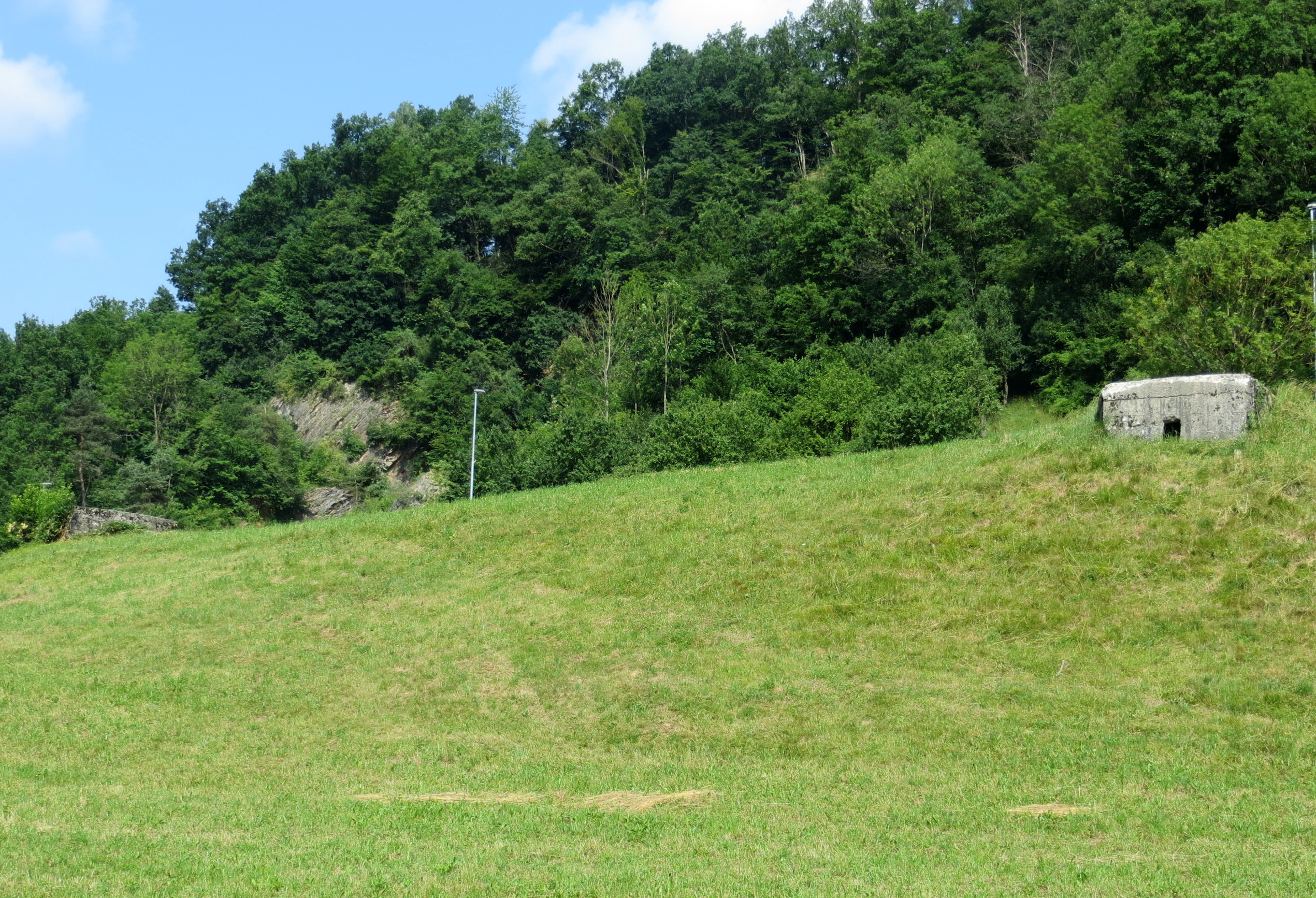
Viršk Field Mass Grave

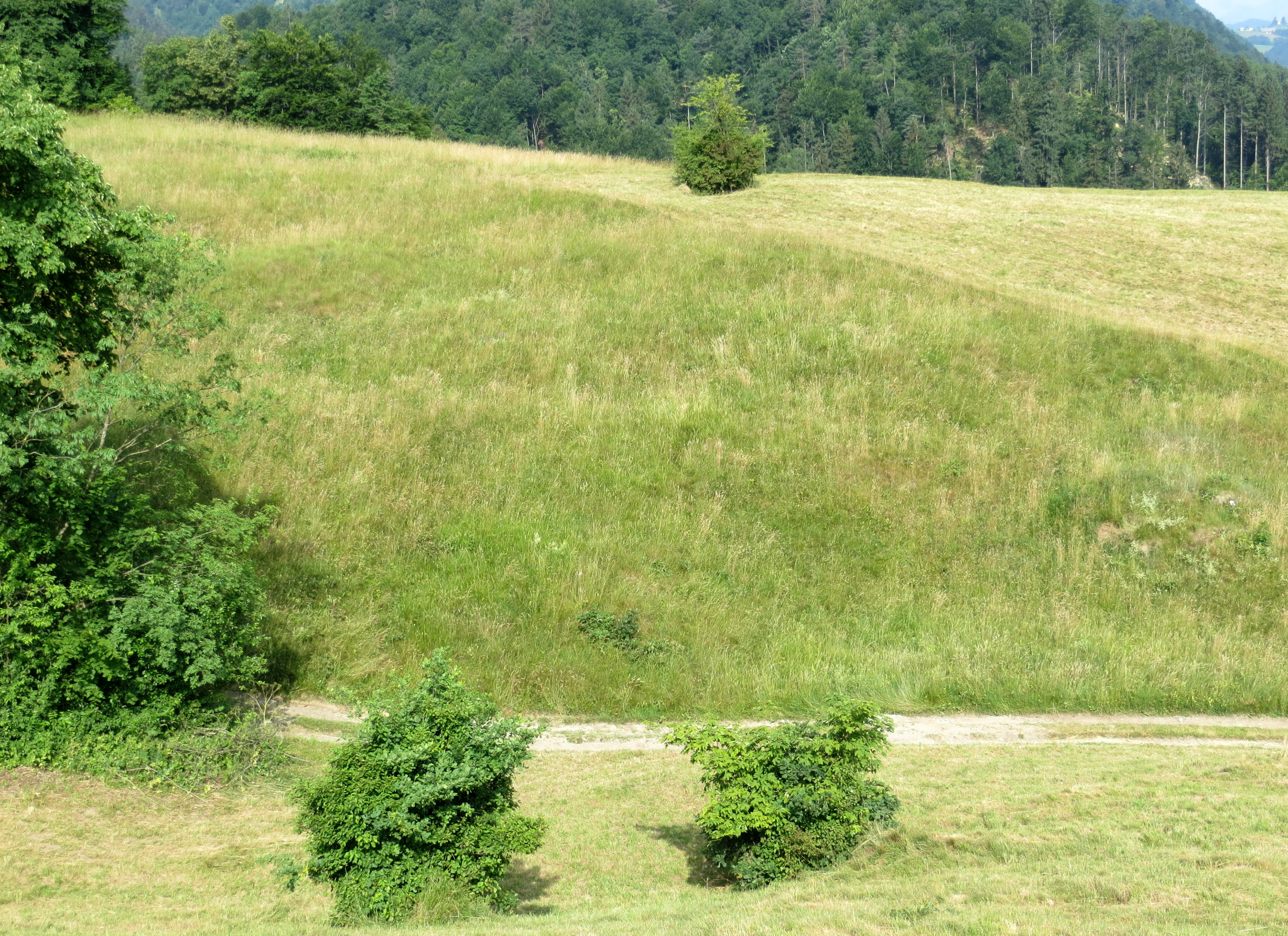
Bear Valley Mass Grave, Vincarje

== Other mass graves ==
Additional mass graves in the Municipality of Škofja Loka are located in Bodovlje, Breznica pod Lubnikom, Crngrob, Dobruška Vas, Gabrovo, Križna Gora, Pevno, Puštal, Sopotnica, Trnje, and Vešter.
