= Vešter =

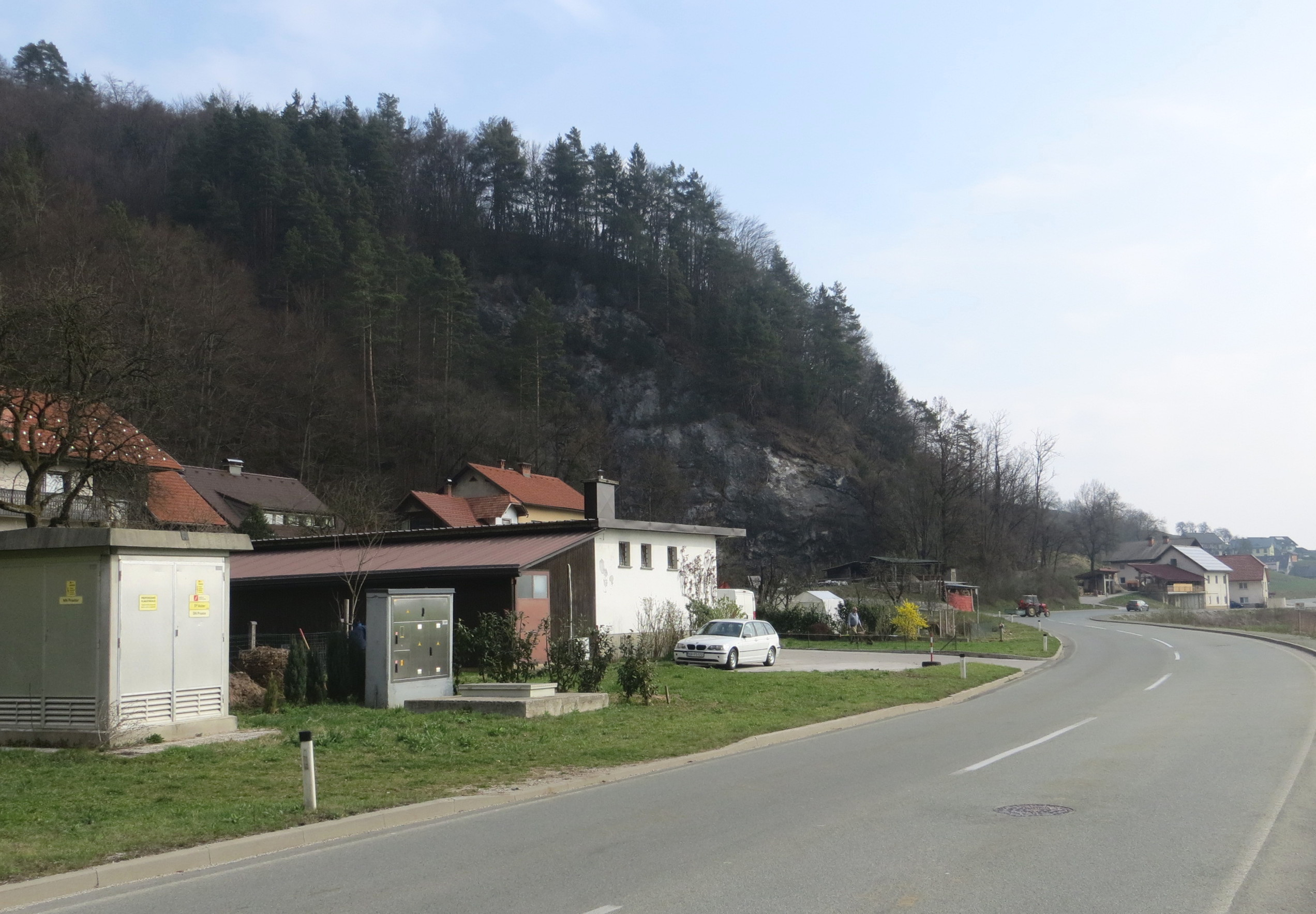

- Location in Slovenia
- Coordinates: 46°10′31.17″N 14°17′23.48″E
- Country: Slovenia
- Traditional region: Upper Carniola
- Statistical region: Upper Carniola
- Municipality: Škofja Loka

Area
  - Total: 2.37 km^{2} (0.92 sq mi)
- Elevation: 372.1 m (1,221 ft)

Population (2002)
  - Total: 178

Vešter (pronounced [ˈʋeːʃtəɾ]; in older sources also Bešter, German: Westert) is a settlement in the Municipality of Škofja Loka in the Upper Carniola region of Slovenia.

== Geography ==
Vešter is an old clustered village east of Trnje along the road from Škofja Loka to Železniki. It stands on the left bank of the Selca Sora River with the settled area in the Vešter Plain (Slovene: Veštrsko polje), and Puštal Hill and Cavrn Hill rise north of the settlement.

== Name ==
Vešter was attested in historical sources as Obernwester in 1291, Westreden in 1421, Westert in 1481, and Bestrad in 1500. The name Vešter is shortened from German Obernwester (literally, 'upper Vešter'). The neighboring village of Trnje was formerly called Wester, and so the epithet distinguished the two villages. The name Vešter is derived from the microtoponym Westerfeld ('western field', today Veštrsko polje), which stands west of the cluster of villages around Stara Loka; the corresponding Osterfeld ('eastern field', now the northern part of Škofja Loka) stood east of the built-up area, and there was also a Mittelfeld 'middle field' between the two.

== History ==
There is an unexcavated hillfort on Puštal Hill, testifying to prehistoric settlement in the area. In the 13th century, Vešter belonged to the Gadmar District (German: Gadnerambt).

During the Second World War, the Partisans used the Vešter Mill (Veštrski mlin) south of the village, a structure attested since the 13th century, as an underground printshop. The building was burned by German forces on February 8, 1944, killing three Partisans. There is a memorial at the site.

=== Mass graves ===
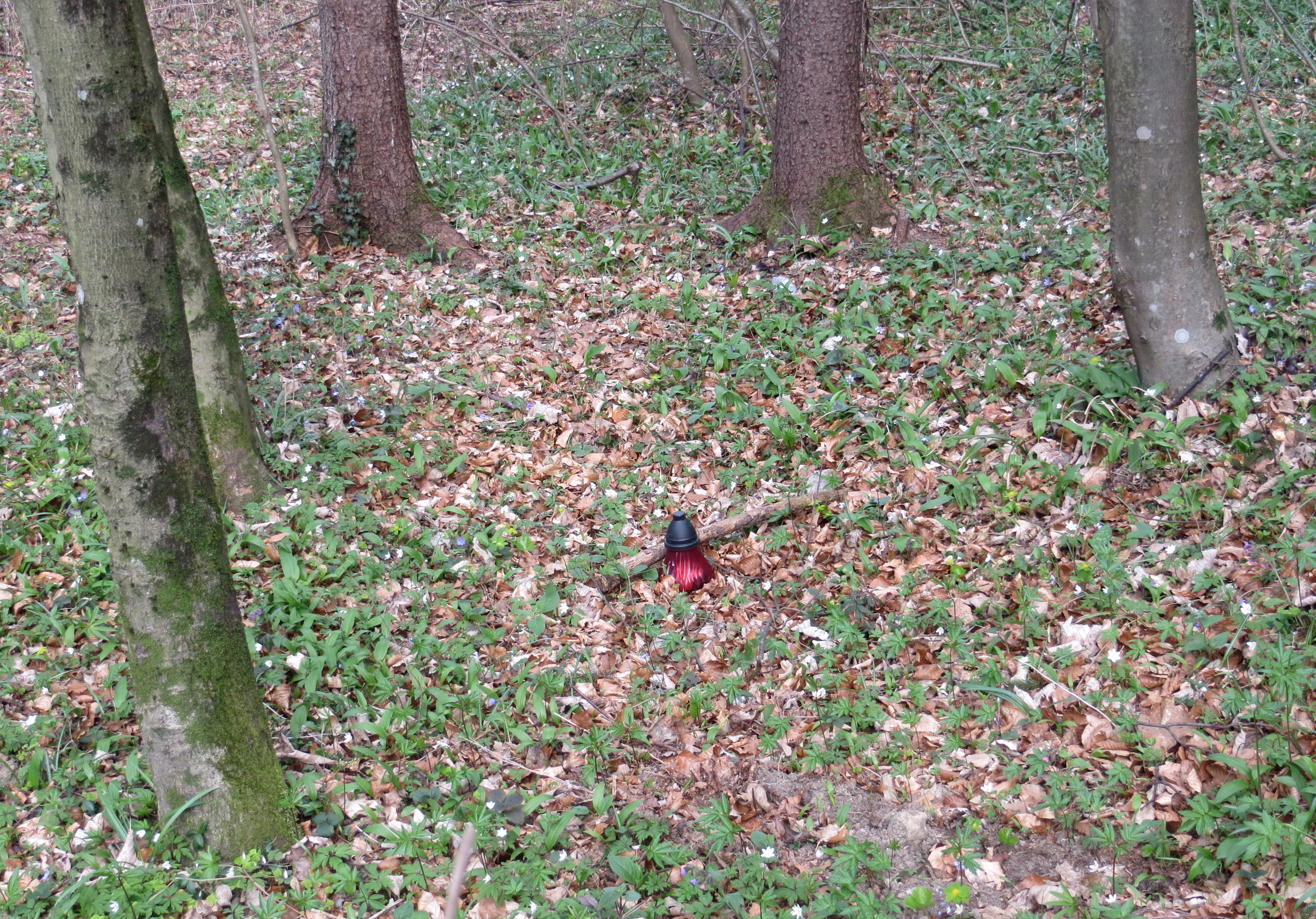
Gorge Mass Grave

Vešter is the site of three known mass graves from the period immediately after World War II. The Gorge Mass Grave (Slovene: Grobišče Soteska) is located in the narrowest part of the Selca Sora Valley along the road from Škofja Loka to Železniki, about 10 meters (33 ft) east of the road. It contains the remains of six to 10 Home Guard soldiers and civilians that were released from the Škofja Loka Castle prison and then intercepted and murdered on their way home. The Lovrec House Mass Grave (Grobišče Lovrčeva hiša), also known as the Matjaž Valley Mass Grave (Grobišče Matjaževa dolina), lies below the foot of Cavrn Hill, along a path about 600 meters (2,000 ft) northwest of the village of Trnje. It contains the remains of eight Home Guard soldiers that were taken from the Škofja Loka Castle prison and murdered. The abandoned and dilapidated Lovrec House (Lovrčeva hiša) stood at the site in 1945. The Cavrn Mass Grave (Grobišče Cavrn) is located on the slope of Cavrn Hill near a former Partisan bunker. It contains the remains of eight Home Guard soldiers that were taken from the Škofja Loka Castle prison and murdered.
