= Gabrovo, Škofja Loka =

Gabrovo
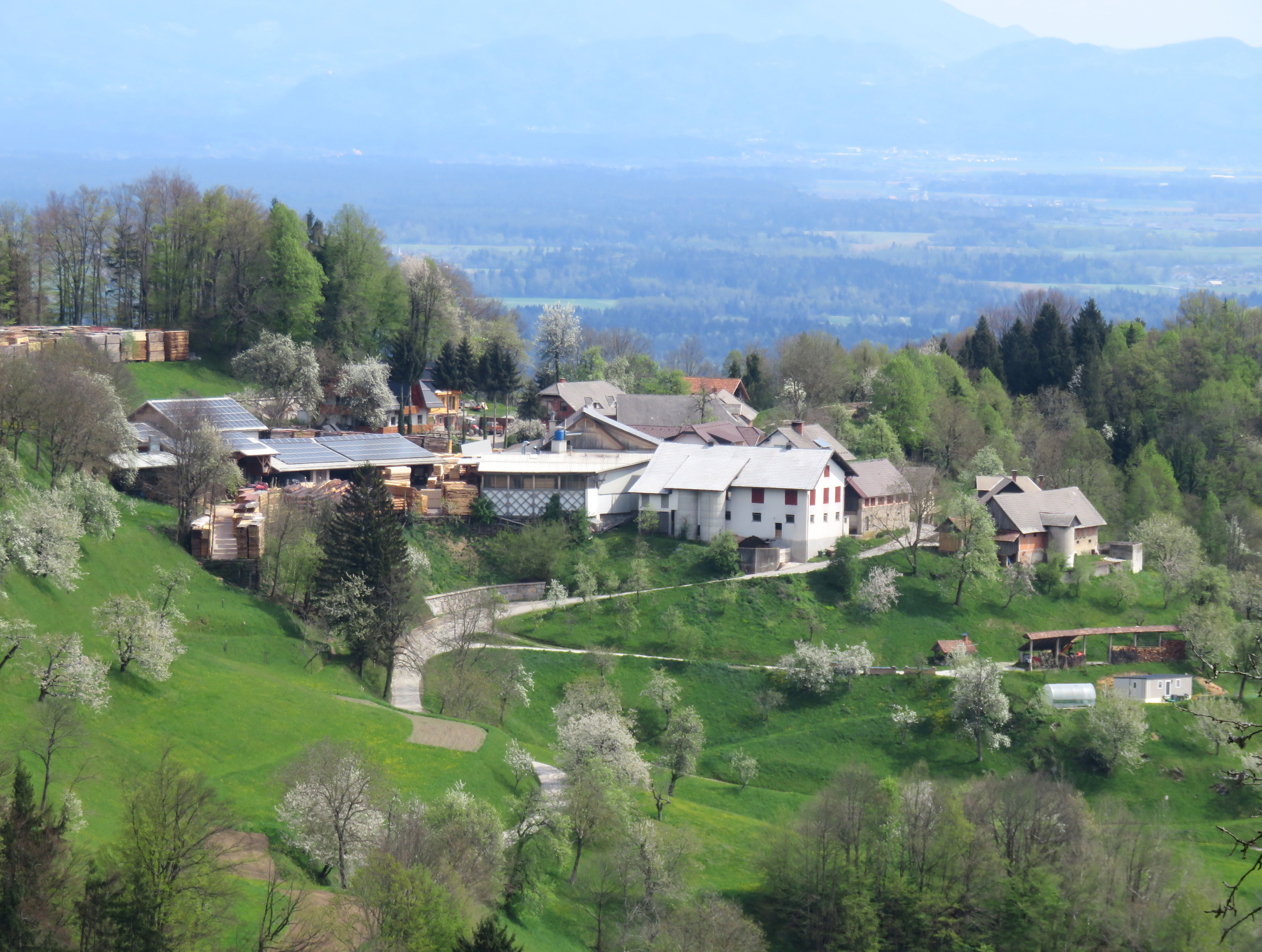

- Location in Slovenia
- Coordinates: 46°9′37.45″N 14°16′39.42″E
- Country: Slovenia
- Traditional region: Upper Carniola
- Statistical region: Upper Carniola
- Municipality: Škofja Loka

Area
  - Total: 2.37 km^{2} (0.92 sq mi)
- Elevation: 630.4 m (2,068 ft)

Population (2002)
  - Total: 28

Gabrovo (pronounced [ˈɡaːbɾɔʋɔ]; German: Gabrou) is a small village in the Municipality of Škofja Loka in the Upper Carniola region of Slovenia.

== Geography ==
Gabrovo is a clustered village on a sunny terrace below Little Mount Lubnik (Mali Lubnik, elevation: 820 meters or 2,690 feet). Hiking trails connect the village to Vincarje and Škofja Loka to the east, and to Mount Lubnik (elevation: 1,025 meters or 3,363 feet) to the northwest. The Rant Shaft (Ranotovo brezno) lies directly north of the village, and Lubnik Cave (Lubniška jama) and Kevdrc Cave lie to the northwest.

== History ==
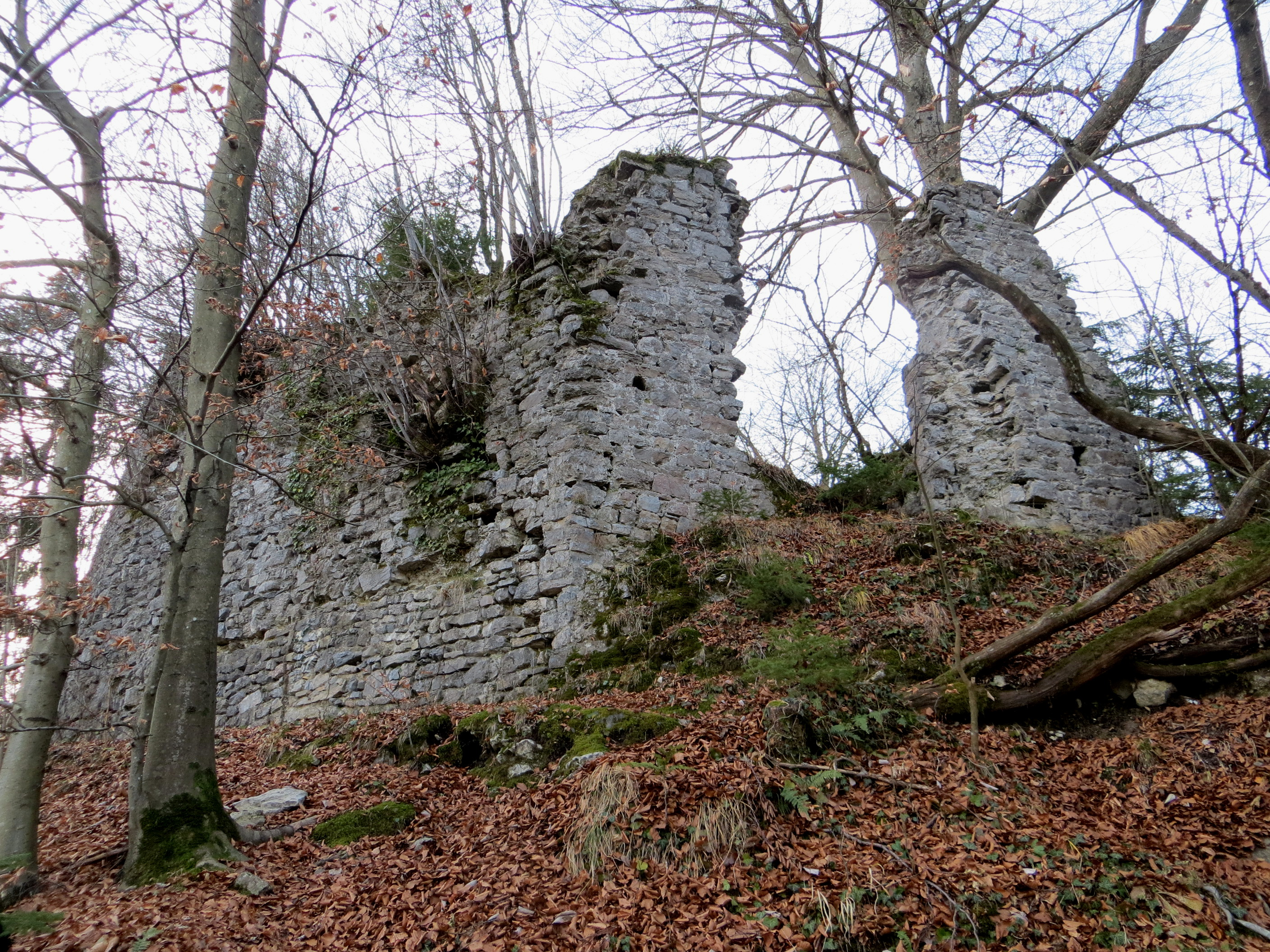
Ruins of Wildenlack Castle

The ruins of the oldest castle in the Skofja Loka region stand just east of Gabrovo at an elevation called Stari grad 'old castle' (502 meters or 1,647 feet). The castle, originally named Wildenlack, dates back to the 12th or 13th century and was first mentioned in written sources in the 14th century. The remnants of the surrounding Romanesque wall and the foundations of other structures are visible at the site.

A water main to Gabrovo was installed in 1895; the catchment stands below Mount Lubnik.

=== Mass graves ===
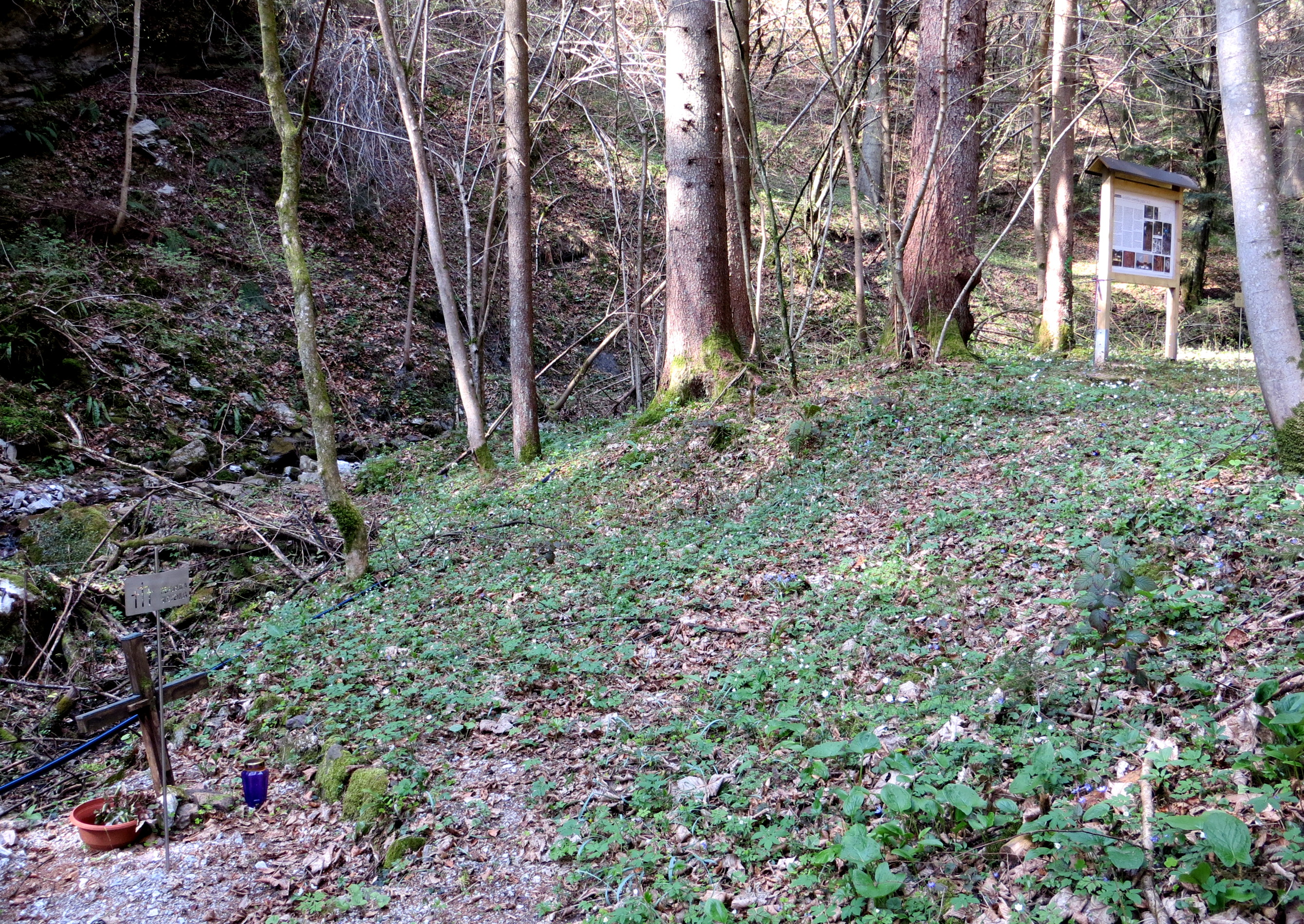
The Lovrenc Ravine mass graves

Gabrovo is the site of two known mass graves from the end of the Second World War. The Lovrenc Ravine 1 and 2 mass graves (Slovene: Grobišče Lovrenška grapa 1, 2) are located south of the settlement, between a path and Zaplotnica Creek. The two locations are about 20 meters (66 ft) apart. Grave one contains the remains of seven German prisoners of war that were forced to bury the victims in grave two. Grave two contains the remains of 20 Home Guard soldiers from the prison at Loka Castle.

== Notable people ==
Notable people that were born or lived in Gabrovo include:

- Janez Volčič (1825–1887), religious writer
