= Vincarje =

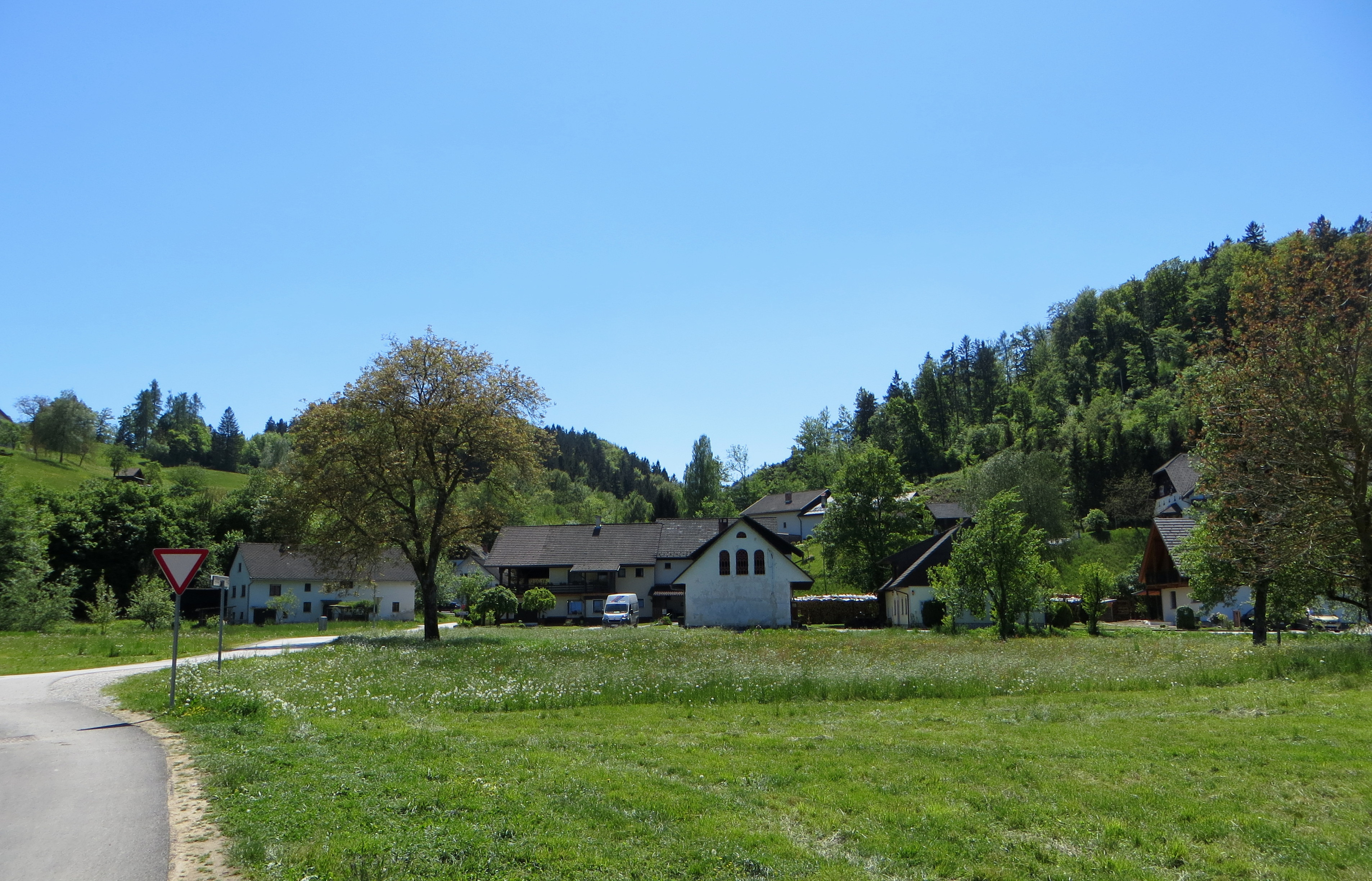

- Location in Slovenia
- Coordinates: 46°10′4.81″N 14°17′55.99″E
- Country: Slovenia
- Traditional region: Upper Carniola
- Statistical region: Upper Carniola
- Municipality: Škofja Loka

Area
  - Total: 4.05 km^{2} (1.56 sq mi)
- Elevation: 356.2 m (1,169 ft)

Population (2002)
  - Total: 162

Vincarje (pronounced [ˈʋiːntsaɾjɛ]) is a settlement in the Municipality of Škofja Loka in the Upper Carniola region of Slovenia.

== Geology ==
There are many sinkholes in the area, including the Bear Valley Sinkhole (Slovene: Medvedova dolina), Gips Cave (Gipsova jama), Mary's Shaft (Marijino brezno), and Migut Shaft (Migutovo brezno) near the Grebenar farm. There is also a spring south of the settlement known as Blessed Spring (Slovene: Žegnani studenec).

== Name ==
Vincarje was first attested in written sources in 1291 as Weinzůrl (and as Weinzurl in 1318 and Weintzurl in 1500). The name (now a feminine plural) is originally a masculine accusative plural of the common noun vincar 'day laborer in a vineyard', borrowed from Middle High German winzer. In the Middle Ages, the people of Vincarje worked as day laborers in vineyards belonging to the Bishops of Freising in Škofja Loka. Locally, the village is also called Vencarje.

== History ==
The ruins of Wildenlack Castle, also known locally as Old Castle (Slovene: Stari grad), lie above the settlement in the neighboring village of Gabrovo. The castle was destroyed in the 1511 Idrija earthquake and never rebuilt. In 1873 public baths were established at the Anka Mansion (vila Anka) in the settlement, featuring wooden tubs and a stove for heating the water. The Lubnik Lodge (Slovene: Planinski dom na Lubniku) was built before the Second World War. It was burned during the war and rebuilt in 1953. A plaque on the lodge commemorates two hikers that were shot by German forces on Mount Lubnik in 1941.

=== Mass graves ===
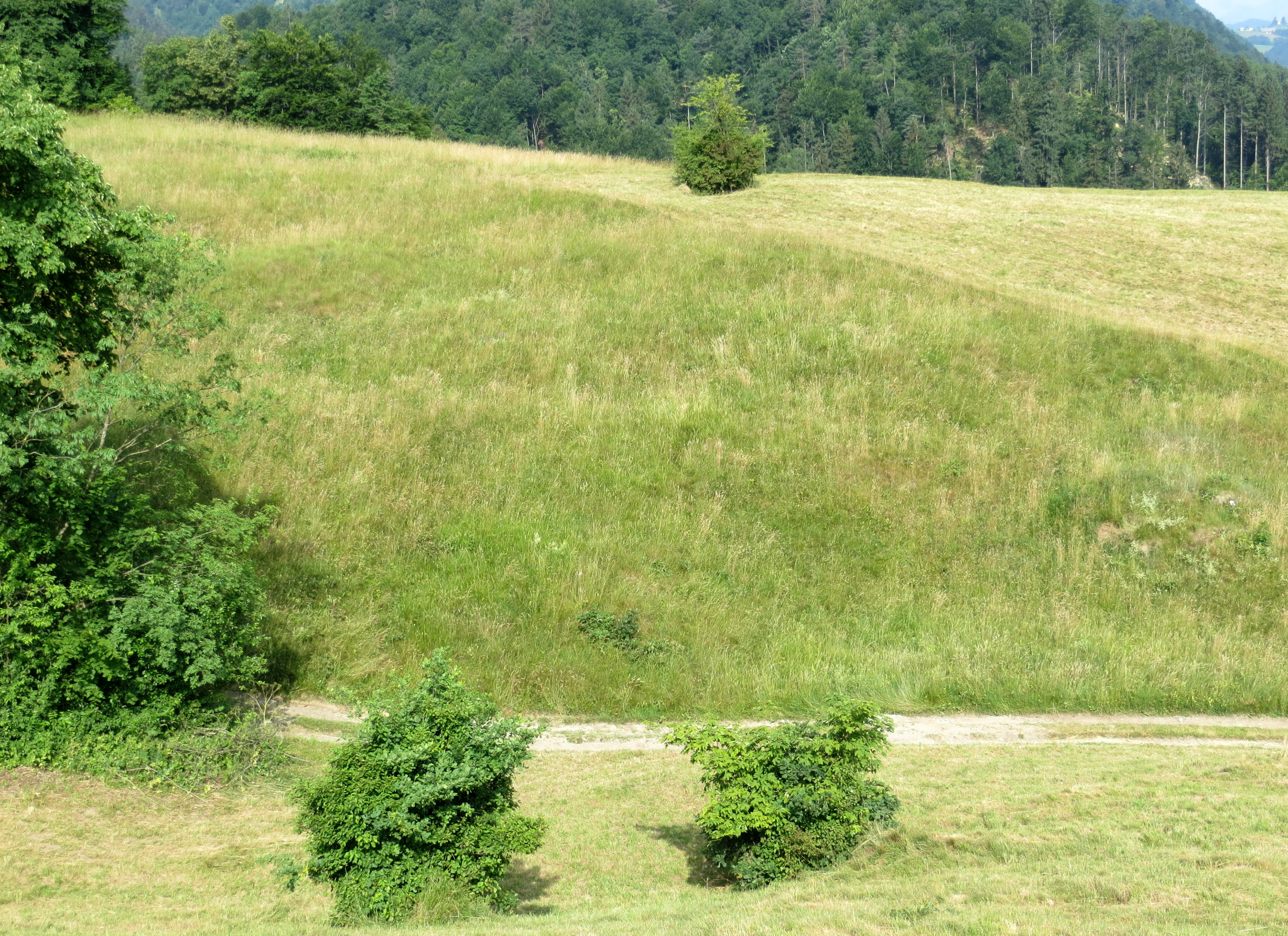
Bear Valley Mass Grave

Vincarje is the site of two known mass graves from the period immediately after the Second World War. They are part of the mass graves associated with the nearby former Loka Castle prison. The Castle Wall 1 Mass Grave (Slovene: Grobišče pri grajskem obzidju 1) is located in a meadow on a slope about 30 meters (98 ft) outside the wall of Loka Castle. It contains the remains of an unknown number of Home Guard prisoners of war and Slovene civilians, and possibly victims of other nationalities. The Bear Valley Mass Grave (Grobišče v Medvedovi dolini), also known as the Ski Valley Mass Grave (Grobišče Smučarska dolina), lies in the Bear Valley Sinkhole (Medvedova dolina), about 500 meters (1,600 ft) southwest of Loka Castle and 200 meters (660 ft) west of the castle wall. It contains the remains of 20 German prisoners of war that died or were murdered in the summer of 1945. The remains may have been exhumed.
