= Pevno =

Place in Upper Carniola, Slovenia

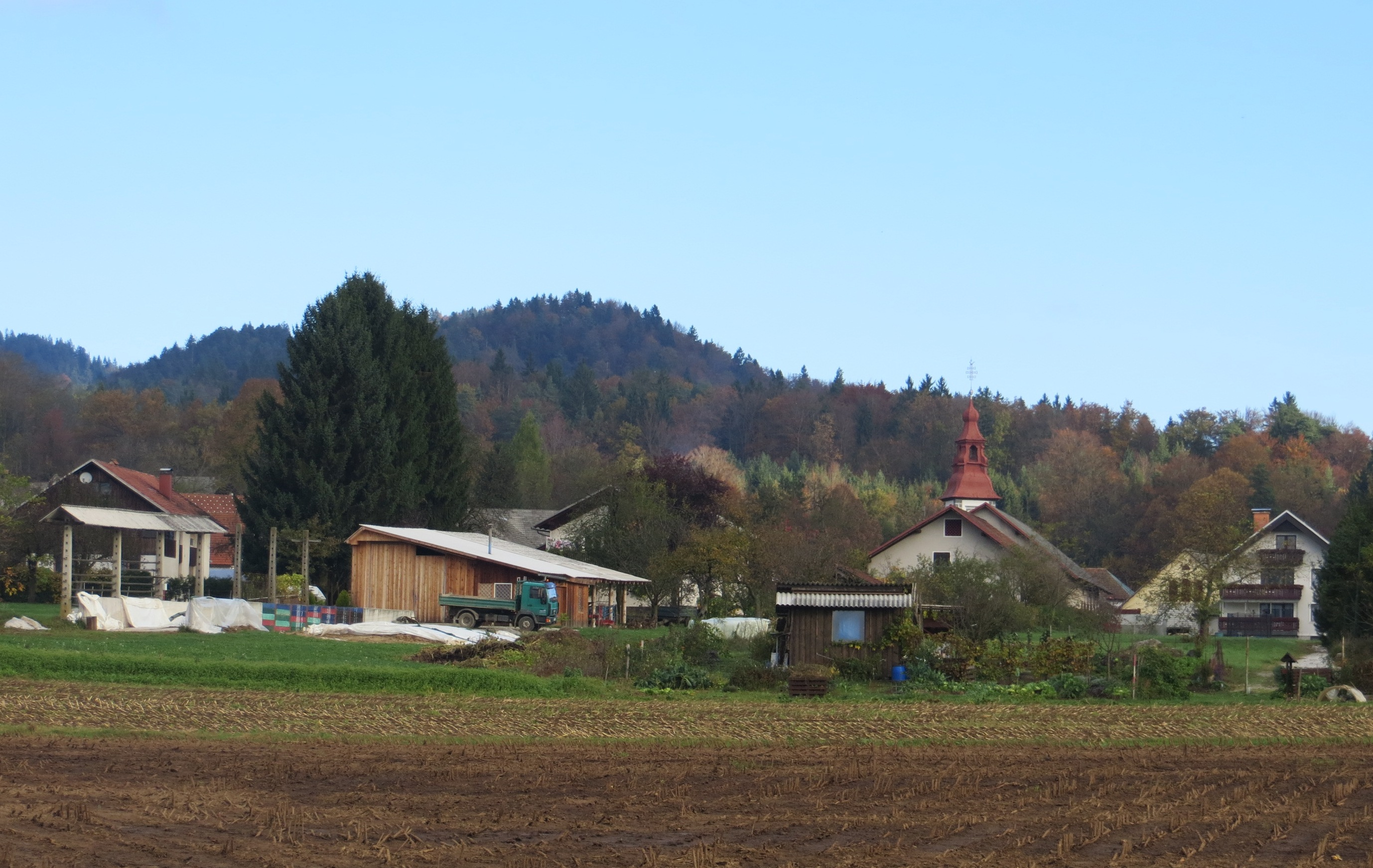

- Location in Slovenia
- Coordinates: 46°11′24.19″N 14°18′0.11″E
- Country: Slovenia
- Traditional region: Upper Carniola
- Statistical region: Upper Carniola
- Municipality: Škofja Loka

Area
  - Total: 3.17 km^{2} (1.22 sq mi)
- Elevation: 401.1 m (1,316 ft)

Population (2002)
  - Total: 59

Pevno (pronounced [ˈpeːu̯nɔ]; in older sources also Peven, German: Pewen) is a small village in the Municipality of Škofja Loka in the Upper Carniola region of Slovenia.

== Mass grave ==
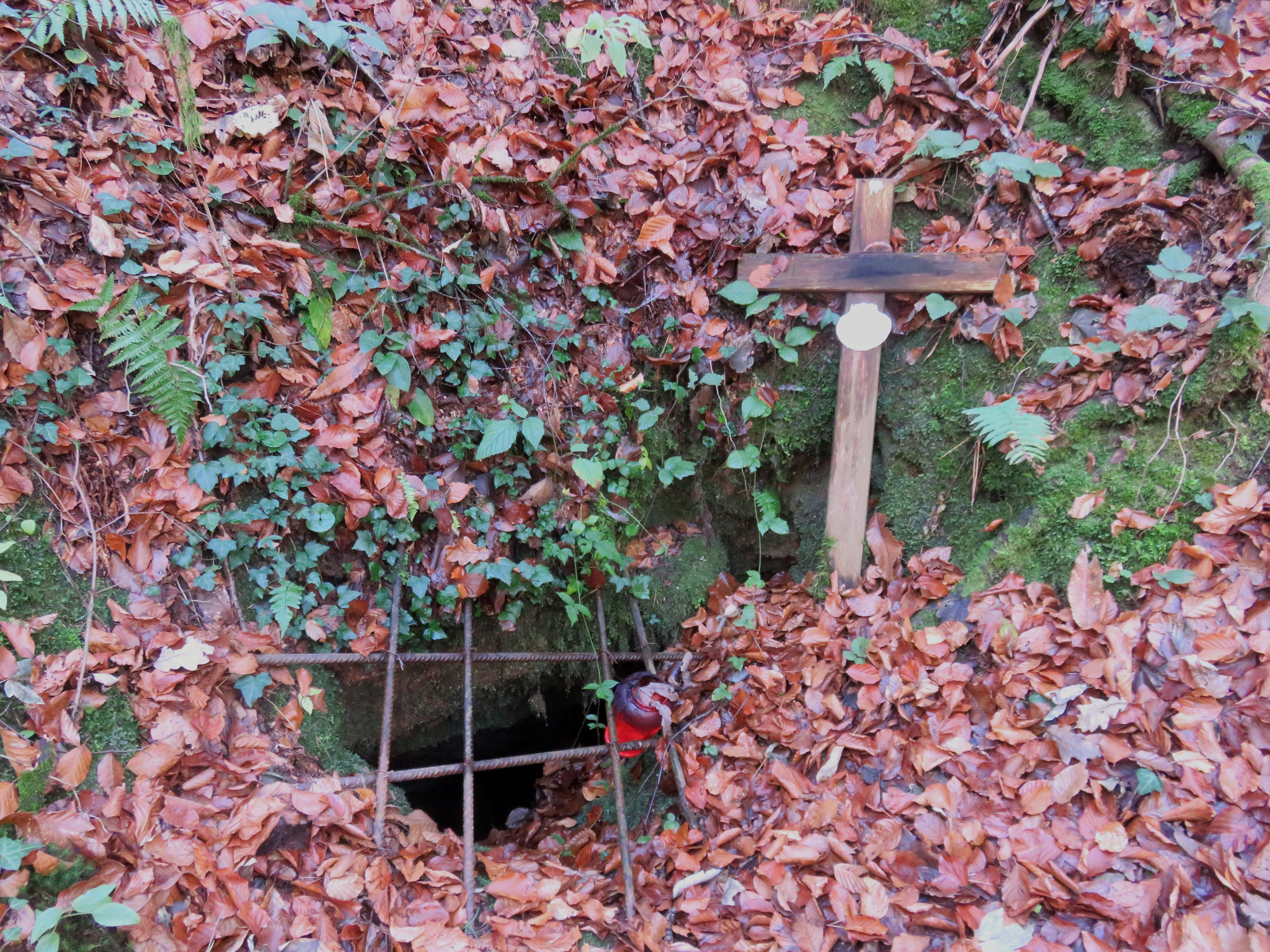
Matjaž Cave Mass Grave

Pevno is the site of a mass grave from the period immediately after the Second World War. The Matjaž Cave Mass Grave (Slovene: Grobišče Matjaževa jama) is located on a steep slope 400 meters (1,300 ft) west of the village of Pevno. It contains the remains of Home Guard prisoners of war that were held at Loka Castle and murdered between 25 and 30 May 1945. It may also contain the remains of a group murdered before the end of the war.

== Church ==
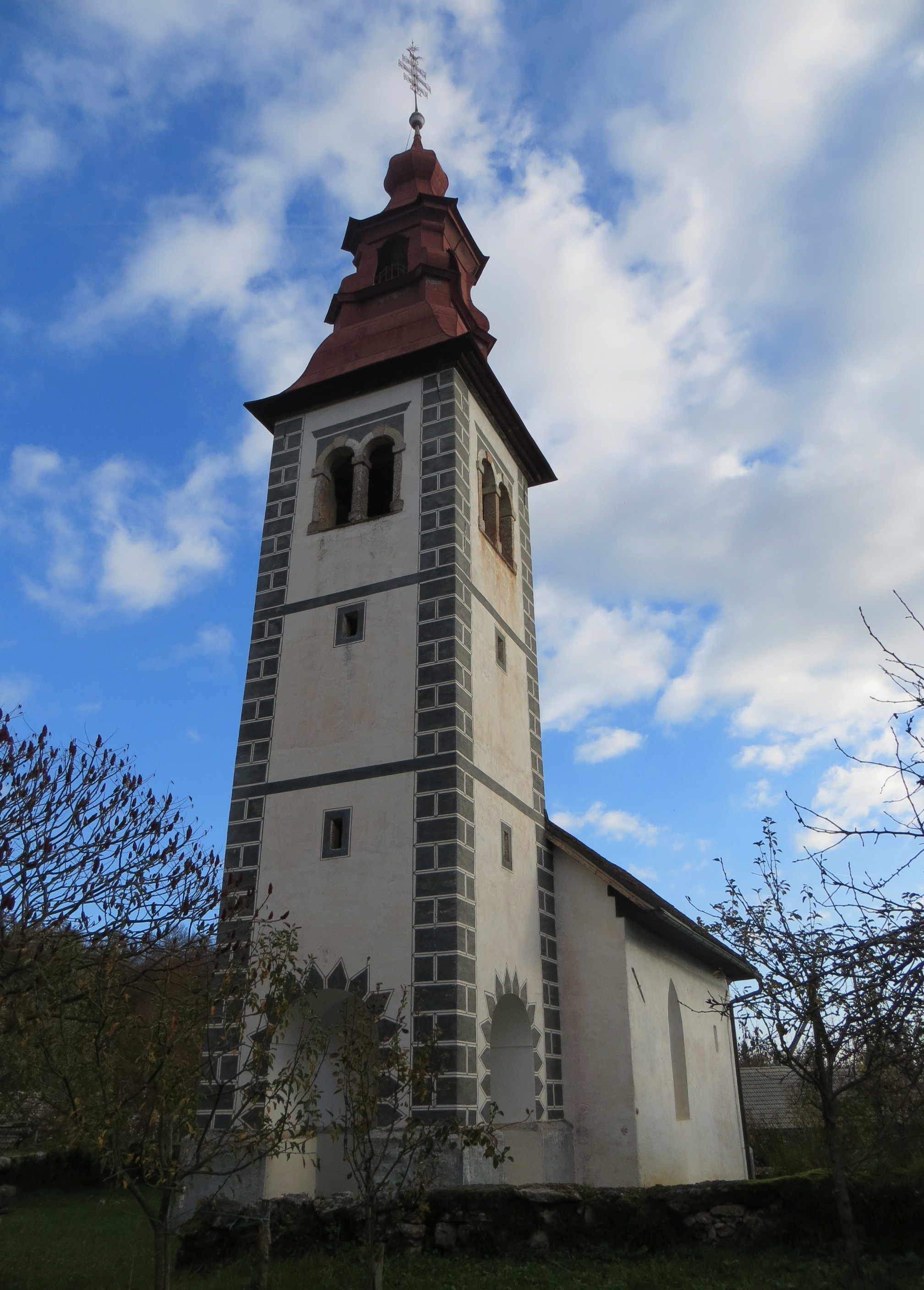
Saint Ursula's Church

The local church is dedicated to Saint Ursula. It belongs to the parish of Stara Loka.
