= Bodovlje =

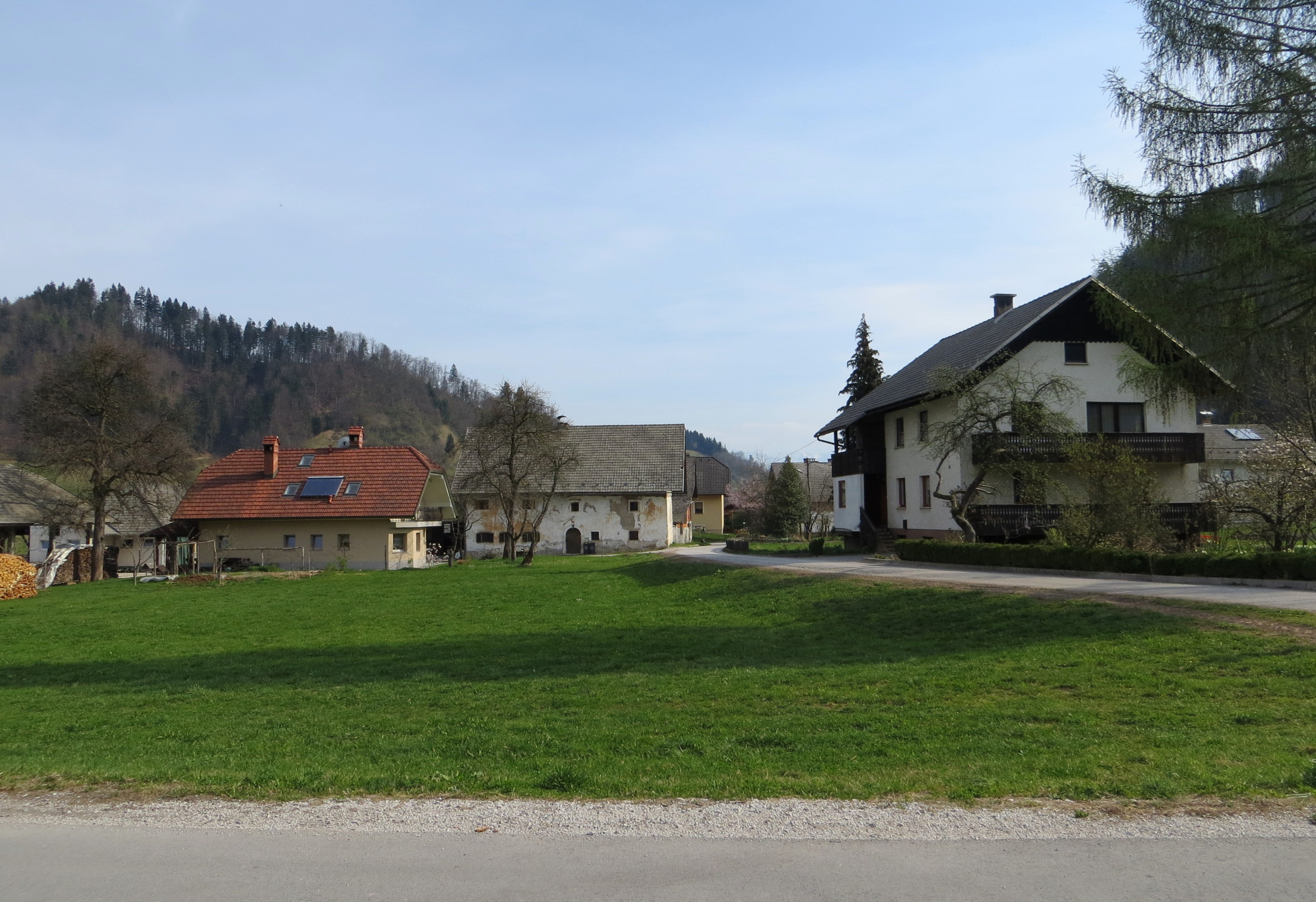

- Location in Slovenia
- Coordinates: 46°8′57.32″N 14°17′37.74″E
- Country: Slovenia
- Traditional region: Upper Carniola
- Statistical region: Upper Carniola
- Municipality: Škofja Loka

Area
  - Total: 1.37 km^{2} (0.53 sq mi)
- Elevation: 357.2 m (1,172 ft)

Population (2002)
  - Total: 175

Bodovlje (pronounced [ˈboːdɔu̯ljɛ]; German: Wodovlje) or Wodoule is a village in the Municipality of Škofja Loka in the Upper Carniola region of Slovenia.

== Geography ==
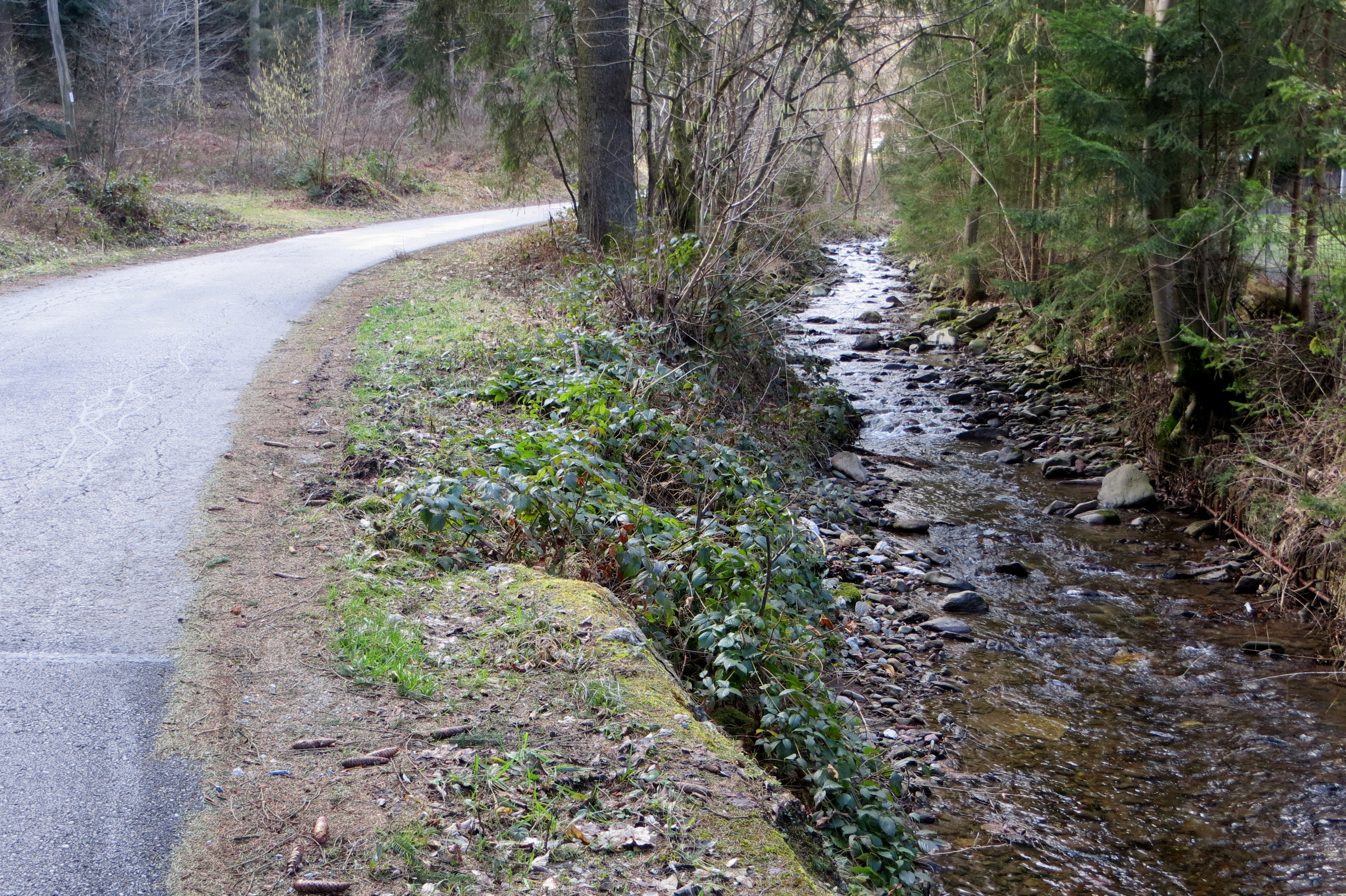
Bodovlje Creek south of the village

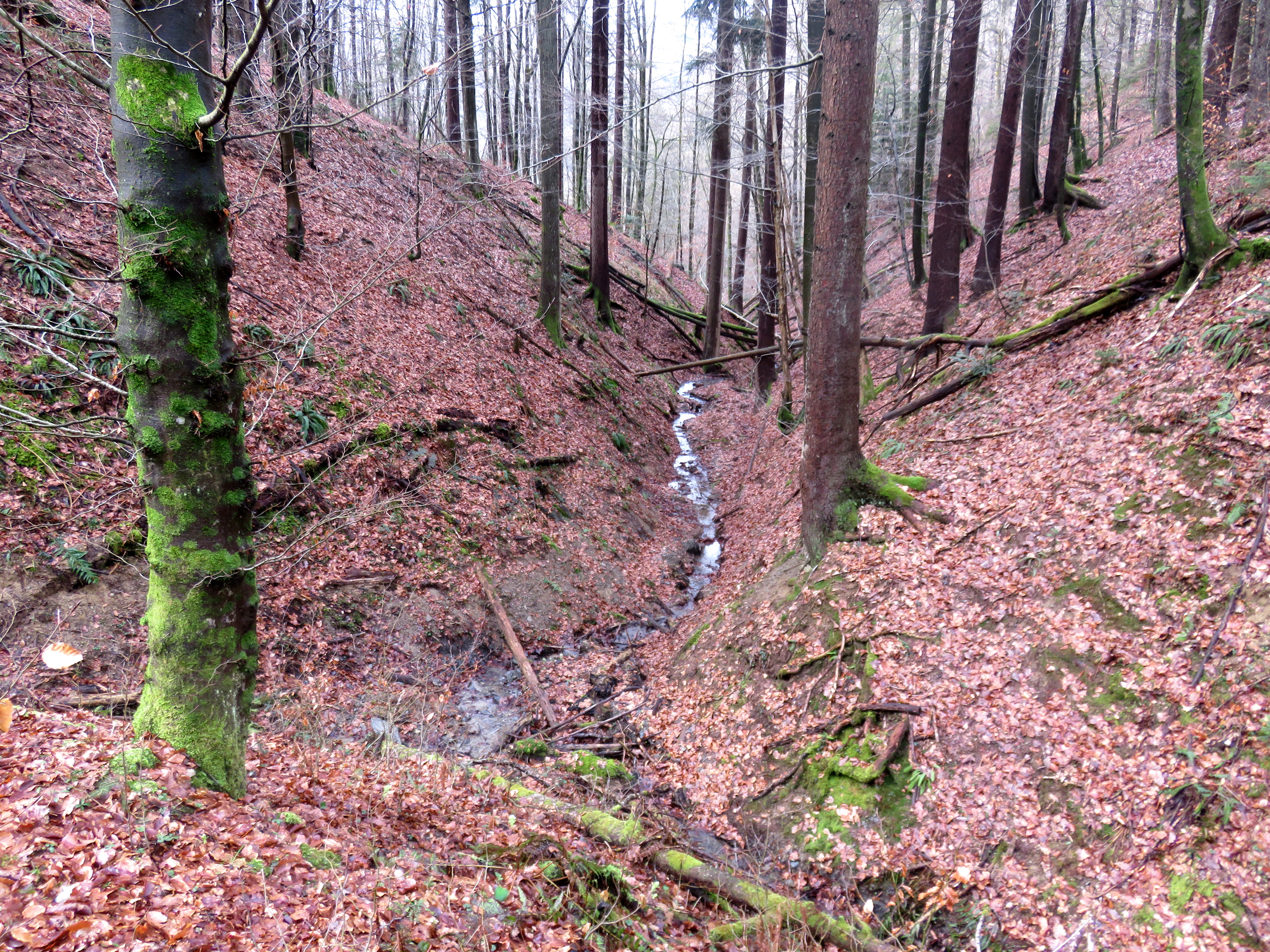
A tributary of Bodovlje Creek on Žerovec Hill

Bodovlje is a clustered village that lies on the right bank of the Poljane Sora River, along both sides of Bodovlje Creek (Slovene: Bodoljska grapa), which is mostly fed by small right tributaries from the neighboring hills. Most of the settlement is on the floodplain along the river, but some houses also stand in the narrow valley along the creek. The creek valley is bounded by Dešna Hill (elevation 505 meters or 1,657 feet) and Žerovec Hill (Žerovcov hrib, elevation 543 meters or 1,781 feet) to the east and Saint Peter's Hill (Svetega Petra hrib, elevation 674 meters or 2,211 feet) to the southwest. There are fields and meadows in the flat area along the river, and the creek valley and hillsides are forested.

== Name ==
Bodovlje was attested in written records in 1291 and 1318 as Vondeul (and as Wodobli in 1500). The name is presumably derived from the plural demonym *Bǫdovľane, created from a place name such as *Bǫdovľe (selo) (literally, 'Bǫdъ's village'), based on the personal name *Bǫdь or *Bǫdъ. An alternate, but less likely, theory is that the name is derived from *ǫdolьje 'valleys' via prothesis and the phonological development v > b, known as betacizem in Slovene (i.e., *ǫd- > *vǫd- > *bǫd-). In the past, the settlement was known as Wodovlje or Wodoule in German.

== History ==
=== Mass grave ===
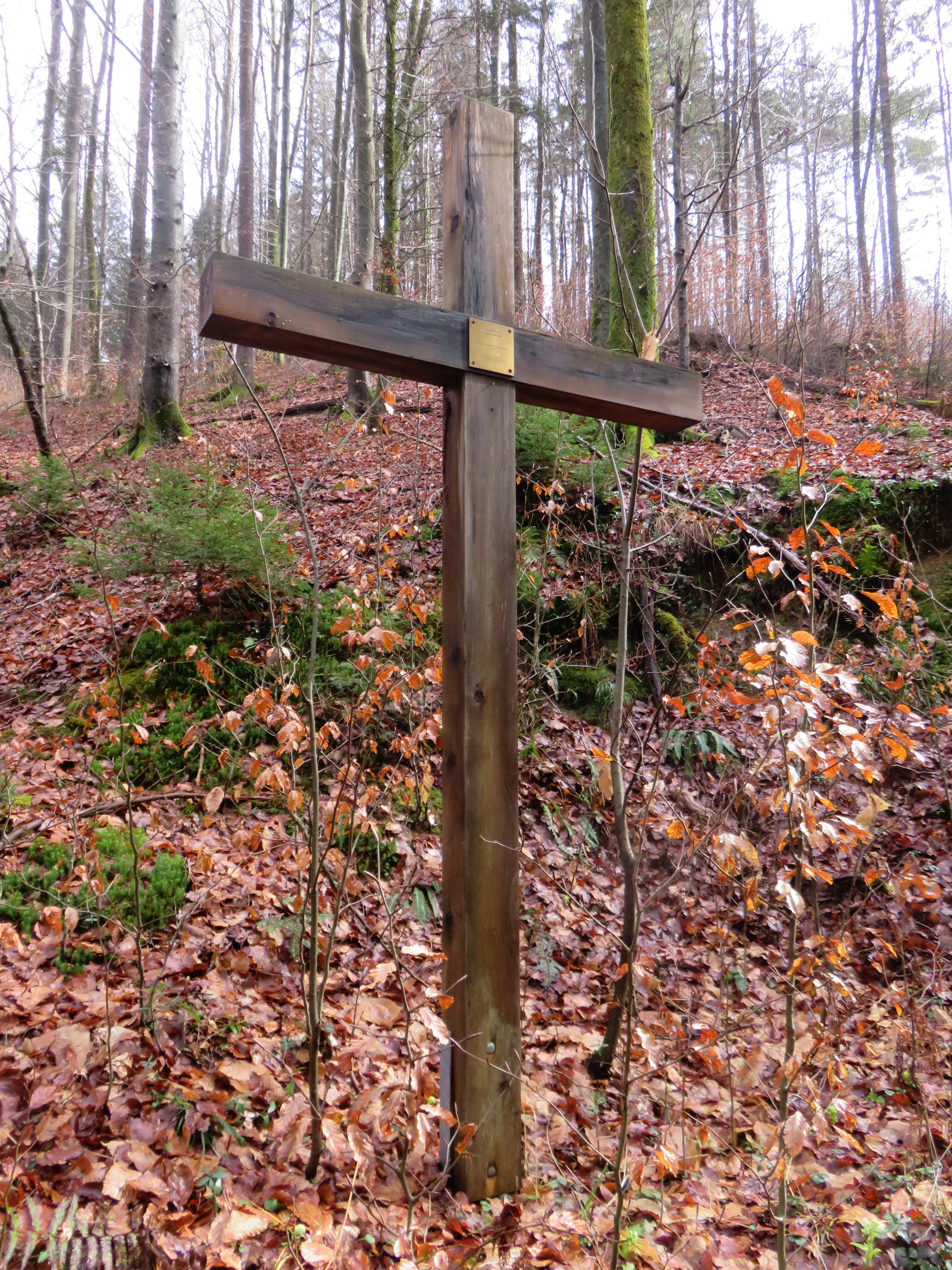
Cross at the Bodovlje Mass Grave

Bodovlje is the site of a mass grave from the period immediately after the Second World War. The Bodovlje Mass Grave (Slovene: Grobišče Bodovlje) is located on a steep forest slope 200 m southeast of the village. It contains the remains of 22 to 24 Home Guard prisoners of war that were taken from the prison at Loka Castle on the night of 29 May 1945, murdered, and buried in a former Partisan bunker.

=== Post–World War II ===
The Termika factory was established in Bodovlje in 1958. It produced mineral wool and employed about 220 people. The site of the plant was formerly a veneer factory.

== Church ==
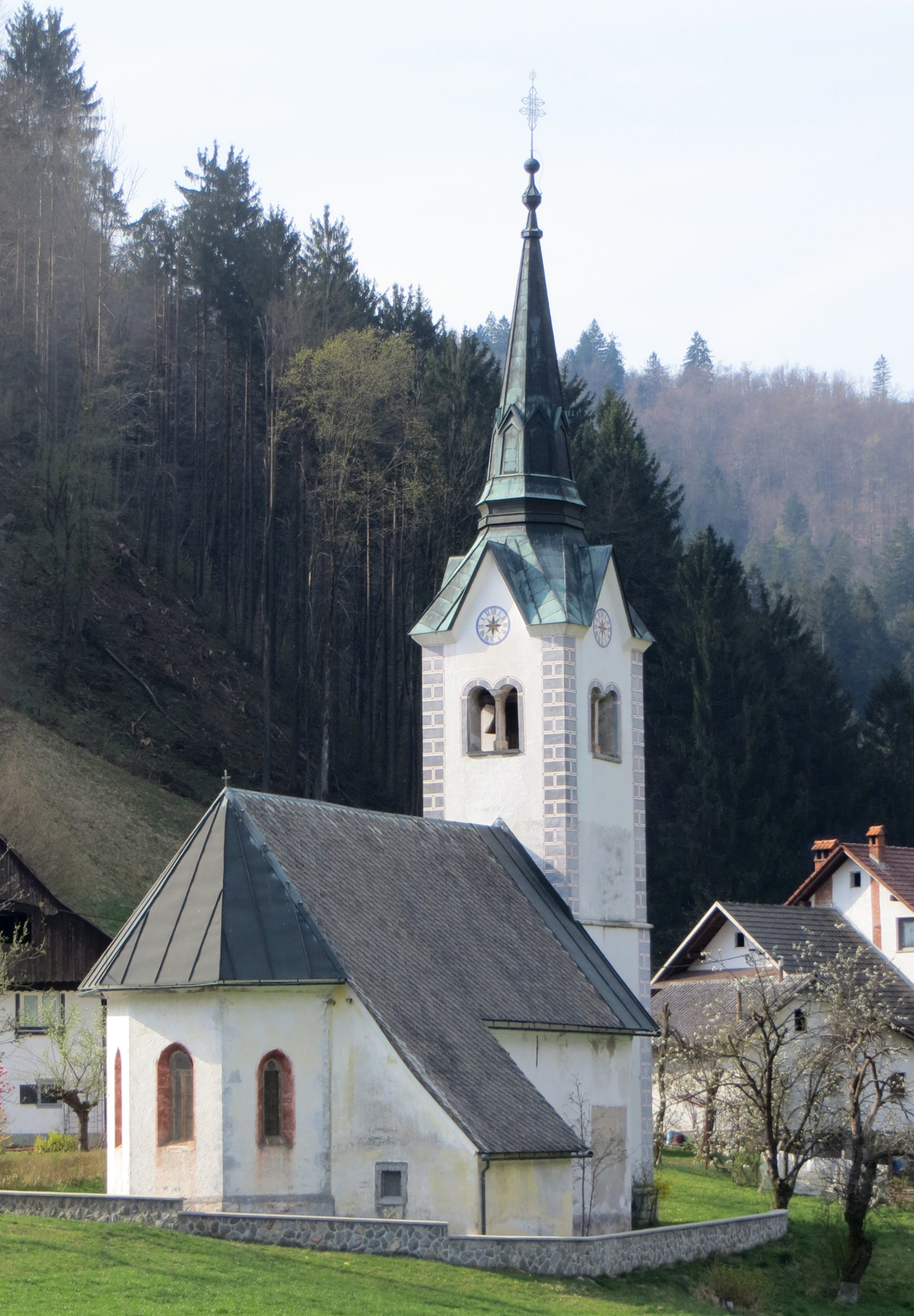
Saint Peter's Church

The local church is dedicated to Saint Peter. It dates to the early 16th century, although the nave was vaulted in the Baroque style at a later date. The nave contains remains of frescos from the early 16th century. The sanctuary is also decorated with saints in the lower borders, apostles at window height, and evangelists and angels higher up, all by the painter Jernej of Loka dating to between 1525 and 1540. The church altars date to the 18th century.
