= Trnje, Škofja Loka =

Trnje
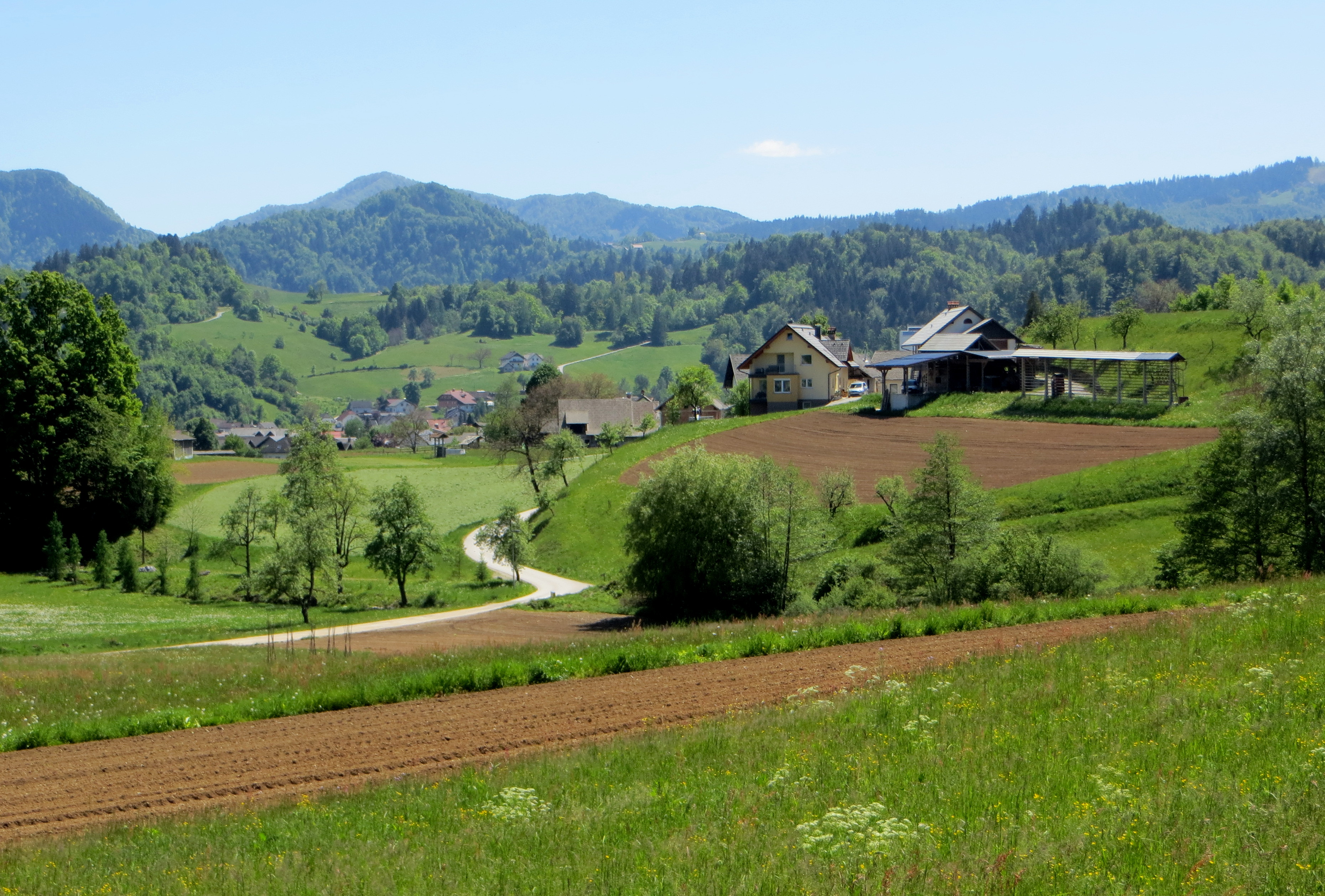

- Location in Slovenia
- Coordinates: 46°10′39.36″N 14°17′37.83″E
- Country: Slovenia
- Traditional region: Upper Carniola
- Statistical region: Upper Carniola
- Municipality: Škofja Loka

Area
  - Total: 0.44 km^{2} (0.17 sq mi)
- Elevation: 382.8 m (1,256 ft)

Population (2002)
  - Total: 59

Trnje (pronounced [ˈtəɾnjɛ]; German: Terne) is a settlement in the Municipality of Škofja Loka in the Upper Carniola region of Slovenia.

== Mass grave ==
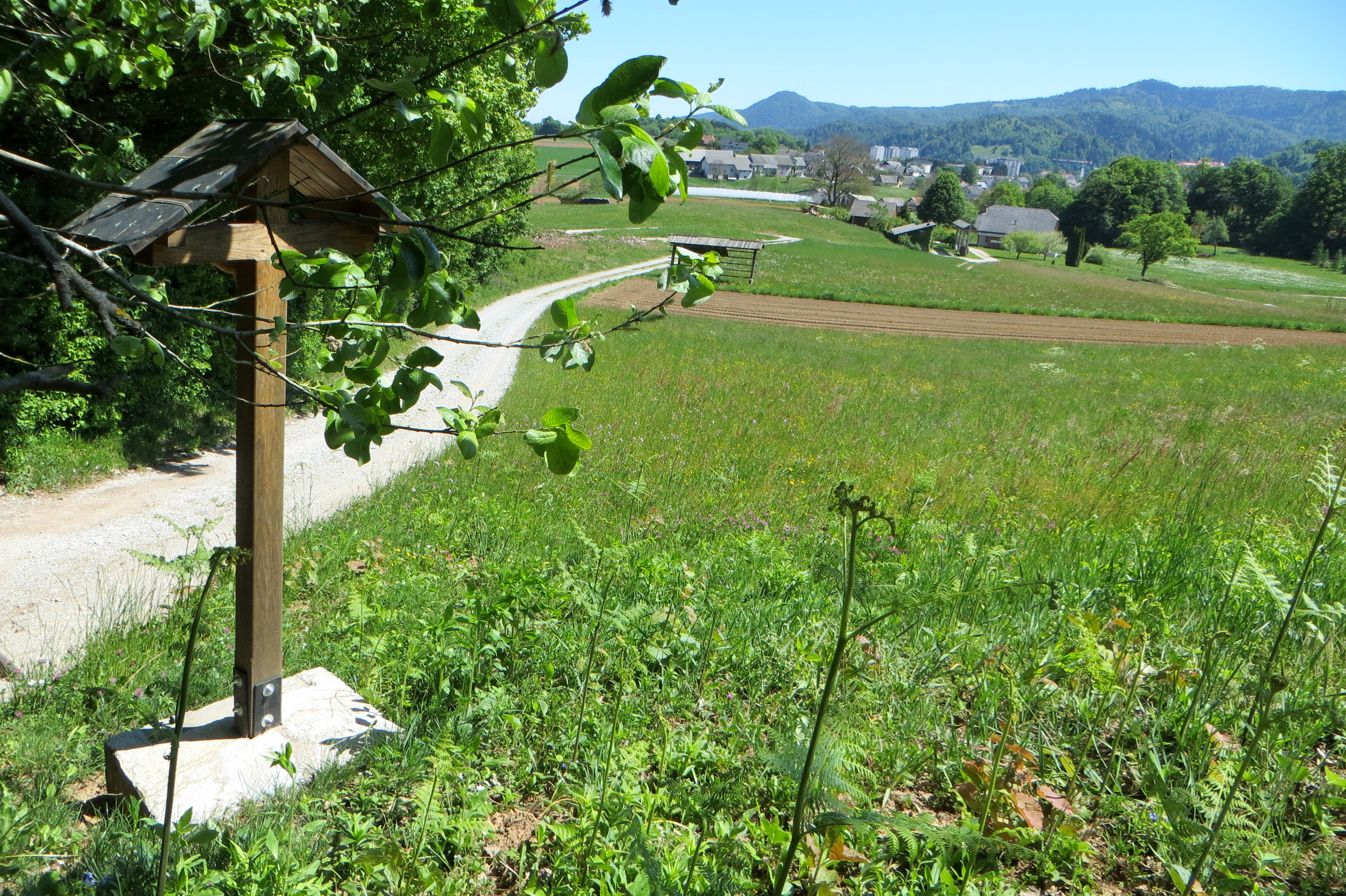
Podtrn Mass Grave

Trnje is the site of a mass grave associated with World War II. The Podtrn Mass Grave (Slovene: Grobišče Podtrn) is located on a path about 300 meters (980 ft) north of the settlement. It contains the remains of seven victims believed to be Home Guard prisoners of war from nearby villages that were imprisoned at Loka Castle.
