= Bringer =

Bringer may refer to:

- Bringer of light (or lightbringer), a nickname for Satan in Abrahamic religion
- Bringer of Blood, a 2003 album by Six Feet Under
- Bringer of Plagues, a 2009 album by Divine Heresy
- Bringer of War, a 2000 EP by Rebaelliun
- Bringers of the First Evil, acolytes of the First Evil in the Buffy the Vampire Slayer television series
- Hfuhruhurr, a DC Comics villain also known as the Word-Bringer
- Death Bringer, a 1988 computer role-playing game
- Soma Bringer, a 2008 role-playing video game
- Fire Bringer, a 1999 young adult fantasy novel by David Clement-Davies
- Rachel Bringer (born 1971), American politician

== See also ==
- Lightbringer (disambiguation)
- Bring (disambiguation)
