= Pencho Georgiev =

Bulgarian painter and illustrator (1900–1940)

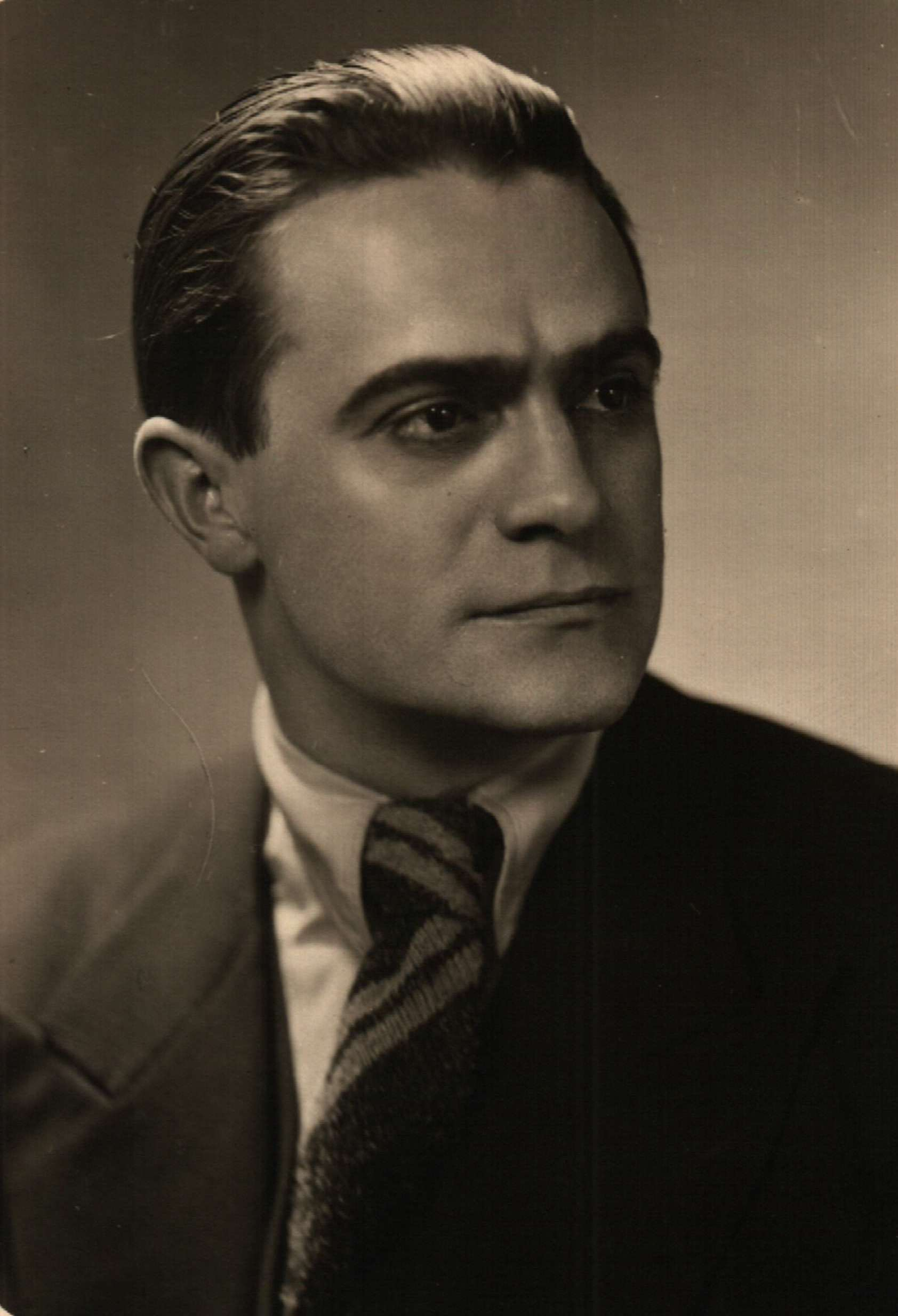
Pencho Georgiev (1936), from the Bulgarian State Archives

Pencho Georgiev (Bulgarian: Пенчо Георгиев; 1 February 1900, Vratsa – 2 April 1940, Sofia) was a Bulgarian painter, scenographer and illustrator, especially of children's books.

== Biography ==
His father died in the First Balkan War when he was only twelve. After the end of World War I, he moved to Sofia to study arts and crafts. In 1925, he graduated from the National Academy with a degree in "Applied and Decorative Arts" and began working as a set designer. His first project was The Queen of Spades by Tchaikovsky at the Sofia Opera. He stayed there for two years before moving on to the State Theater (known as the Dohodno Zdanie) in Ruse.

In 1929, he moved to Paris, where he copied the works of the Old Masters while making woodcuts and etchings. Later, he collaborated with the Russian painter Konstantin Korovin to create set decorations for productions of several Russian operas. He remained in Paris until 1932.

Upon returning to Bulgaria, he began illustrating books and creating interior designs for homes, as well as working on a number of public projects, creating over thirty set decorations at the Opera and the Ivan Vazov National Theatre. His paintings were done mostly in watercolors and pastels. His illustrations included some for the first works by Maxim Gorky published in Bulgarian. He also participated in many exhibitions, including the Salon d'Automne and the Milan Triennale.

In 1940, while working on decorations for Salammbô at the National Theater, he slipped and fell to his death down an elevator shaft on stage.

== Selected works ==
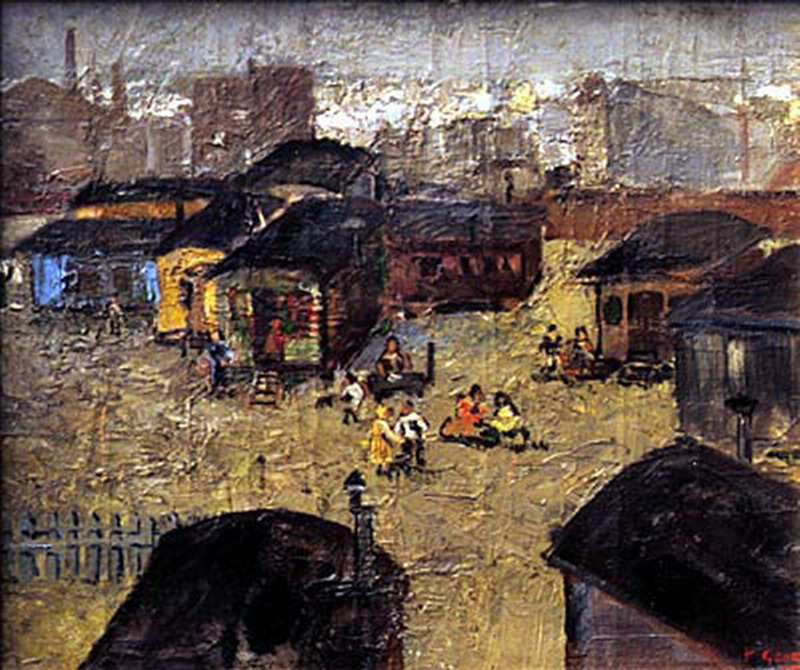
Temporary Encampment in Paris (1931)

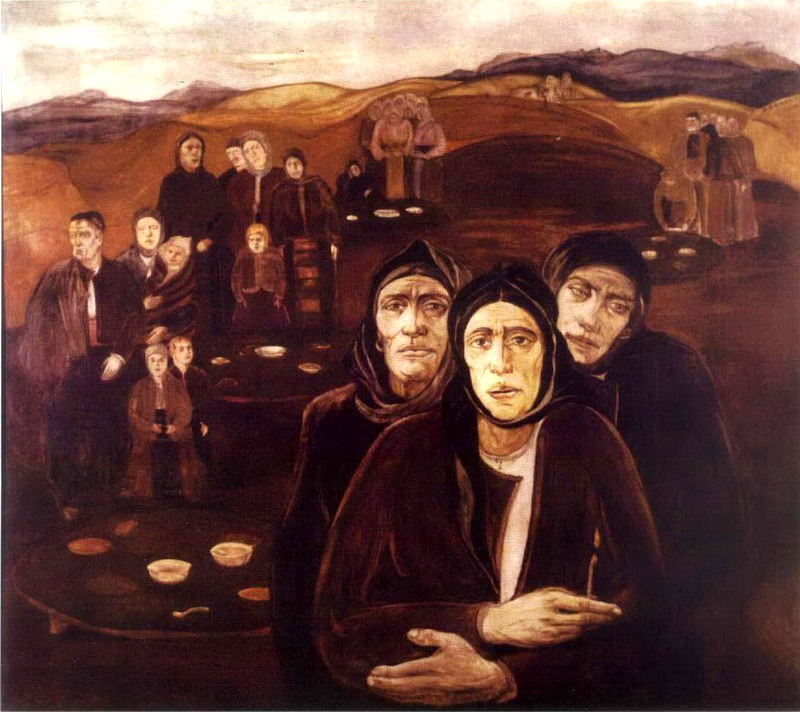
All Soul's Day (1927)

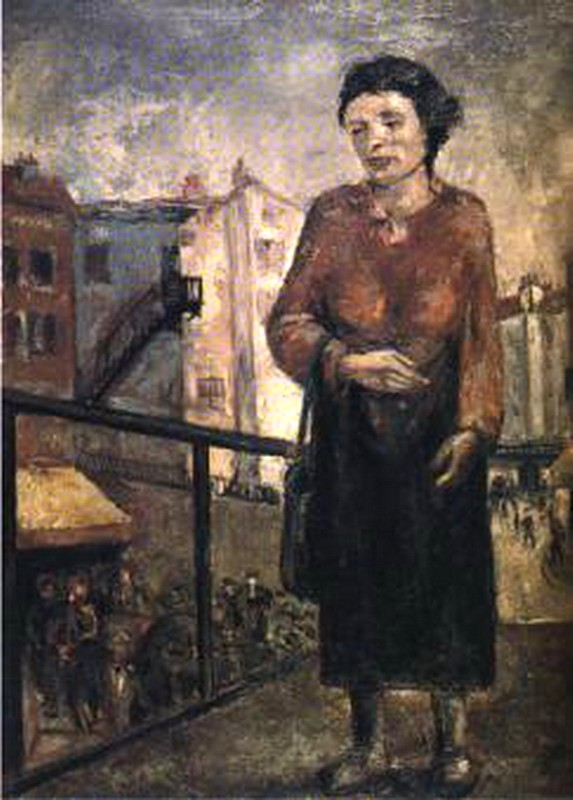
Parisian Neighborhood (1931)

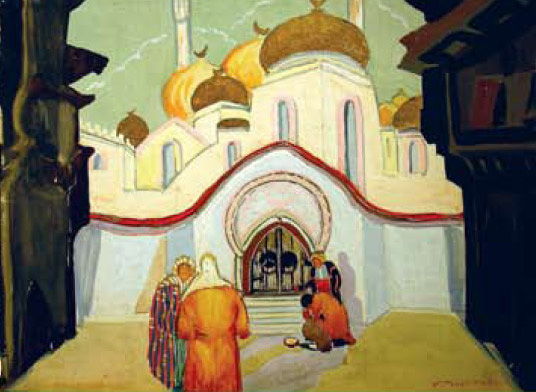
In Front of the Mosque (1930s)
