= Brang =

Brang is a given name and a surname. Notable people with the name include:

- Peter Paul Brang (1852–1925), Viennese architect
- Maran Brang Seng (1931–1994), Burmese politician

== See also ==
- Brang Biji River, Indonesia
- Bring (disambiguation)
