= Bring =

Bring may refer to:

- Erland Samuel Bring (1736–1798), Swedish mathematician
- Posten Bring, the Norwegian postal service, or its subsidiary Bring AS

== See also ==
- Brang
- Bringer (disambiguation)
- Carry (disambiguation)
