= Celje Hall =

Slovenian community center

Coordinates: 46°13′41.91″N 15°16′0.77″E

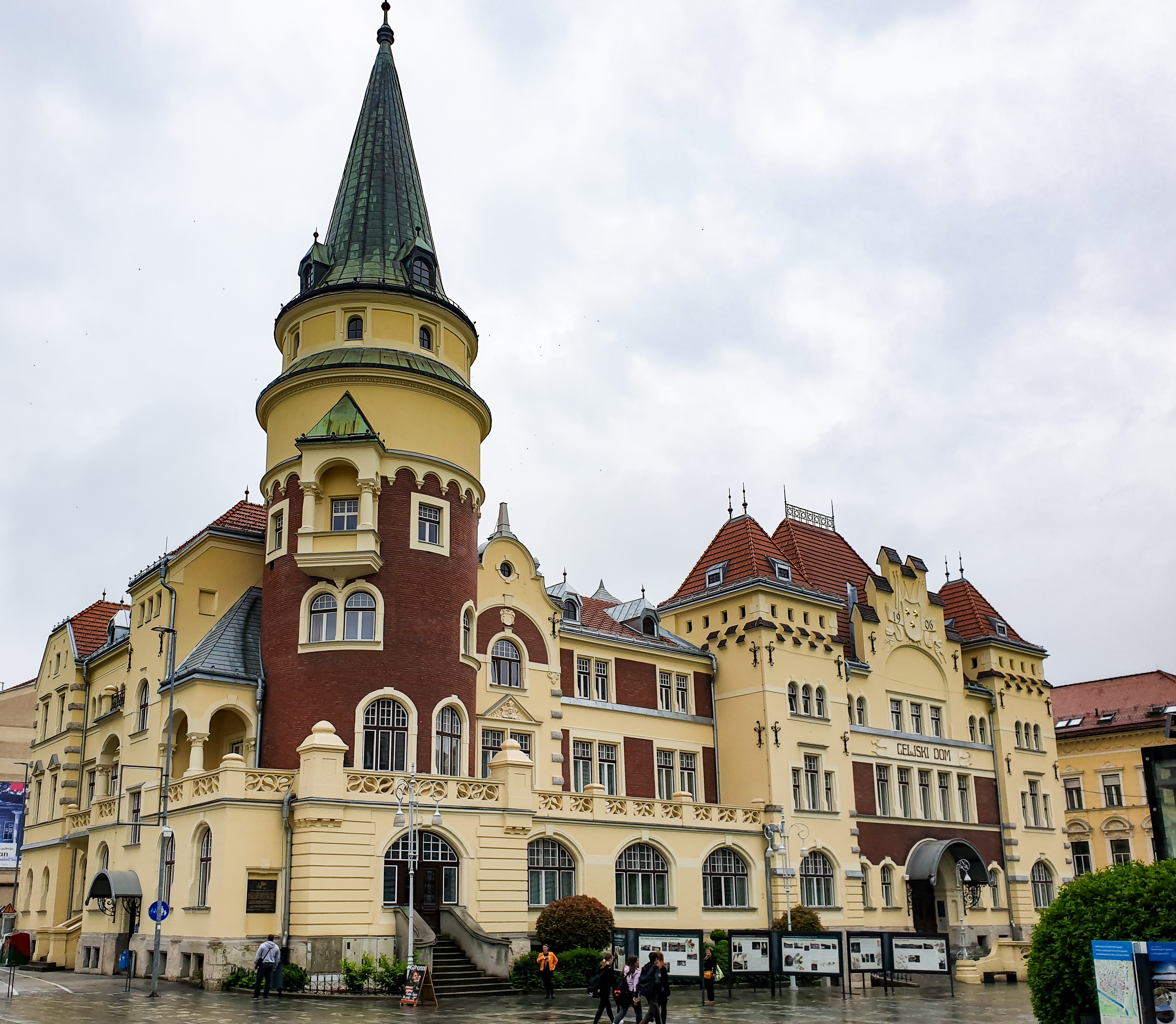

Celje Hall (Slovene: Celjski dom) is a community center in Celje, a town in central-eastern Slovenia. Today it hosts several cultural associations and the town's tourist information centre, and is a venue for concerts and theatre.

== Overview ==
The hall was built in an eclectic style by the Viennese architect Peter Paul Brang between 1905 and 1906 as the main seat of ethnic German associations in the town. It was opened on 15 May 1907. The hall was intended to contrast with Celje National Hall, which had a similar function for the local Slovenes. The building's original name was the "German Center" (German Deutsches Haus) and it was used as the main community center for the purposes of the local German-speaking population and by those that identified with German culture.

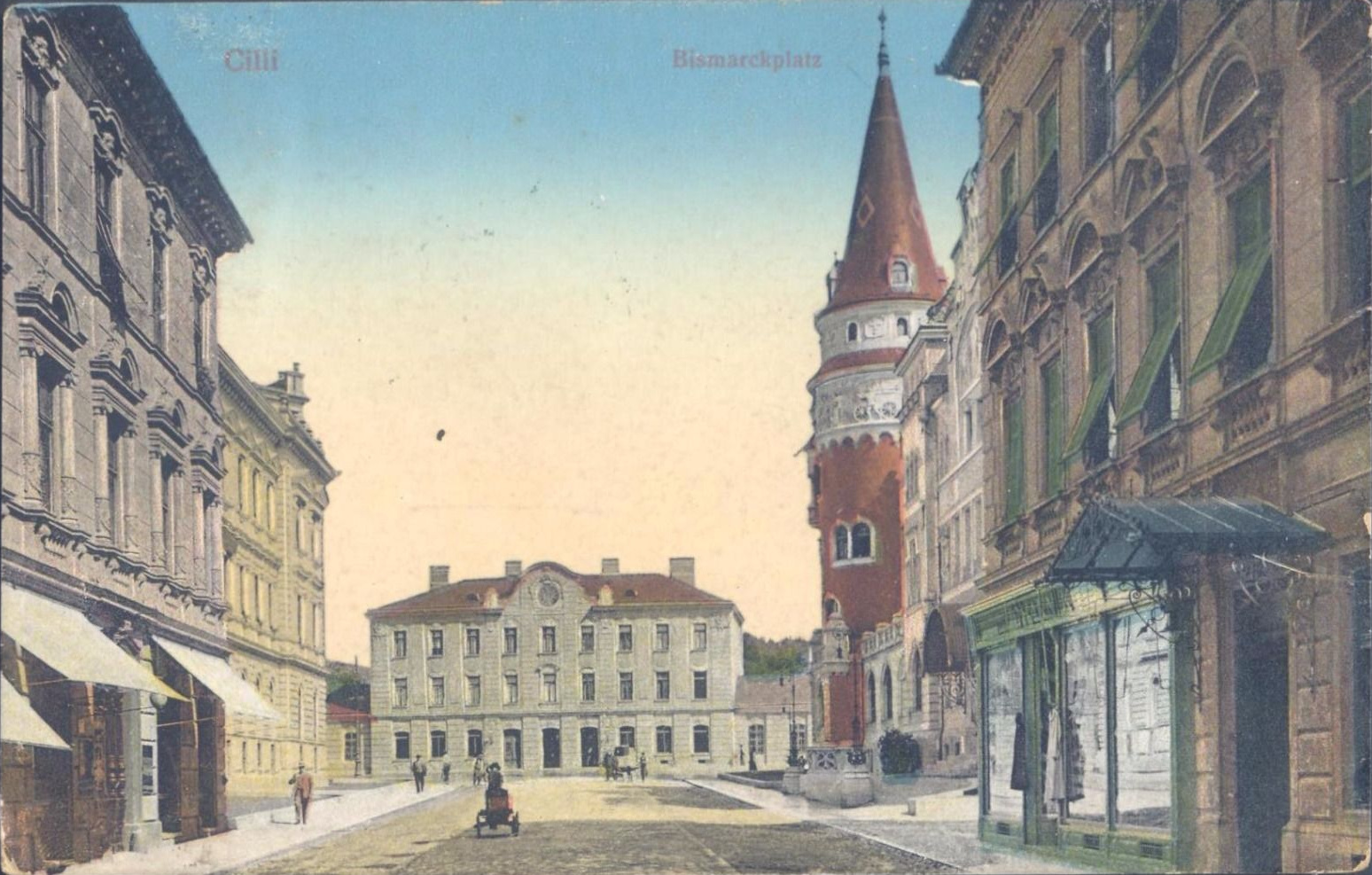
Celje Hall on the right and Iron Mansion on the far left in an old postcard

In 1919, after the dissolution of Austria-Hungary, the building was confiscated from the German community by the new Yugoslav authorities and renamed "Celje Hall". Several cultural associations were placed in the building, including the Hermagoras Society publishing house, which was after the Carinthian Plebiscite expelled from its original location in Klagenfurt, Austria. Throughout the period of the Kingdom of Yugoslavia, the German community tried to get back the property and the building, but they were unsuccessful. After the Nazi German occupation of northern Slovenia and Lower Styria in April 1941, the building was again restored to its former use. With the defeat of the Nazi regime in May 1945, most of the ethnic Germans fled the town together with the occupying German armed forces, whereas the others were expelled by the Yugoslav Communist authorities. The building was again renamed "Celje Hall".
