= Suceava Administrative Palace =

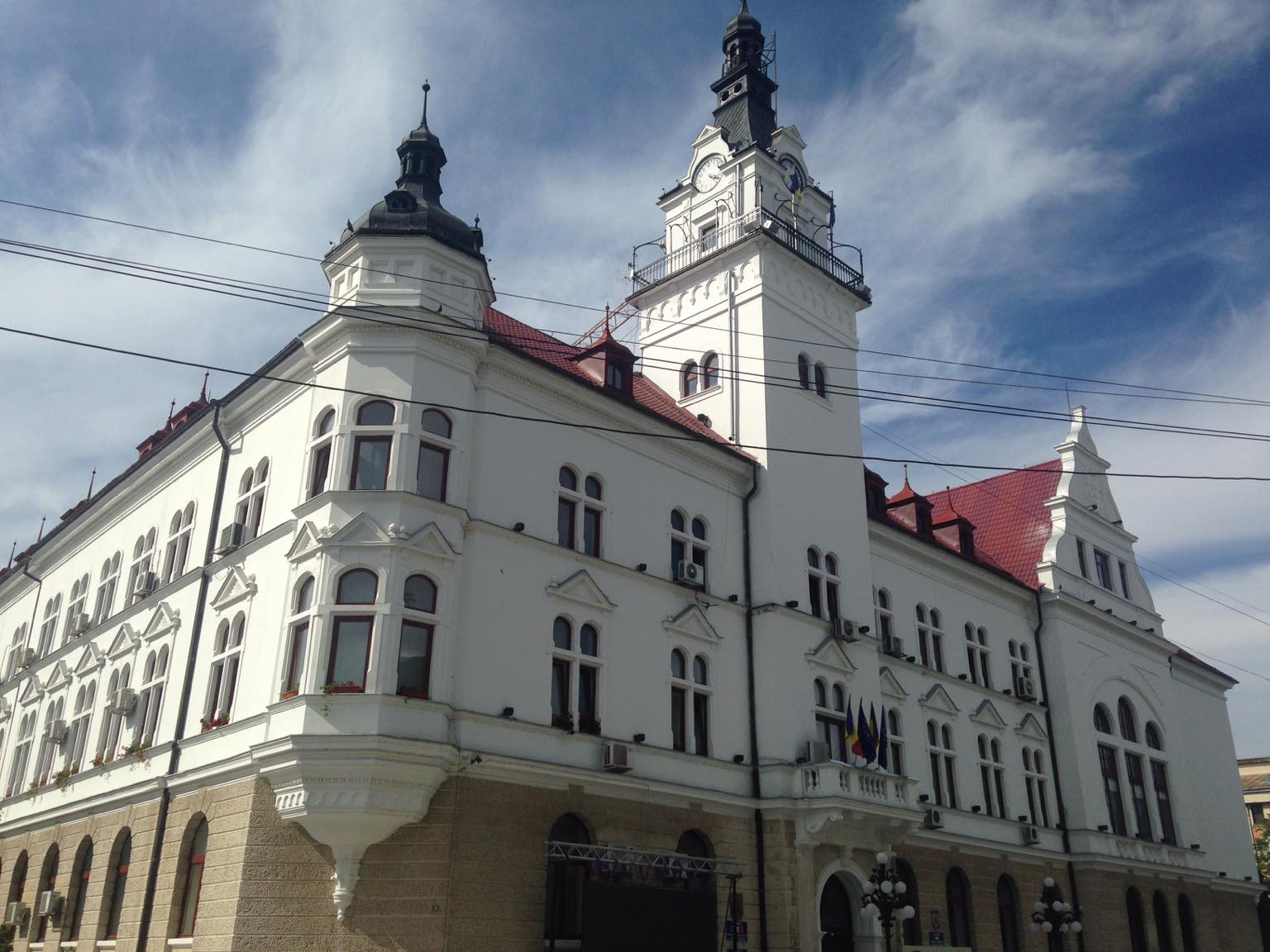
The Administrative Palace in Suceava, as seen in 2020.

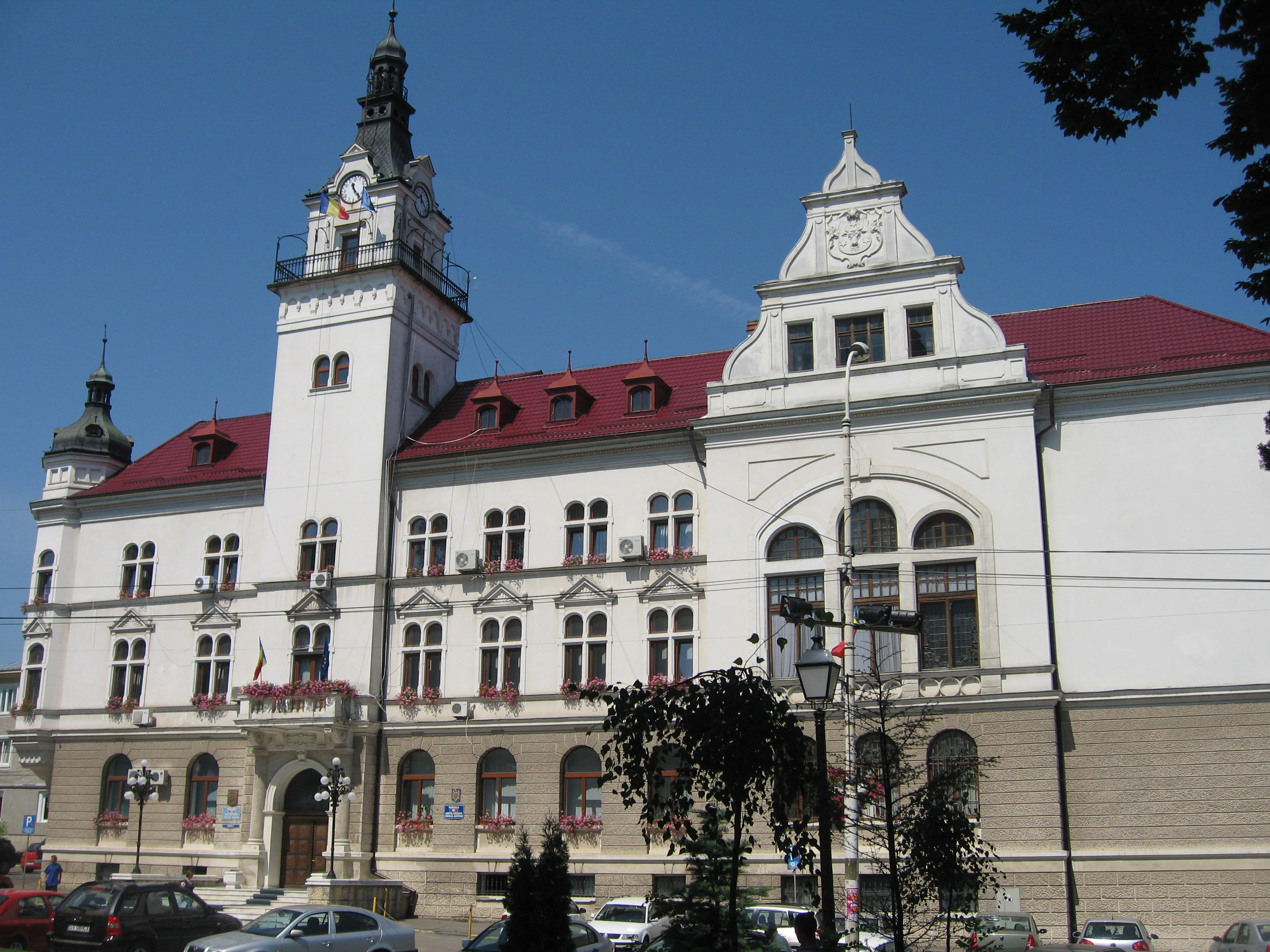
The Administrative Palace in Suceava, as seen in 2009.

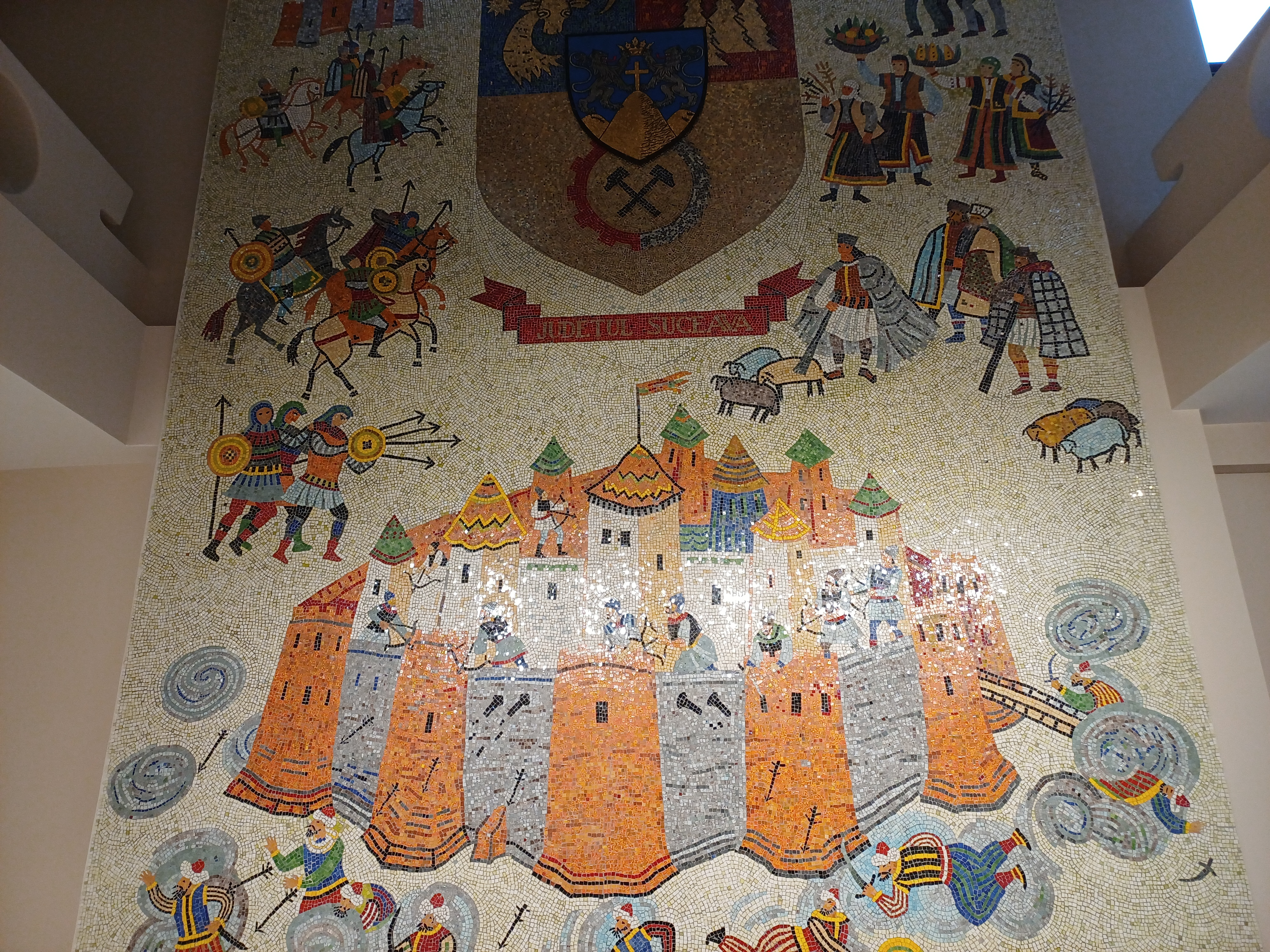
Communist era mosaic inside the Administrative Palace of Suceava

The Suceava Administrative Palace (Romanian: Palatul administrativ din Suceava, German: Verwaltungs palast in Suczawa) is a civic and historical building located at number 36 Ștefan cel Mare Street in Suceava (German: Suczawa), the seat town of Suceava County situated in the historical regions of Bukovina and Western Moldavia, northeastern Romania.

Designed by Austrian architect Peter Paul Brang, the building features a Baroque Revival style and dates to 1903–1904, when the town was part of the Duchy of Bukovina (German: Herzogtum Bukowina/Buchenland). Initially used as a town hall, it now houses the prefecture and the Suceava County Council. It is listed as a historic monument by Romania's Ministry of Culture and Religious Affairs.

The building caught fire in 2021, causing serious damage. Subsequently, in 2022, the Administrative Palace in Suceava has been undergoing rehabilitation/reconstruction works and its roof was renovated in October, 2025 and reopened. In early 2026, the Administrative Palace was already fully renovated (as it can be seen in the gallery section below).

== Gallery ==
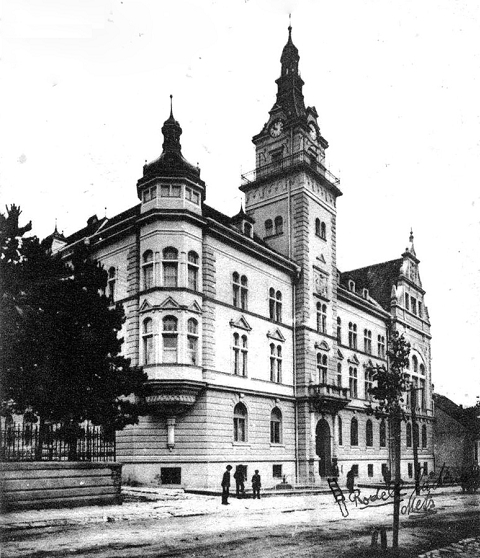
Dated black and white photograph of the Administrative Palace at the round of the 20th century, when Suceava was still under imperial Austrian administration

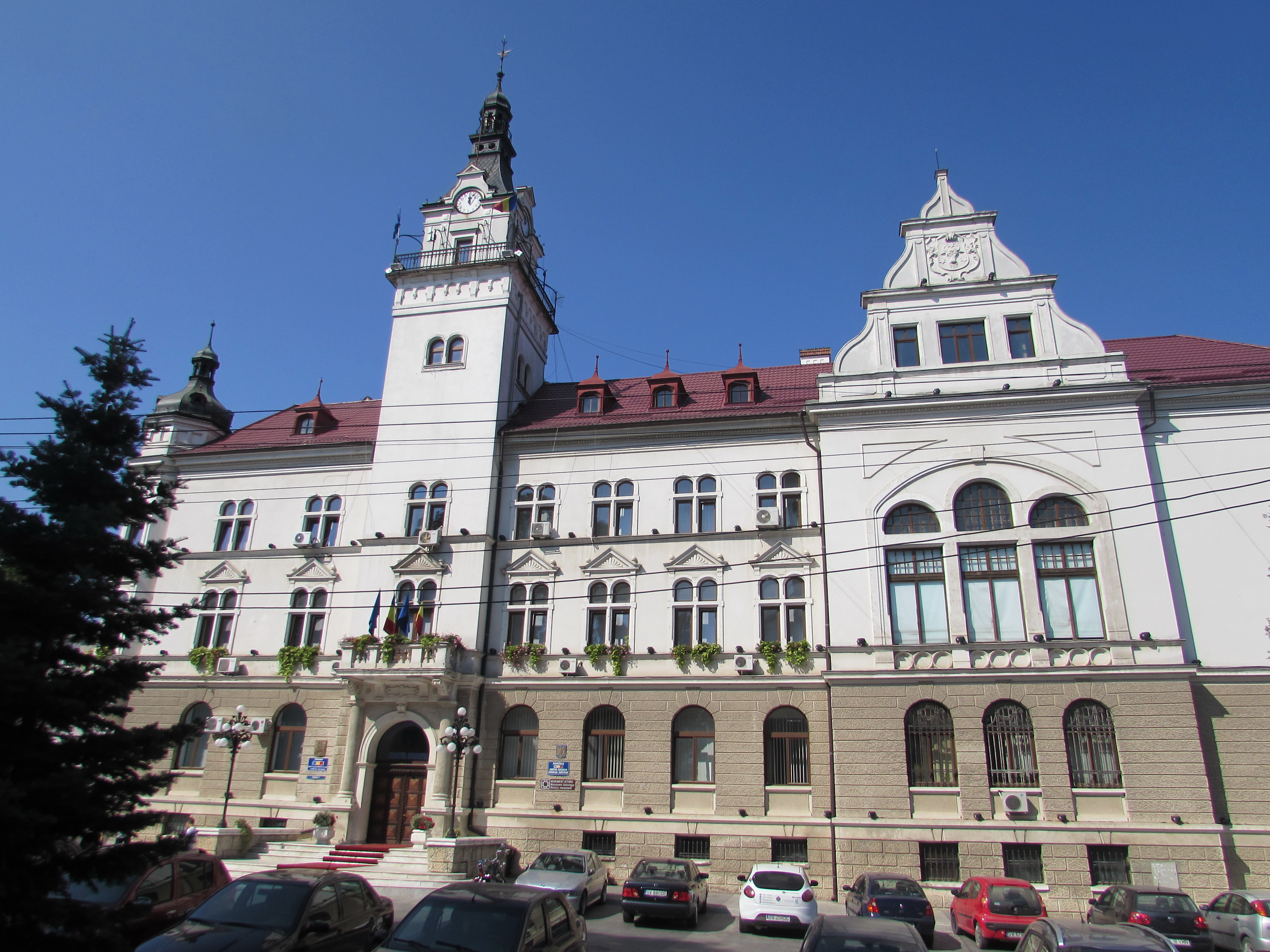
The Administrative Palace in 2009

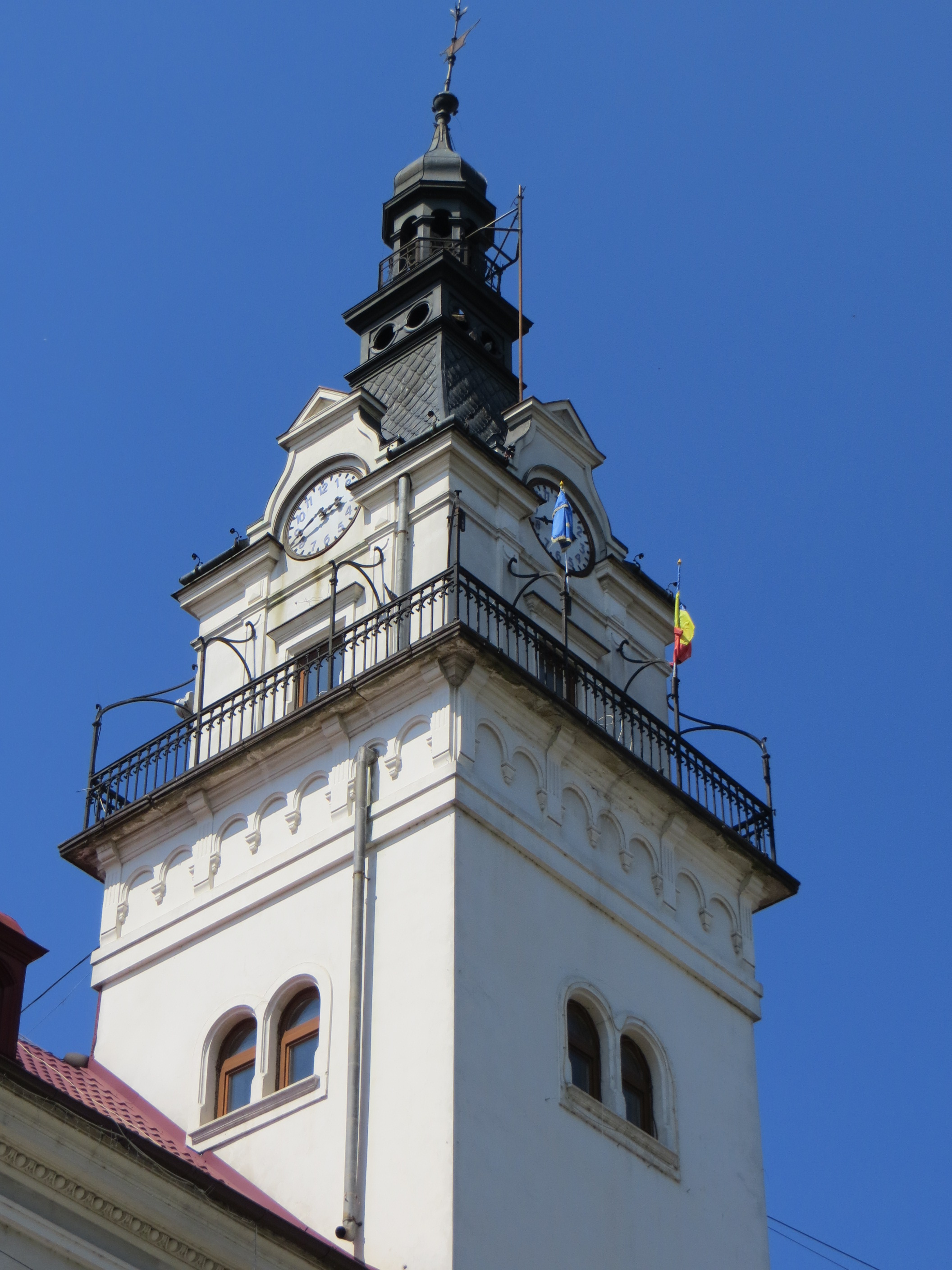
Detail of the tower of the tower of the Administrative Palace

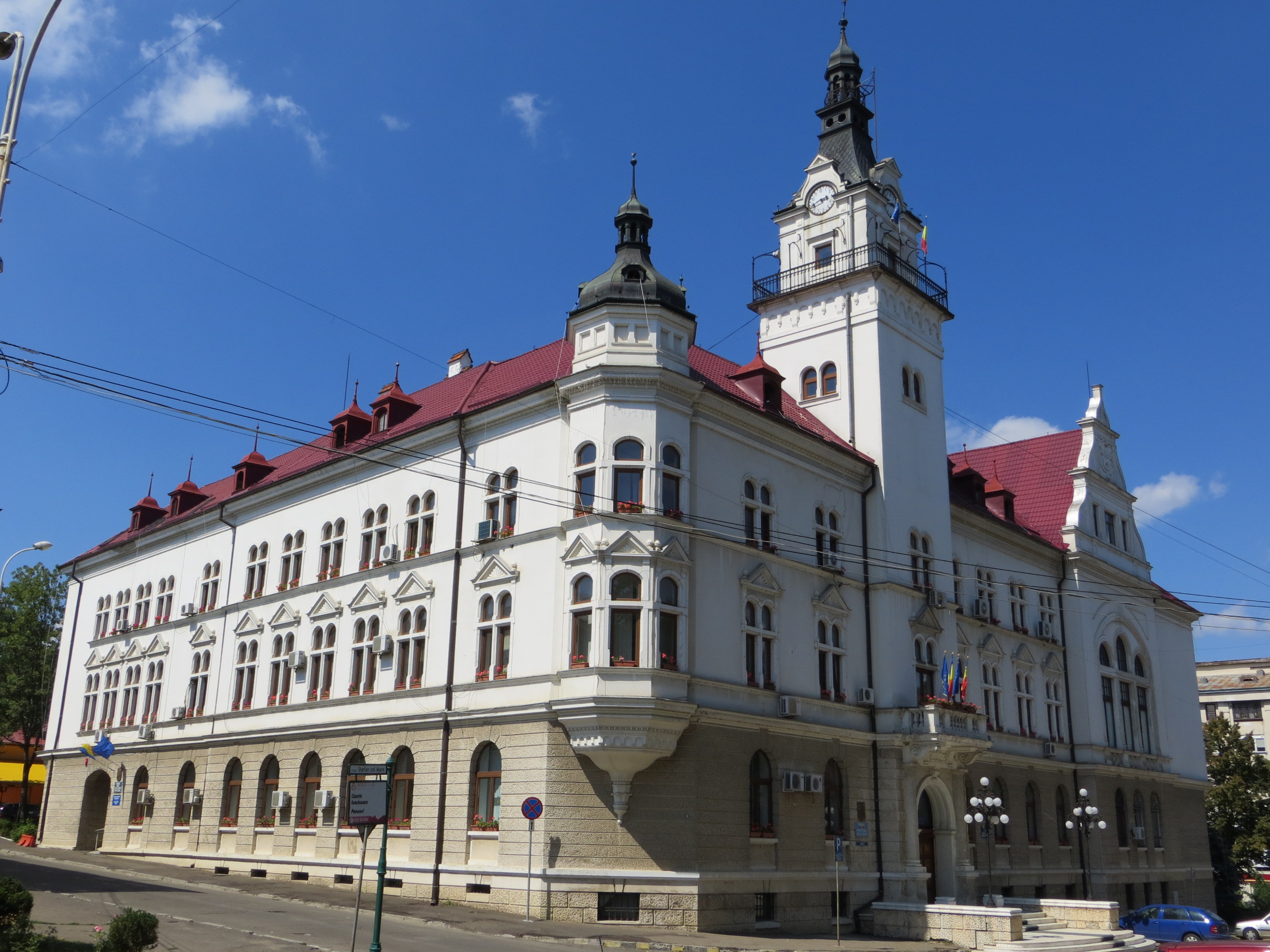
The Administrative Palace in Suceava in 2013

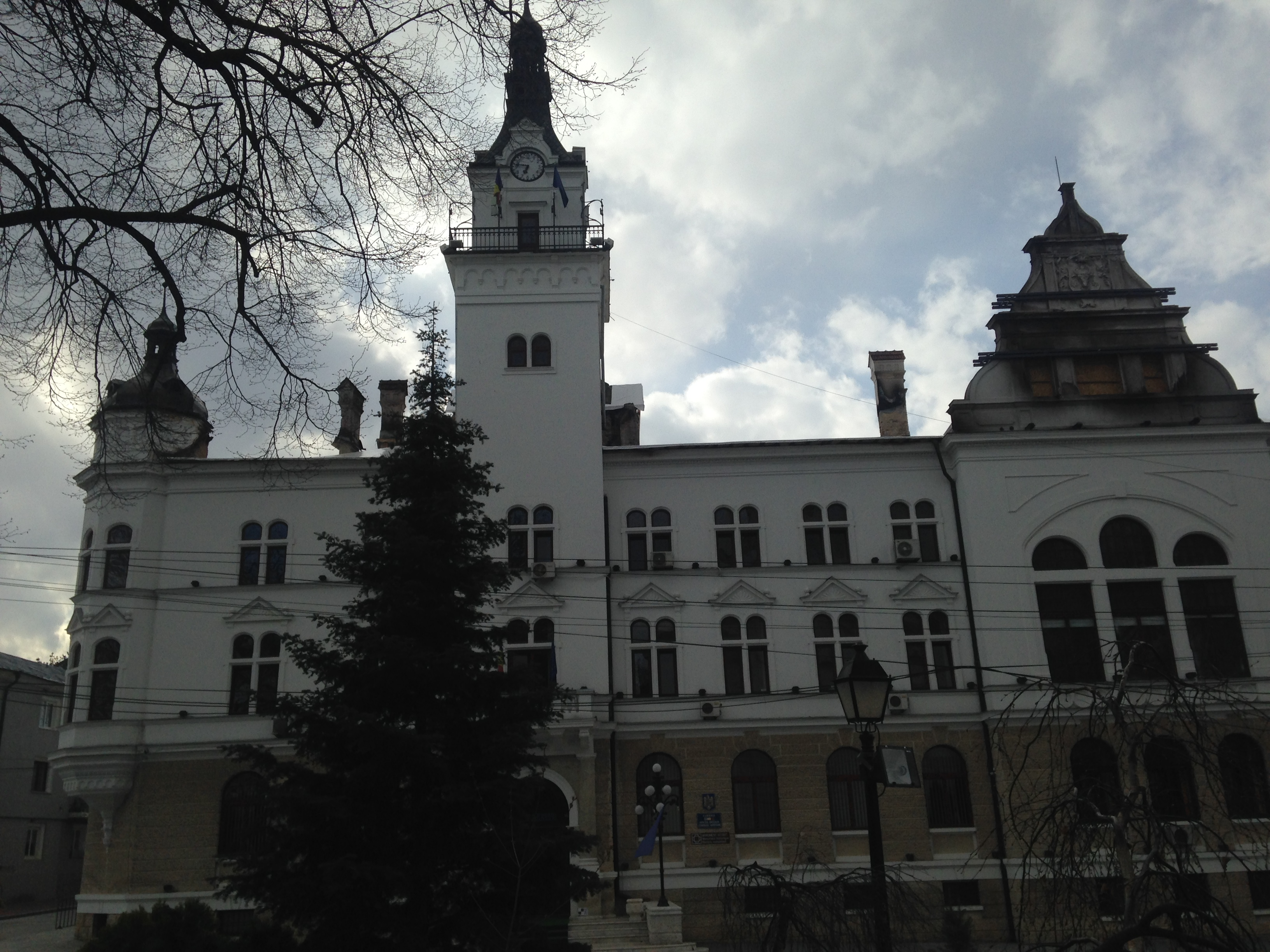
The Administrative Palace after the fire which swept its roof in March, 2021 (photographed here in April, 2021)

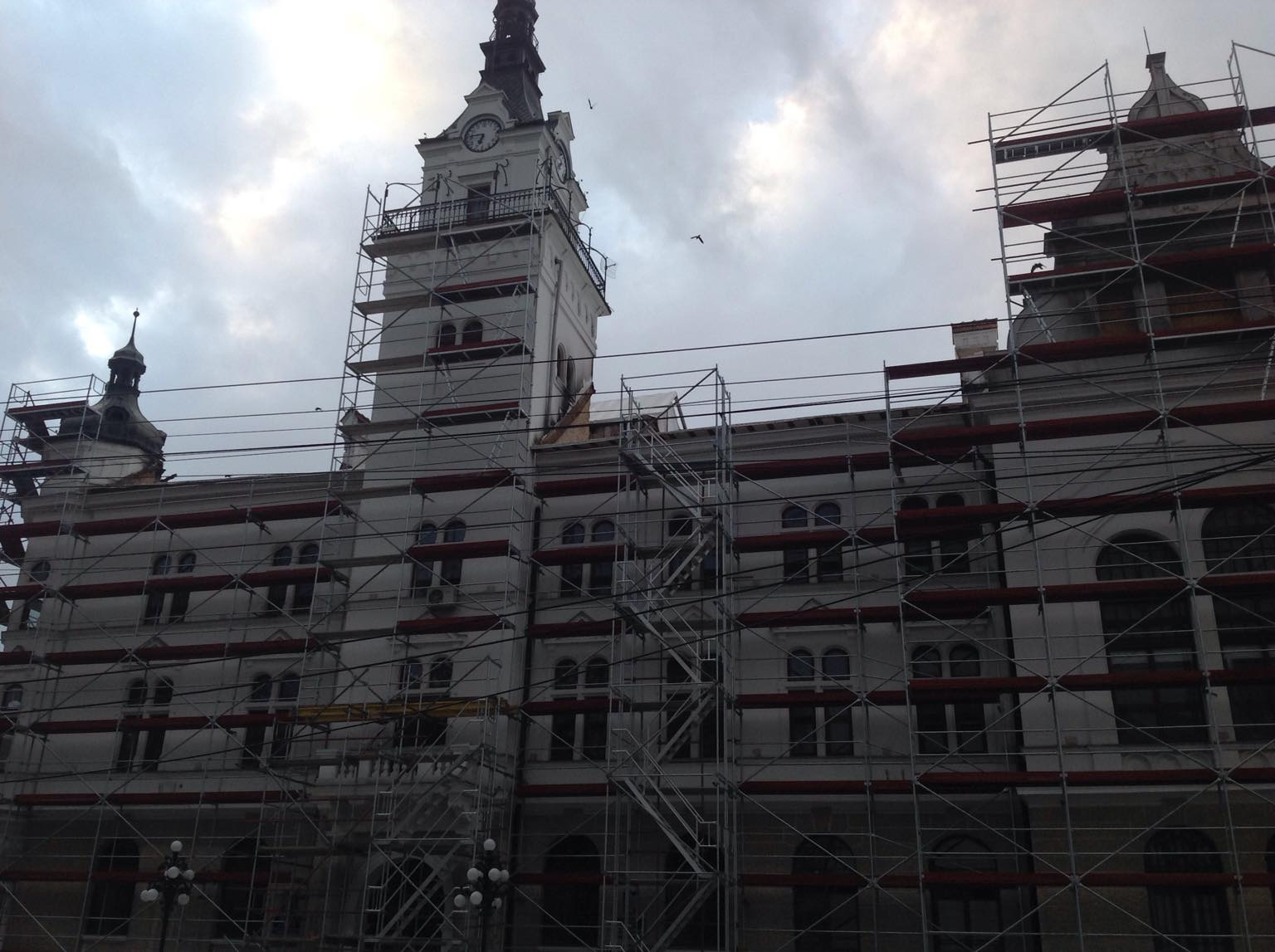
The Administrative Palace undergoing renovation (during early January 2023)

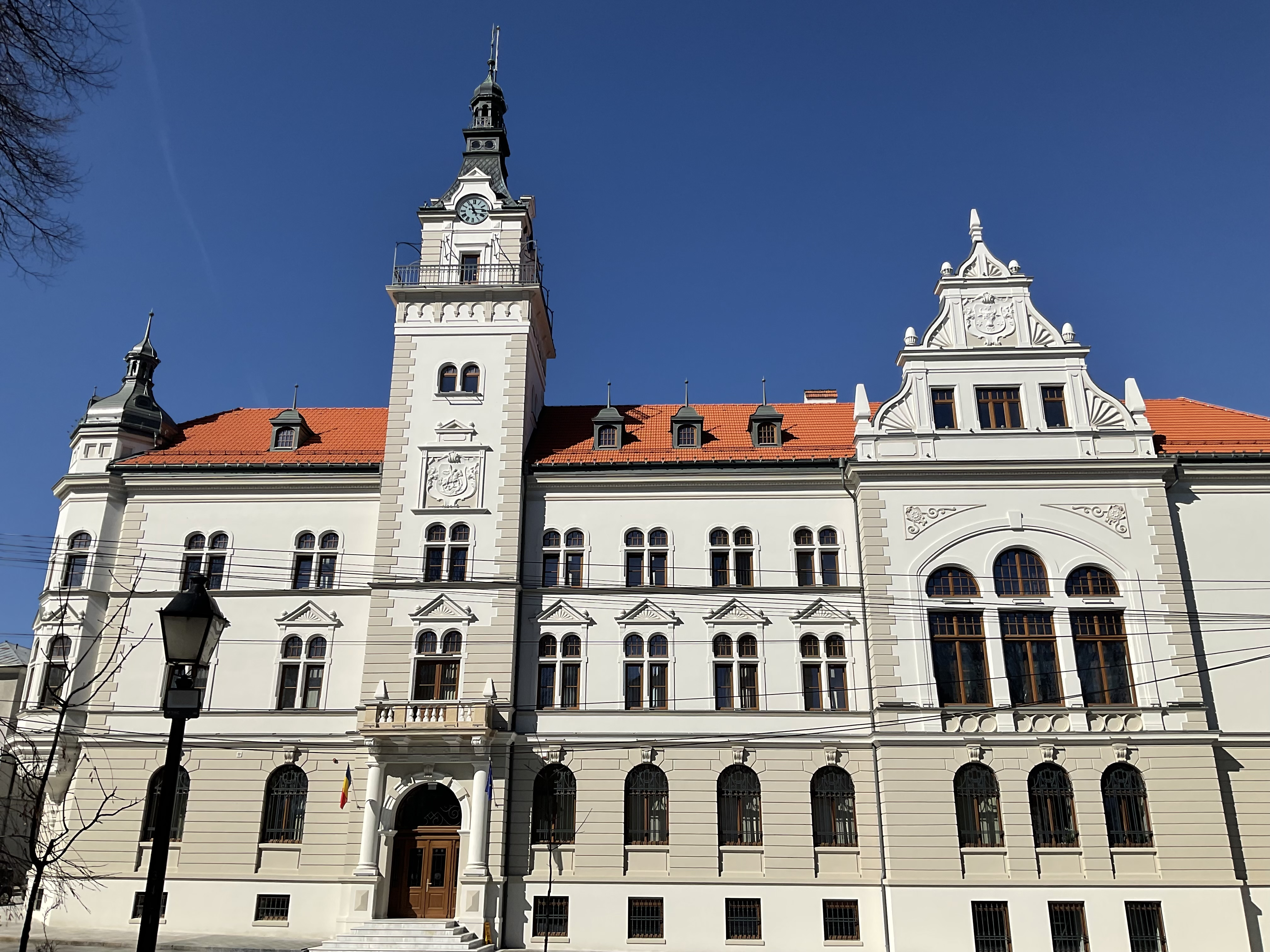
The Administrative Palace of Suceava (as seen in March, 2026)

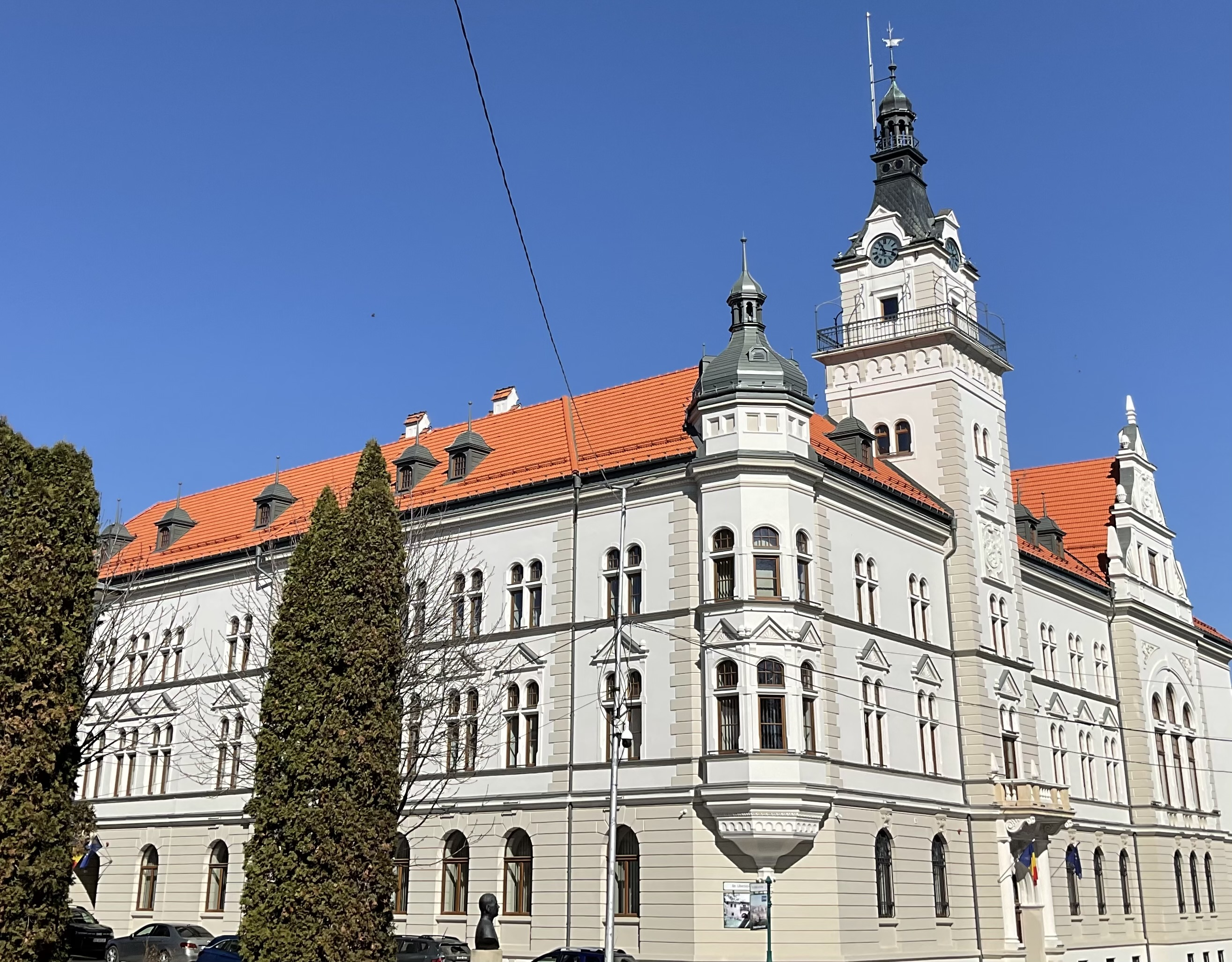
The Administrative Palace of Suceava (as seen in March, 2026)

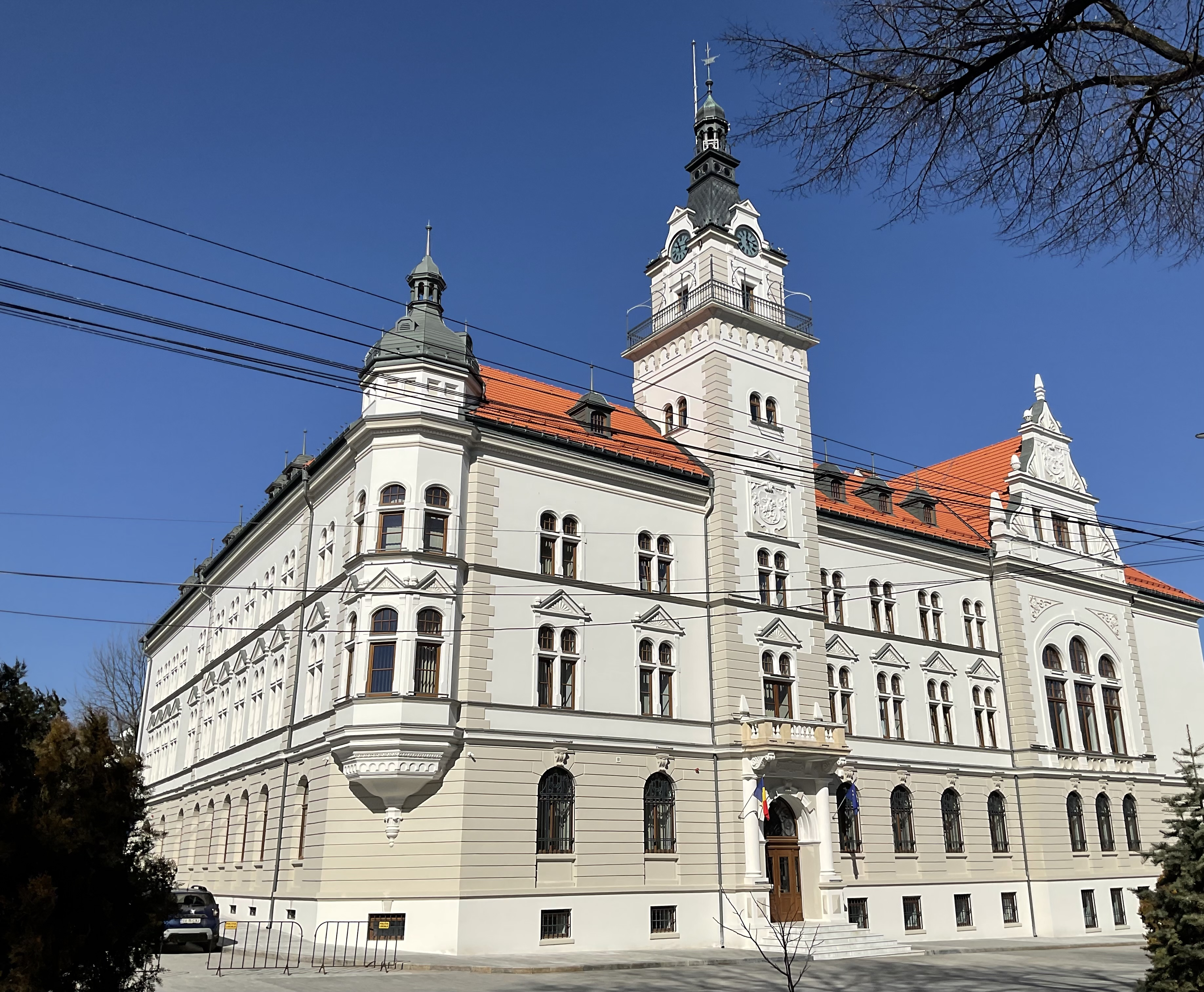
The Administrative Palace of Suceava (as seen in March, 2026)

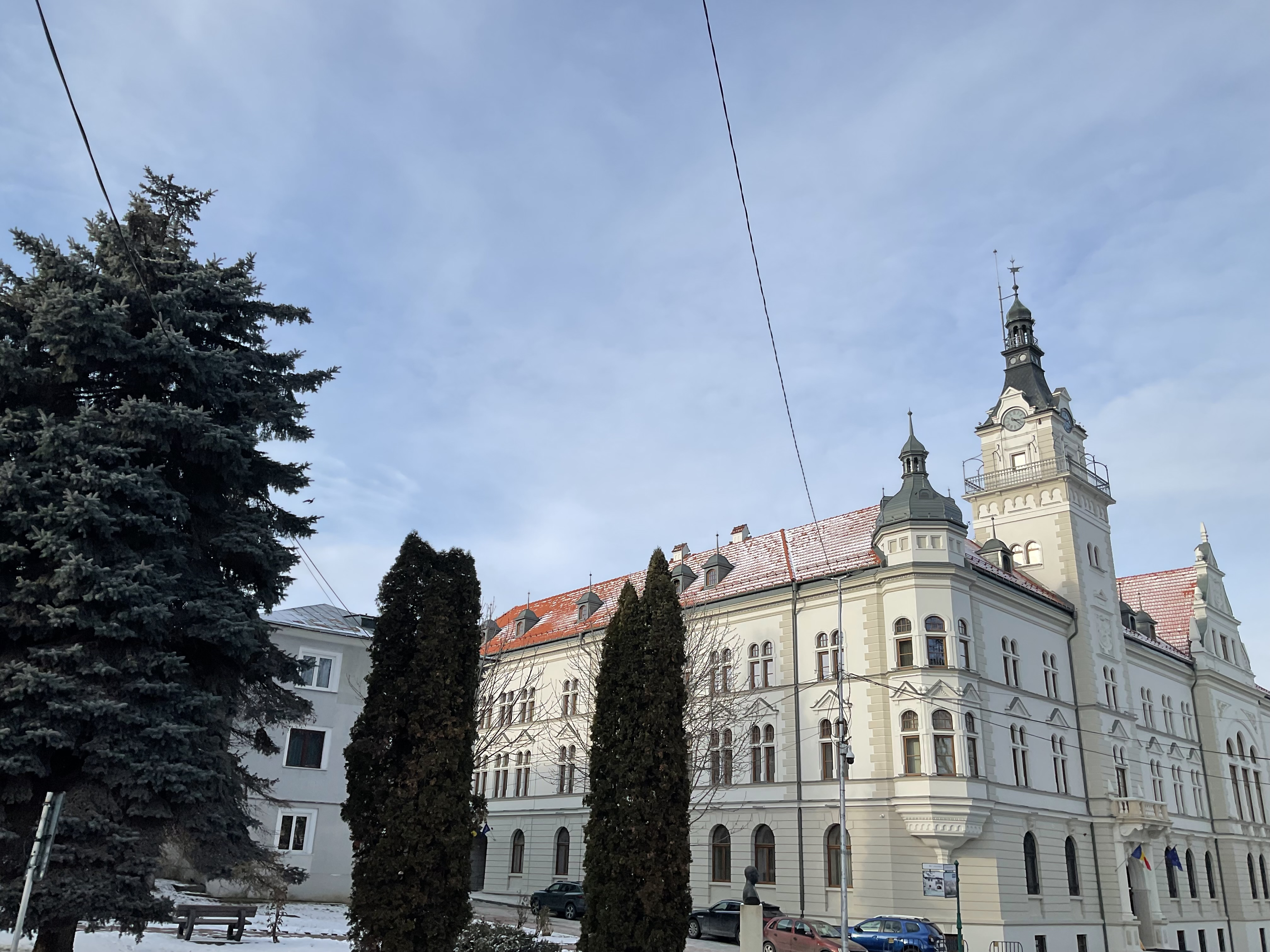
The Administrative Palace of Suceava (as seen in February, 2026)
