= Light bearer =

Light Bearer may refer to:

- Lucifer, called 'Light Bearer', as the Latin word lucifer meant "light-bringing"
- Luciferase, a generic term for the class of oxidative enzymes used in bioluminescence
- The Light Bearer, a 1994 novel by Donna Gillespie
- Phosphorus, etymologically derived from the Greek: φως = light, φέρω = carry, which roughly translates as "light-bringer"
- Light Bearers, a Seventh-day Adventist organization co-directed by David Asscherick
- Nick Lightbearer, a character from the game We Happy Few
- A user of the light, from Destiny (video game series)

== See also ==
- Lightbringer (disambiguation)
