= Peter Paul Brang =

Austrian architect

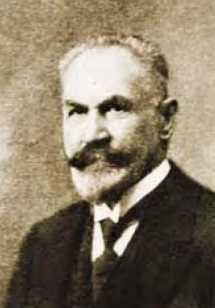
Peter Paul Brang

Peter Paul Brang (1852–1925) was a Viennese architect who worked in what are today the Czech Republic and Slovenia, as well as in Bulgaria and Romania.

Some of his works include the City Baths in Liberec (1901–1902) and Ústí nad Labem (1905–1908) in the Czech Republic, the Celje Hall (Celjski dom, Deutsches Haus) in Celje, Slovenia (1905–1906), Dohodno Zdanie in Rousse (1897–1900), the Dimitar Hadzhivasilev State High School of Commerce in Svishtov (1895), the Italian (former Austrian) embassy (1883) and what is today the BNP Paribas headquarters on 2 Tsar Osvoboditel Boulevard in Sofia (1885), the Evanghelical Gymnasium Bistritz (Bistriţa) (1896–1908), the Vatra Dornei Casino (1898) and the Administrative Palace in Suceava, Romania (1903–1904).

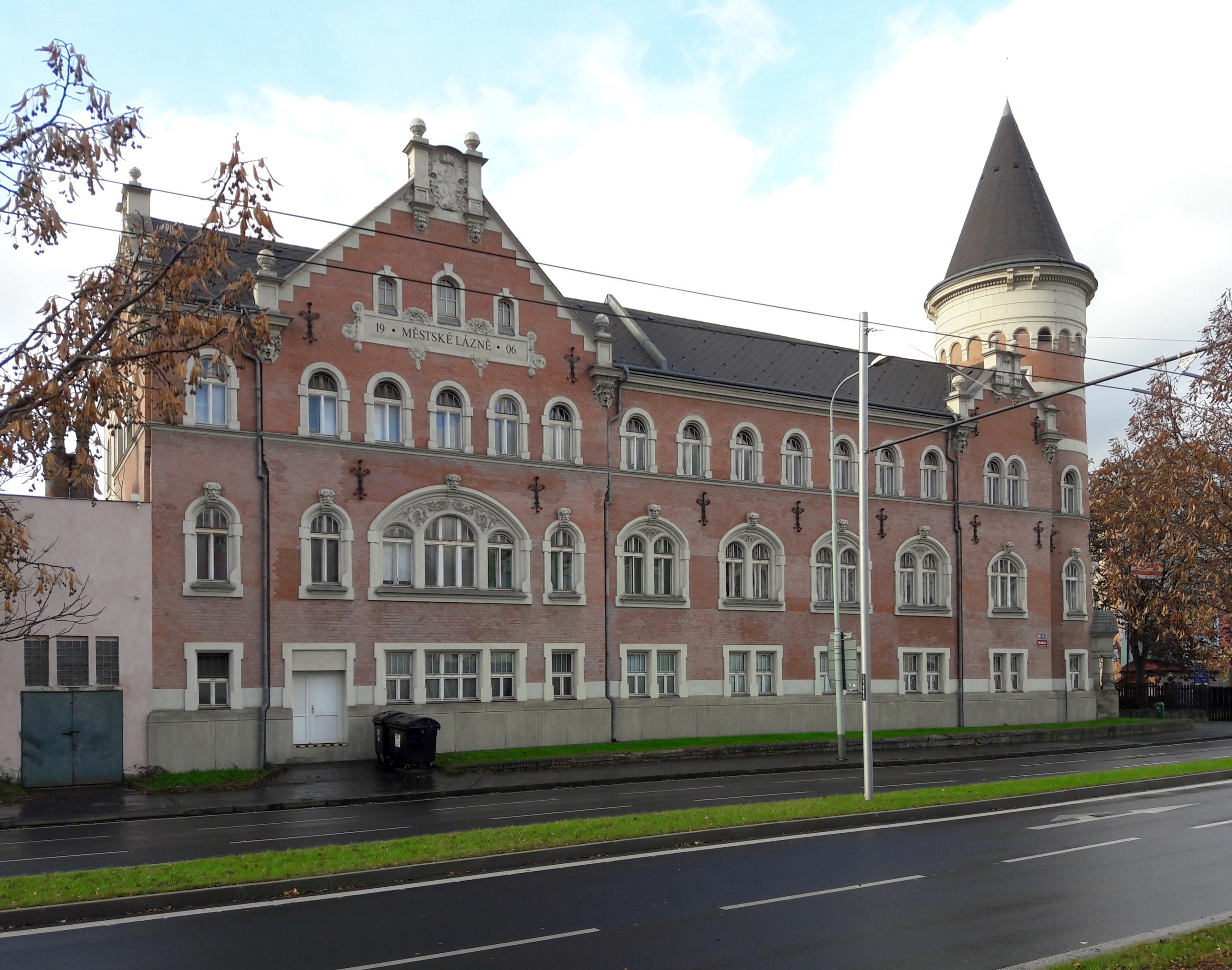
Městské lázně, Ústí nad Labem (1905–1908)

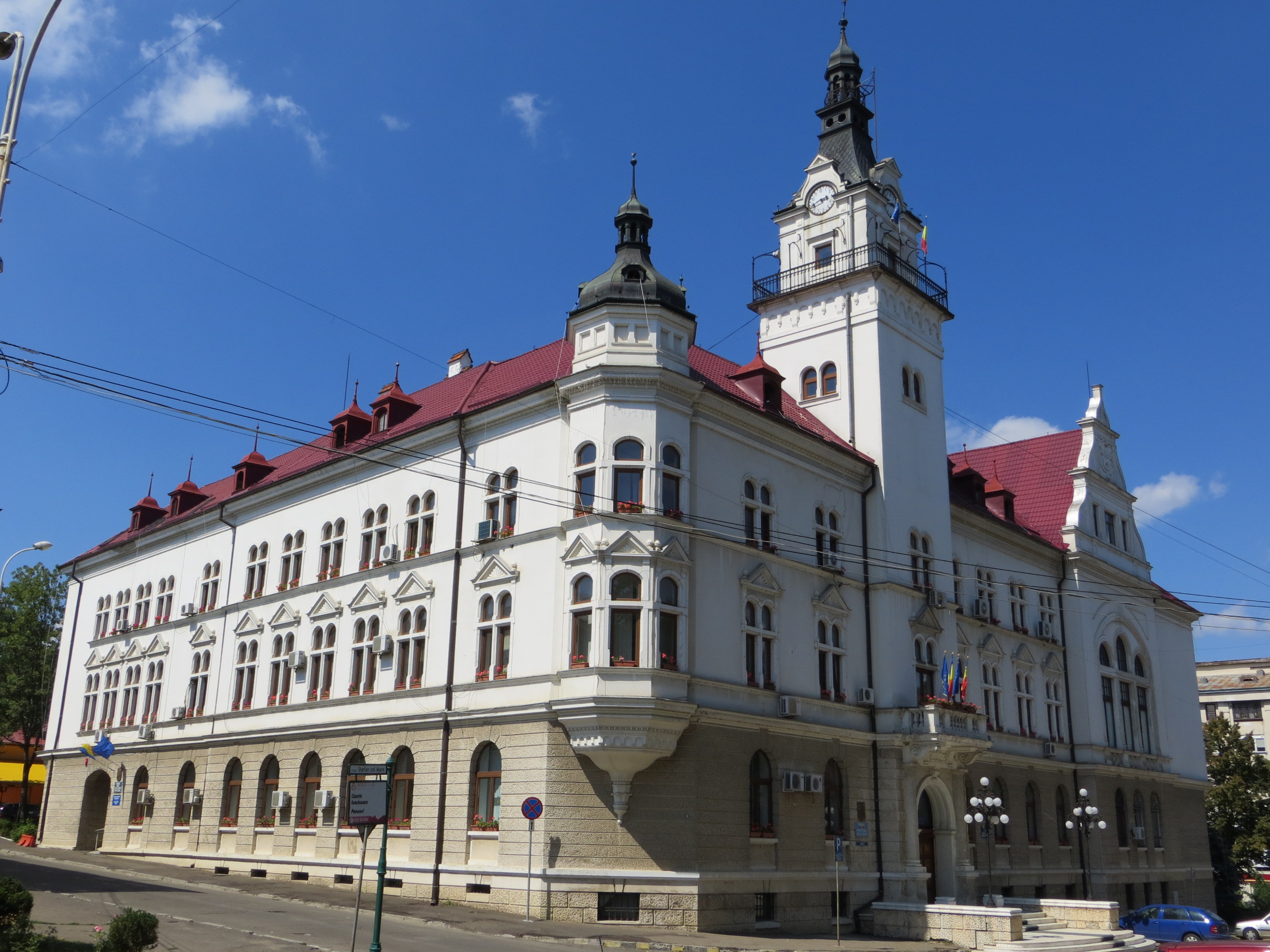
Administrative Palace, Suceava (1903–1904)

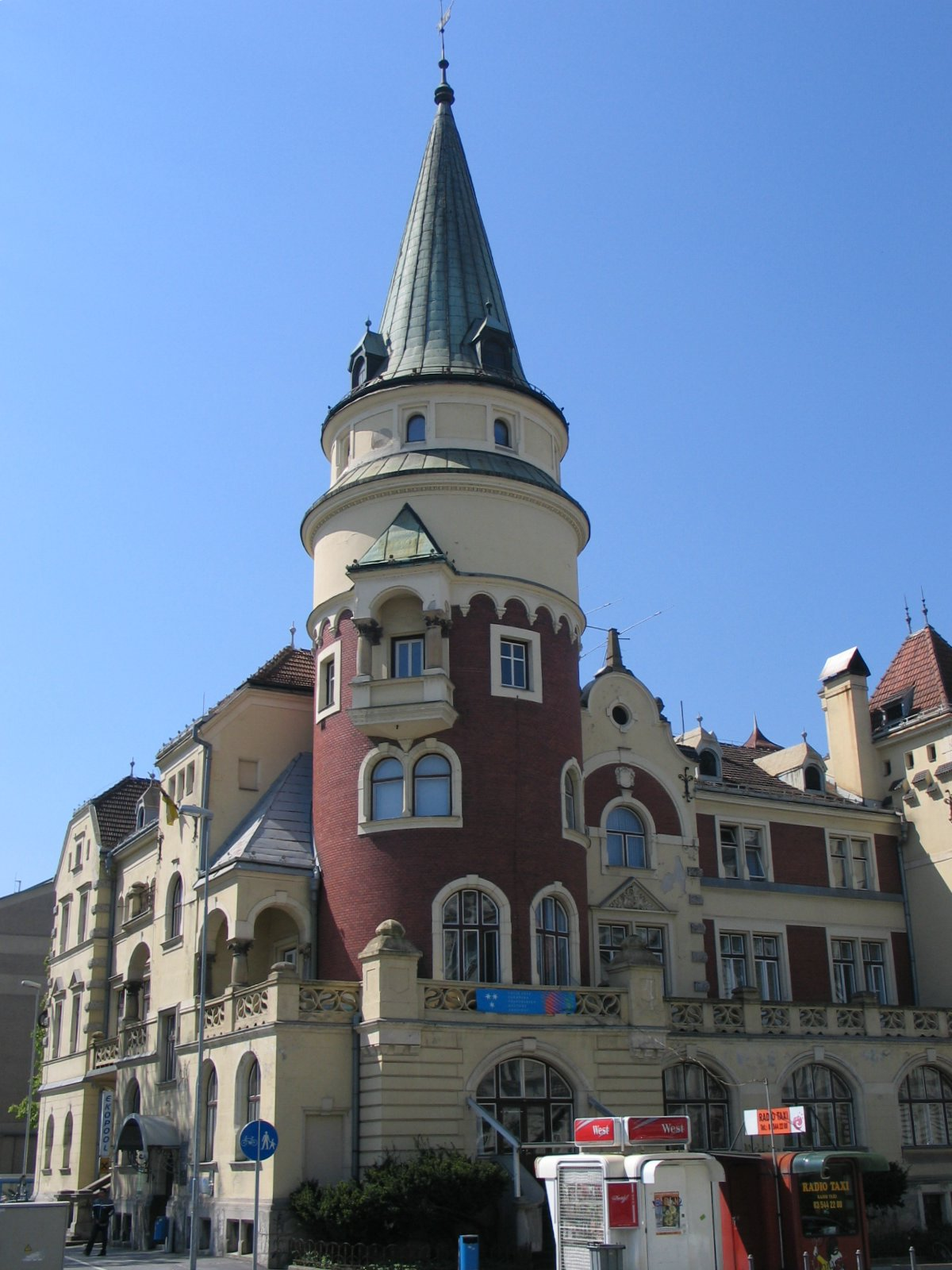
Celje Hall (Celjski dom, Deutsches Haus), Celje (1905–1906)

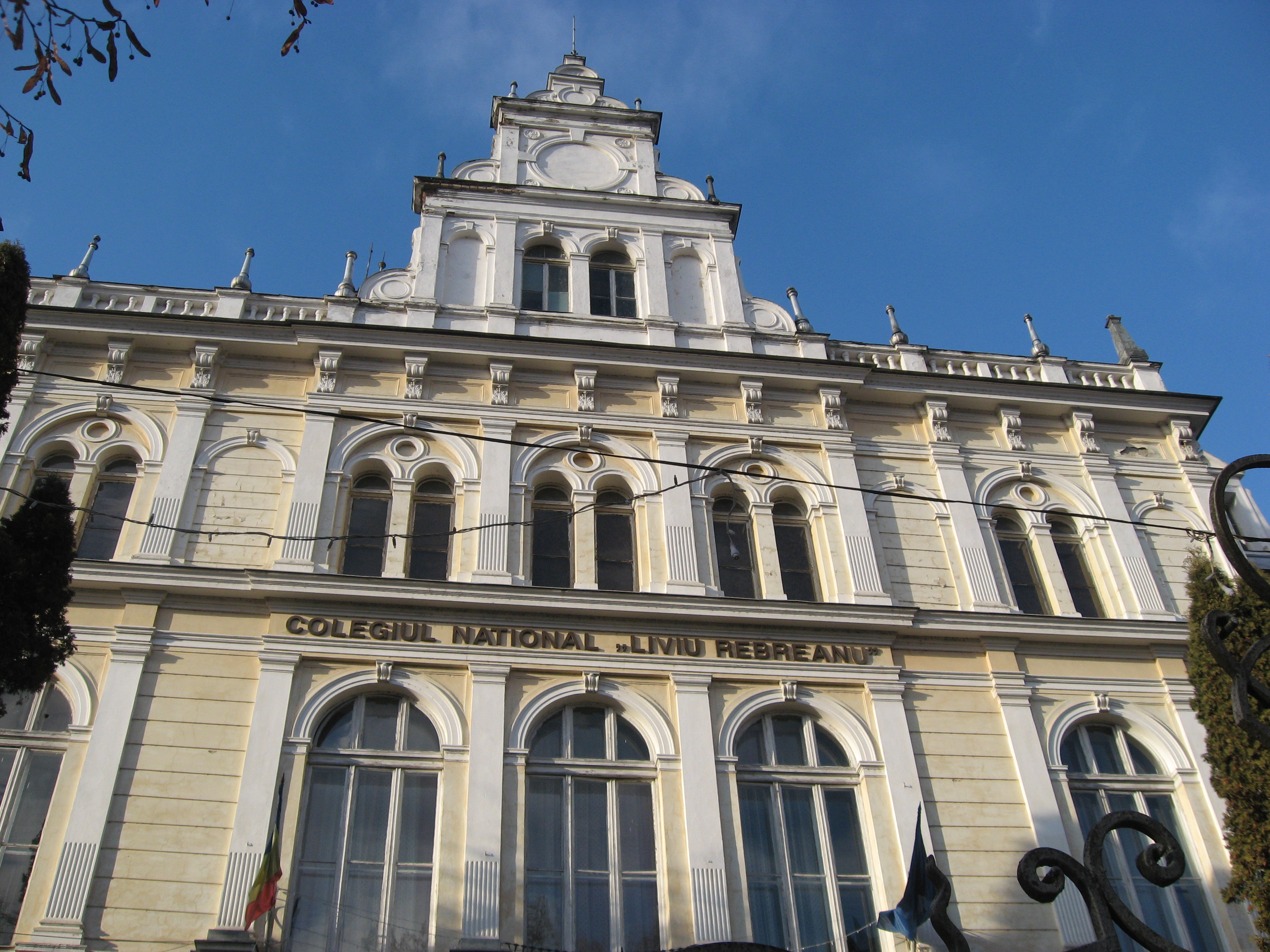
Liviu Rebreanu National College, Bistriţa (1896–1911)

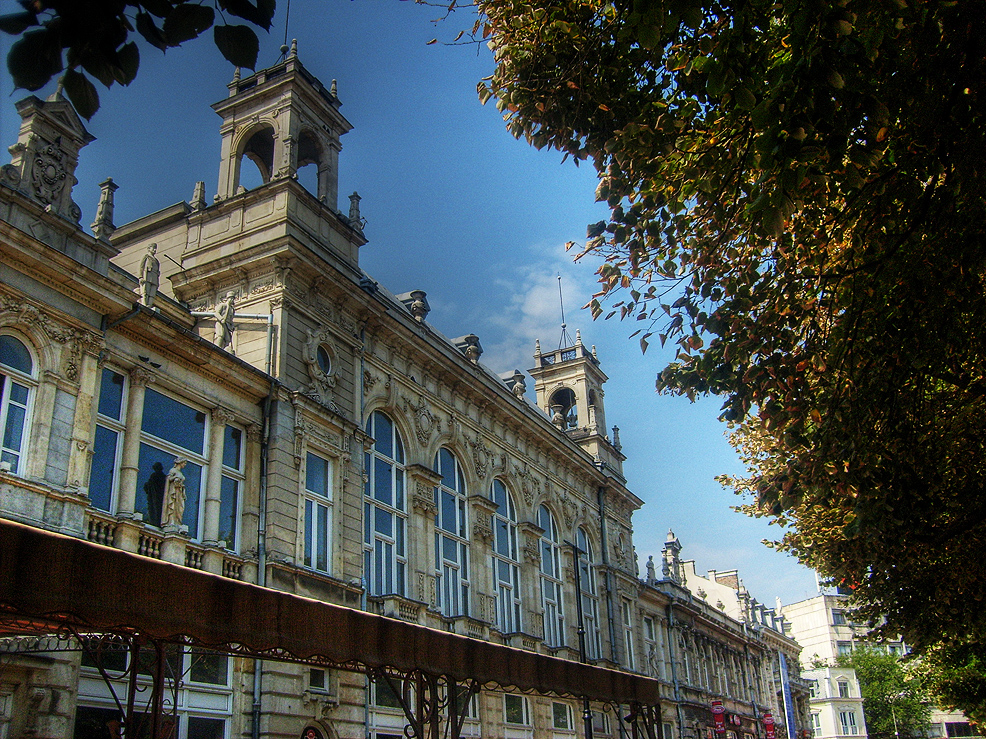
Dohodno Zdanie, Rousse (1898-1902)

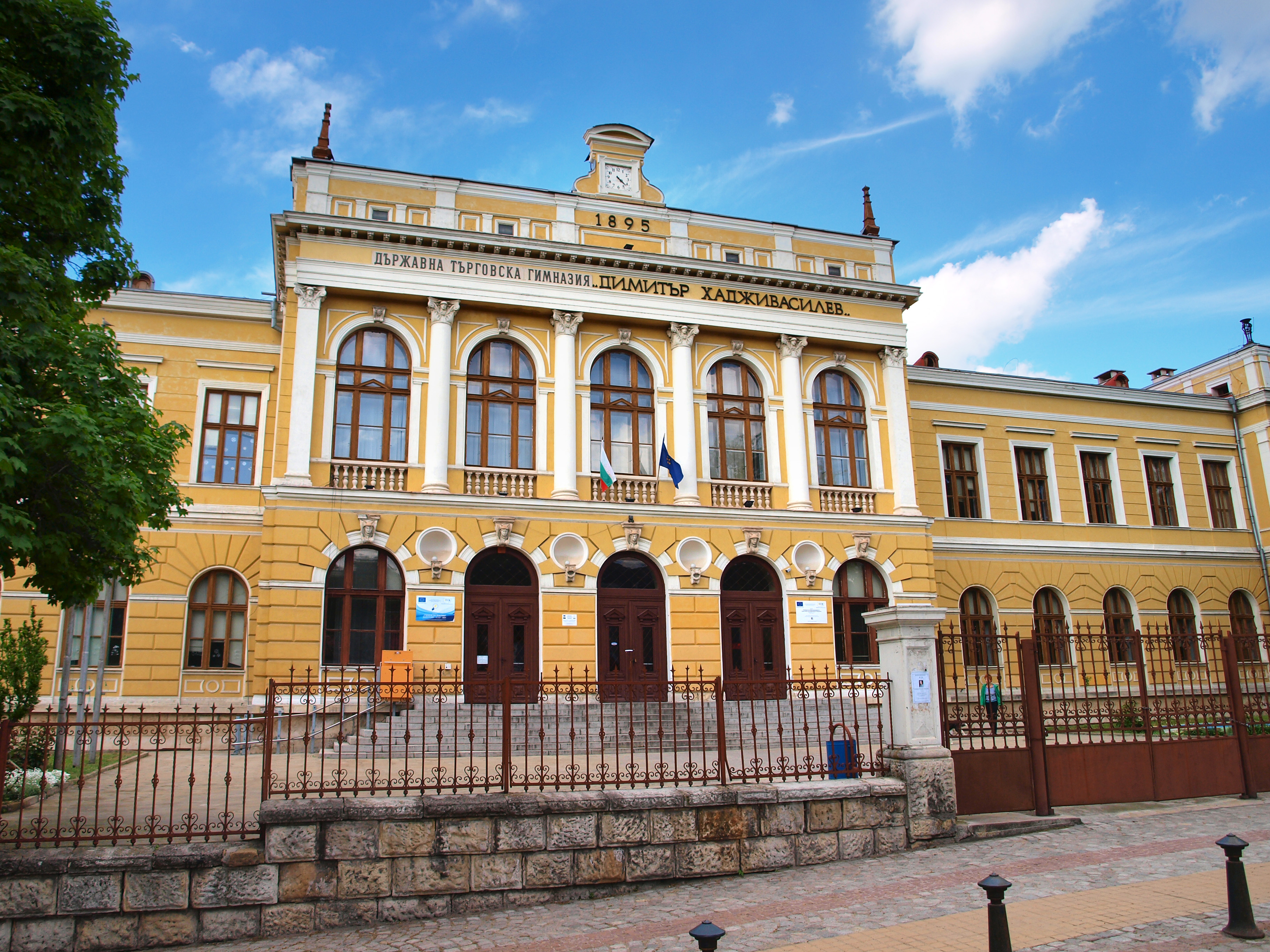
Dimitar Hadzhivasilev State High School of Commerce, Svishtov (1895)

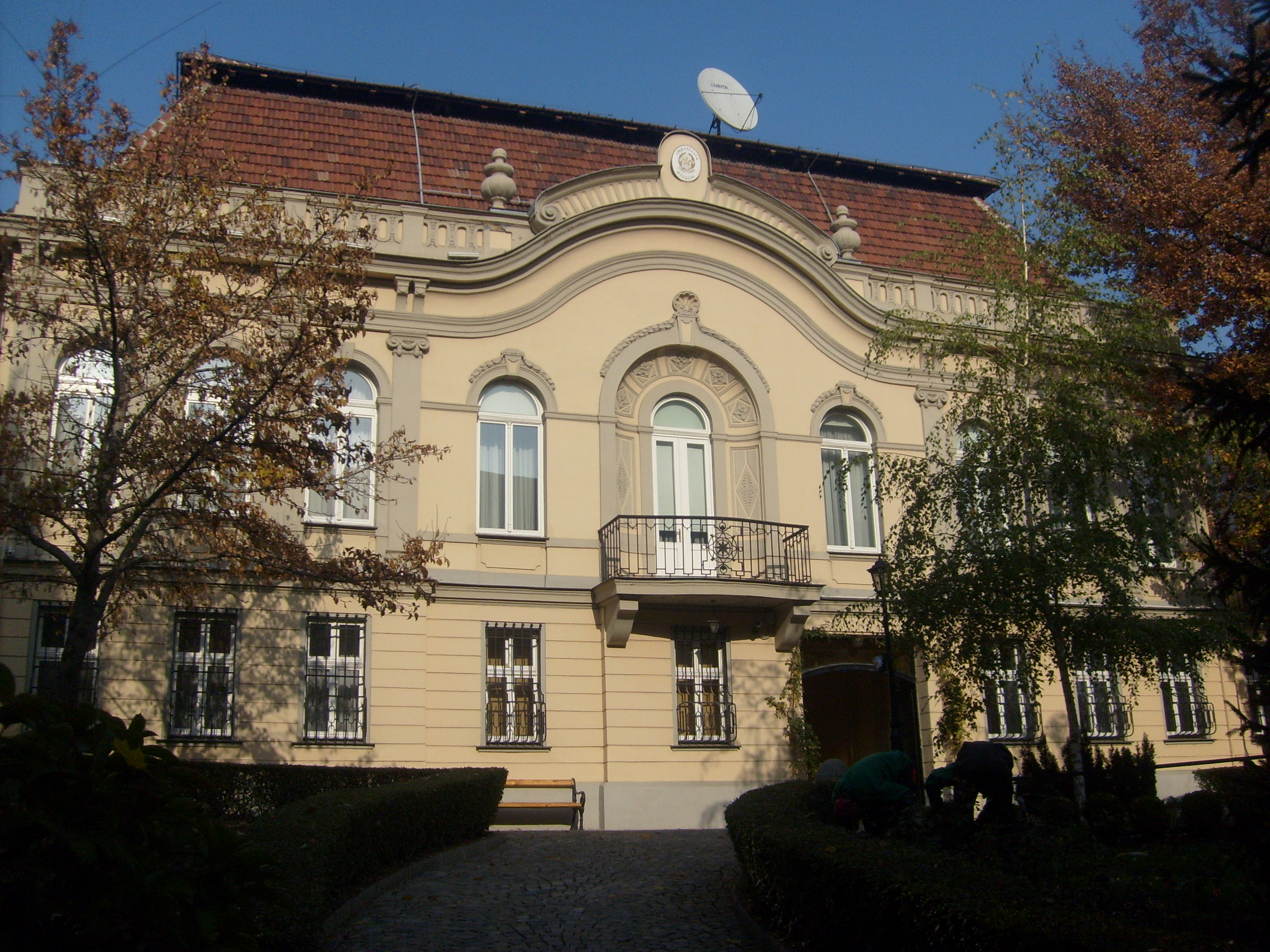
Italian embassy, Sofia (1883)

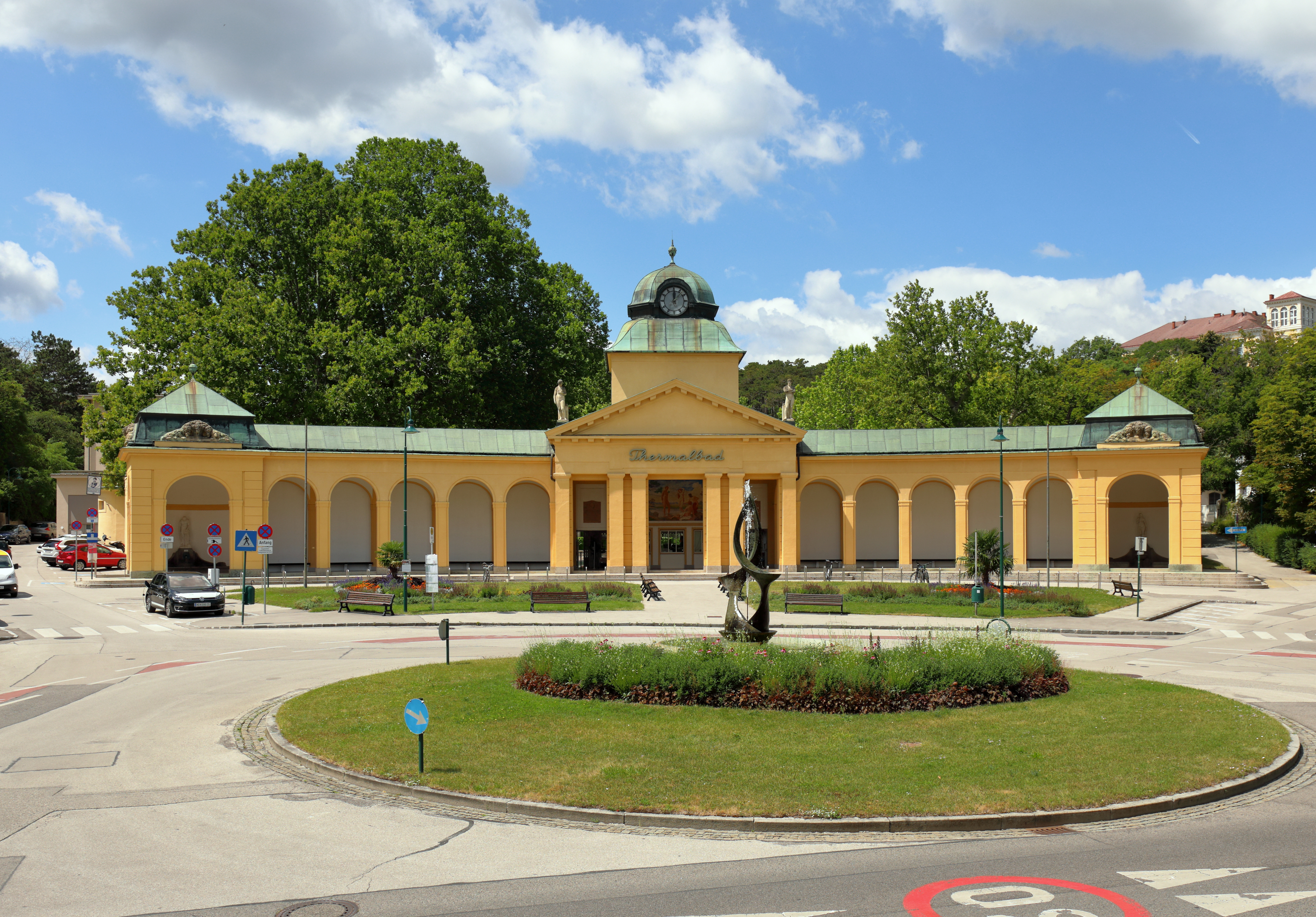
Themalbad in Bad Vöslau (1925–1926)
