= Dohodno Zdanie =

Coordinates: 43°50′53″N 25°57′10″E

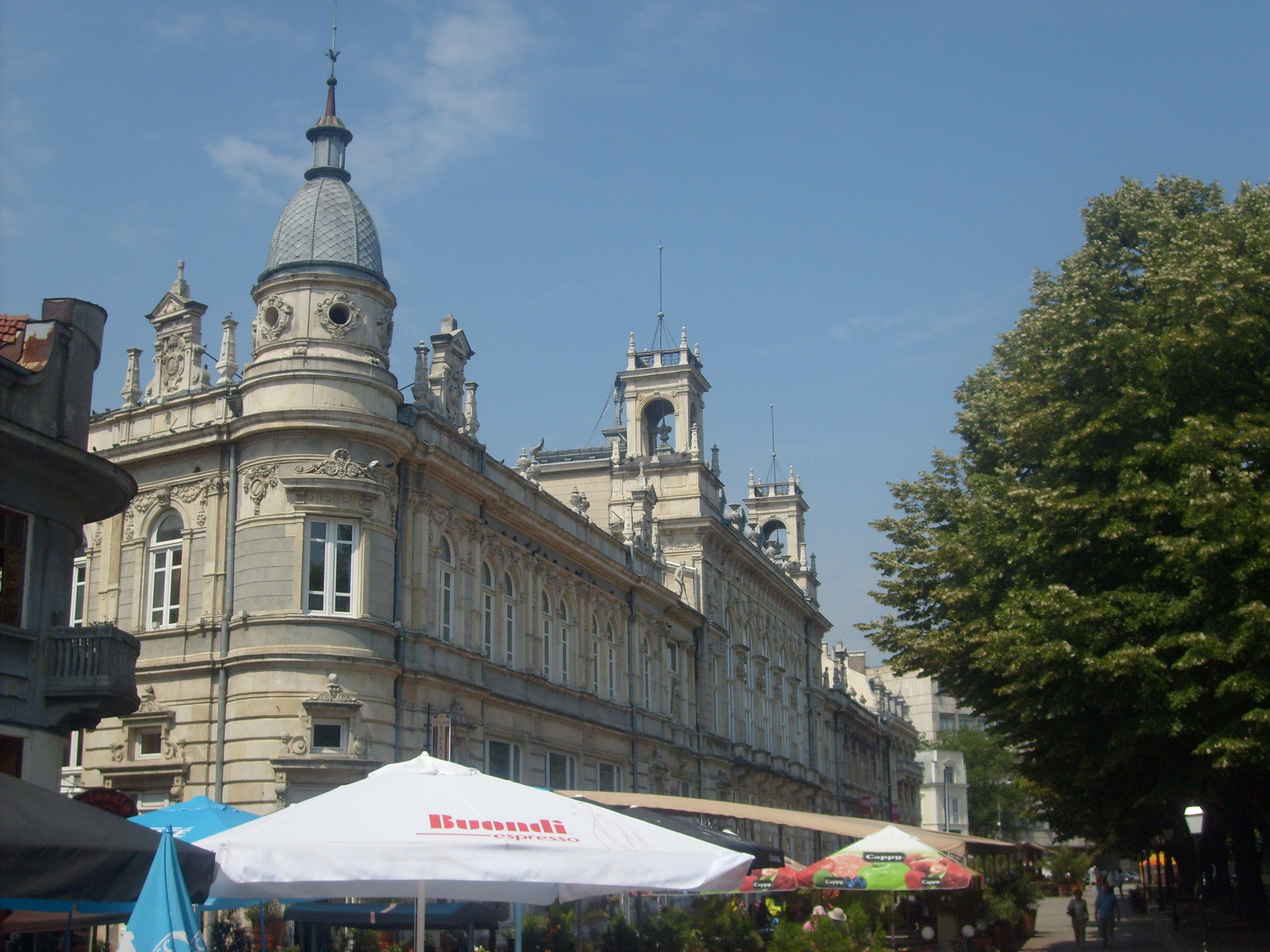
Dohodno Zdanie building

Dohodno Zdanie (Bulgarian: Доходно здание; literally: "profitable building") is an imposing Neoclassical edifice on Freedom Square in the city centre of Rousse, Bulgaria, built in 1898–1902 to accommodate the local theatre performances. The name originates from the construction's purpose: to provide the school board of trustees with funds by means of the theatre hall, library, casino and shop rents. Today, Dohodno Zdanie is a cultural monument and one of the symbols of Rousse.

A six-member city commission accepted the requirements that the project for the building should be completed in 1896. Those included no less than nine shops, two storeys, a 200 square metre casino, a 300 square metre theatre hall and a 200 square metre library hall. An authoritative jury discussed 15 projects that participated in a contest for the construction of the building, and chose the Voilà une idée project by Austrian architect Peter Paul Brang on 20 February 1897. An auction on 26 January 1898 determined the construction contractors, Gatyu Tsonev and Petar Atanasov. The construction manager on behalf of the Rousse municipality was Georg Lang (because the architect offered unfavourable conditions), while on behalf of the contractors the manager was Frank Scholz.

The construction of the building met severe financial problems due to the increase of the initial costs of 350,000 leva, the school board of trustees was forced to borrow an initial 200,000 and then a further 50,000 from the Stremlenie company, mortgaging its own property, and then conclude another loan agreement with Girdap Bank for 600,000 leva. The municipality mortgaged its cattle butchering receipts and the school board of trustees— its shops and Dohodno Zdanie itself.

The sculptures symbolizing agriculture and war, designed by the initial architect Raul-Paul Brank, were not approved due to being seemingly too German in appearance, and were remodelled and made more Bulgarian by T. Petkov. The theatre hall project was created by arts teacher Truniček and Joran Romeo, a decorating specialist who had also worked with the Romanian National Theatre Bucharest.

Due to the lack of funds to finalize the construction, the school board of trustees had to loan the middle part of Dohodno Zdanie, the theatre hall and the coffeehouse, before the building was actually completed. Three auctions were organized between July 1899 and March 1900, but no candidates were found.

The building was deemed finished in 1900, but the theatre hall was incomplete. The first theatre performance took place in the casino hall in 1901, until the scene and theatre hall were ultimately completed in 1902.

The scene was expanded in 1921, and an additional storey of it was built in 1924. It was considerably repaired in 1933–1934. The restoration of the entire building began in 1970 and lasted until 15 December 2006.

== Gallery ==
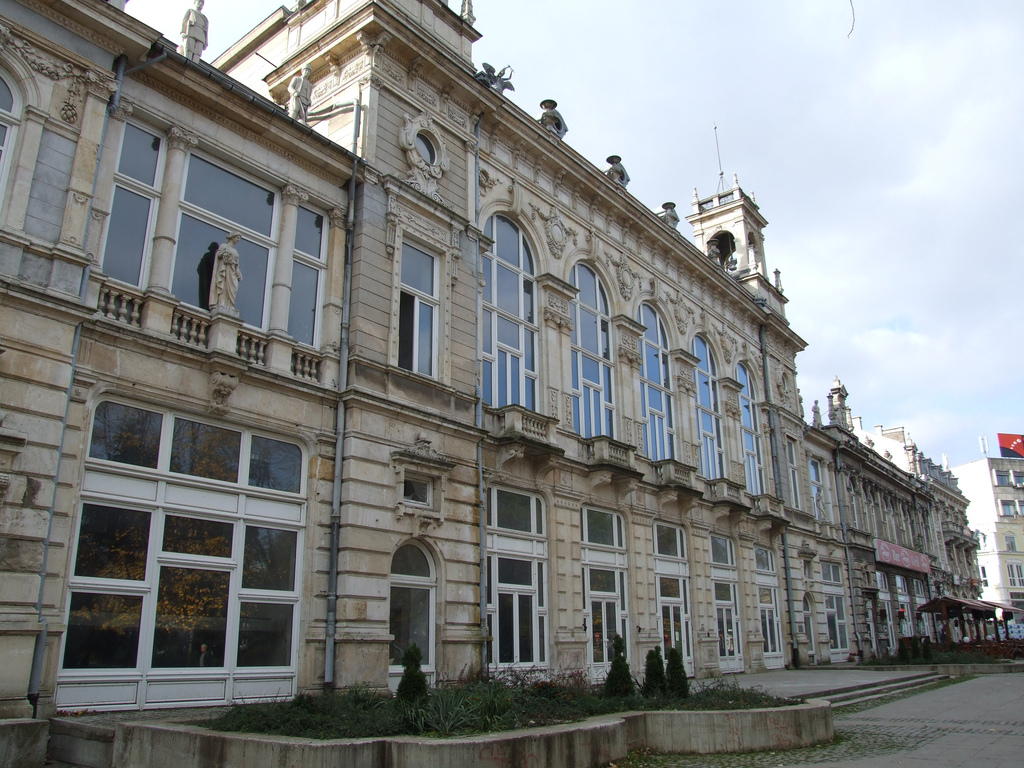
Another view

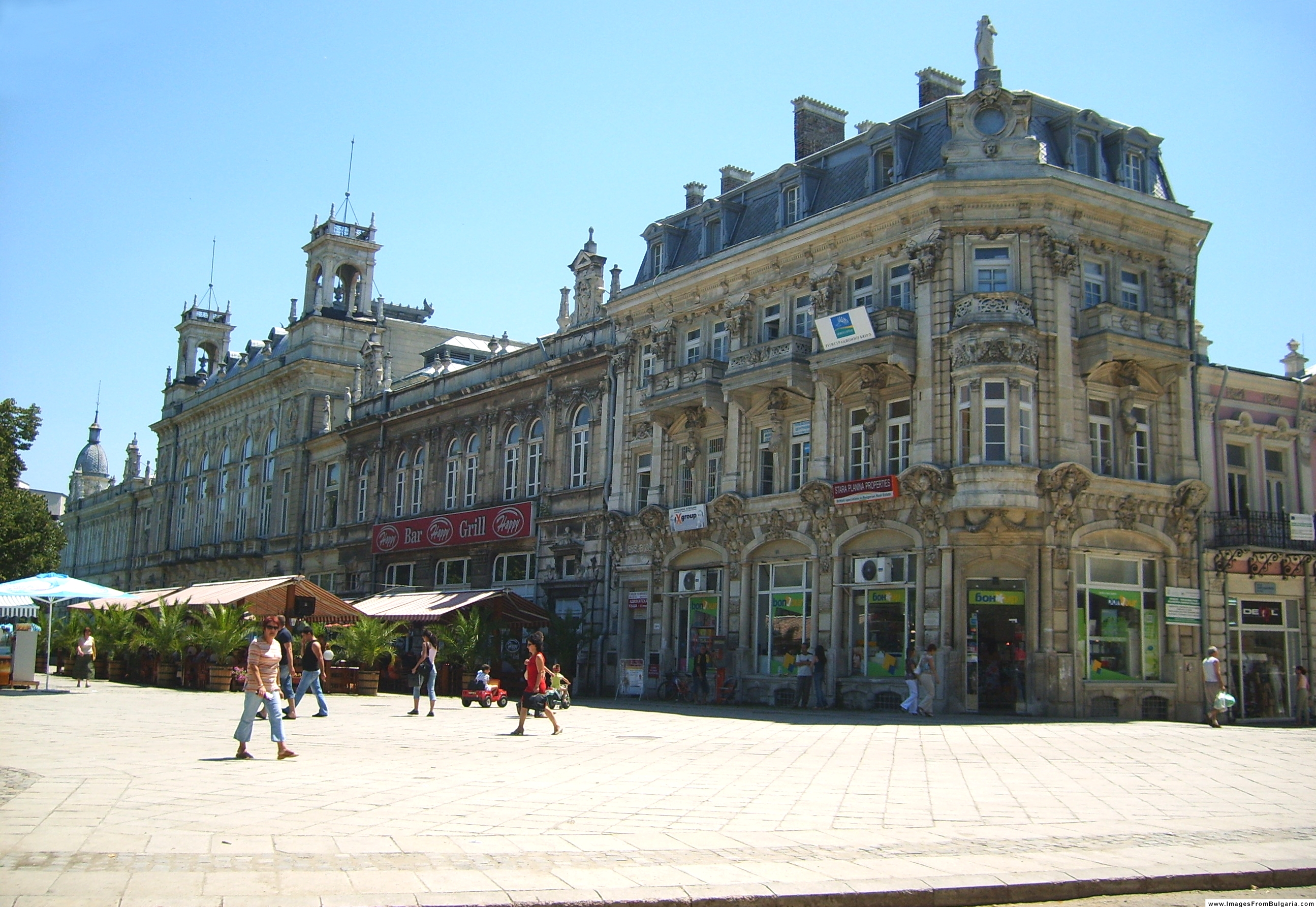
Another view

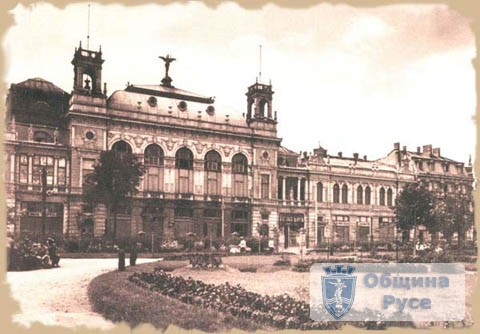
An old photo

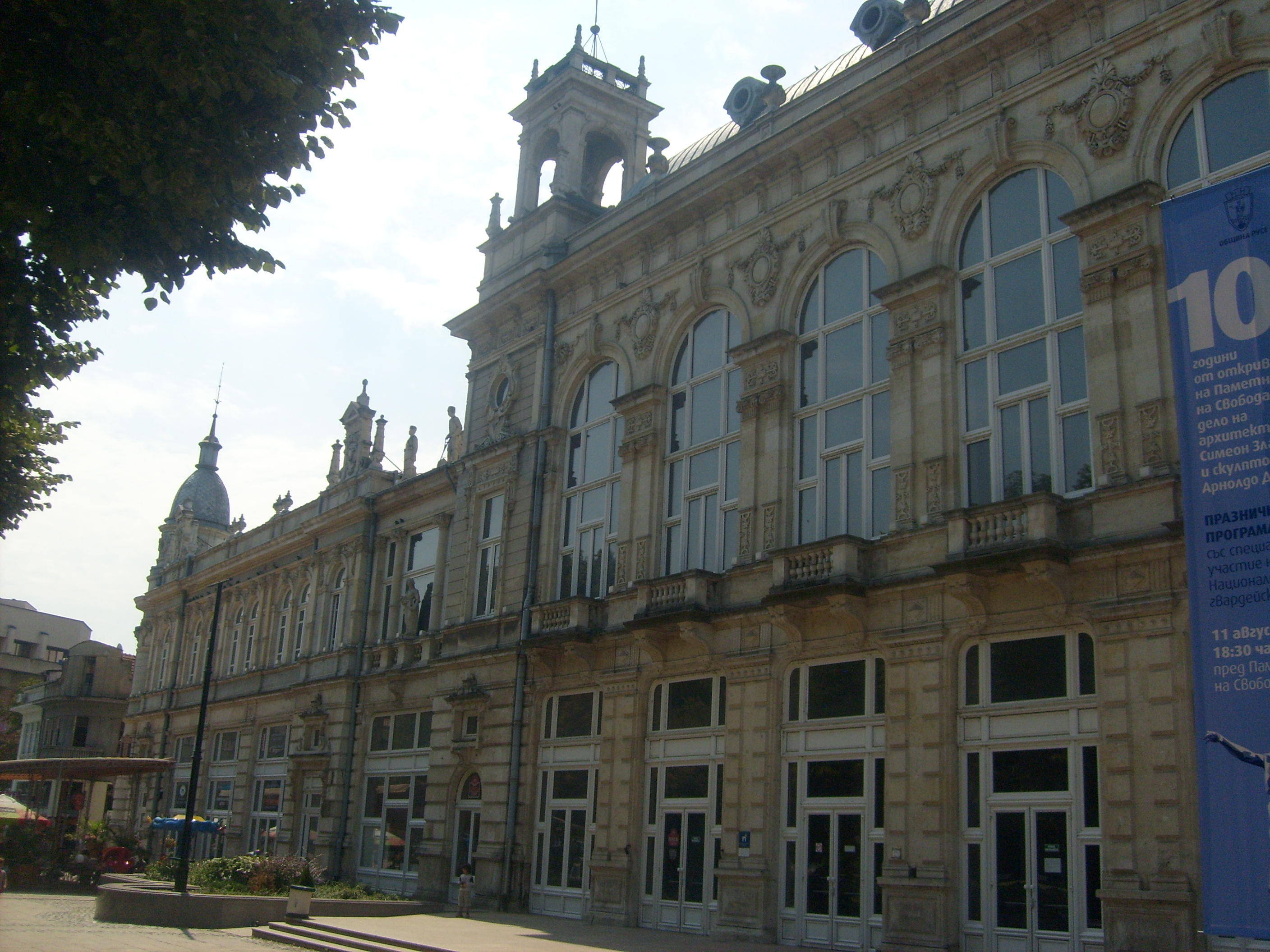
Another view

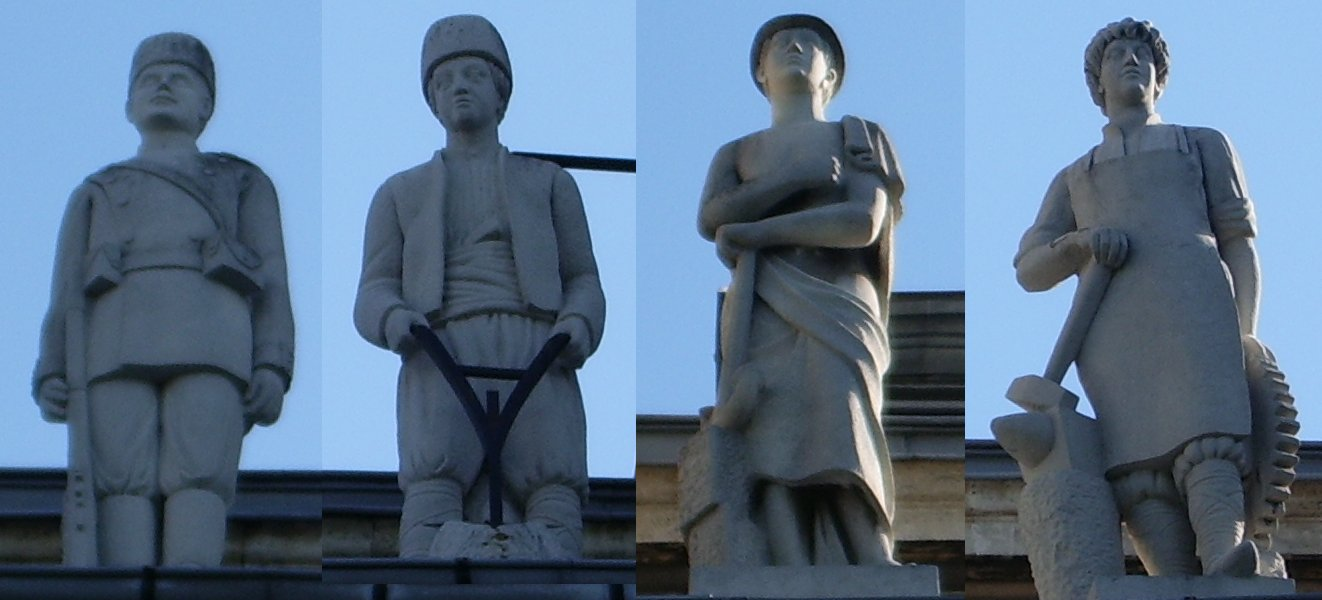
Statues representing crafts

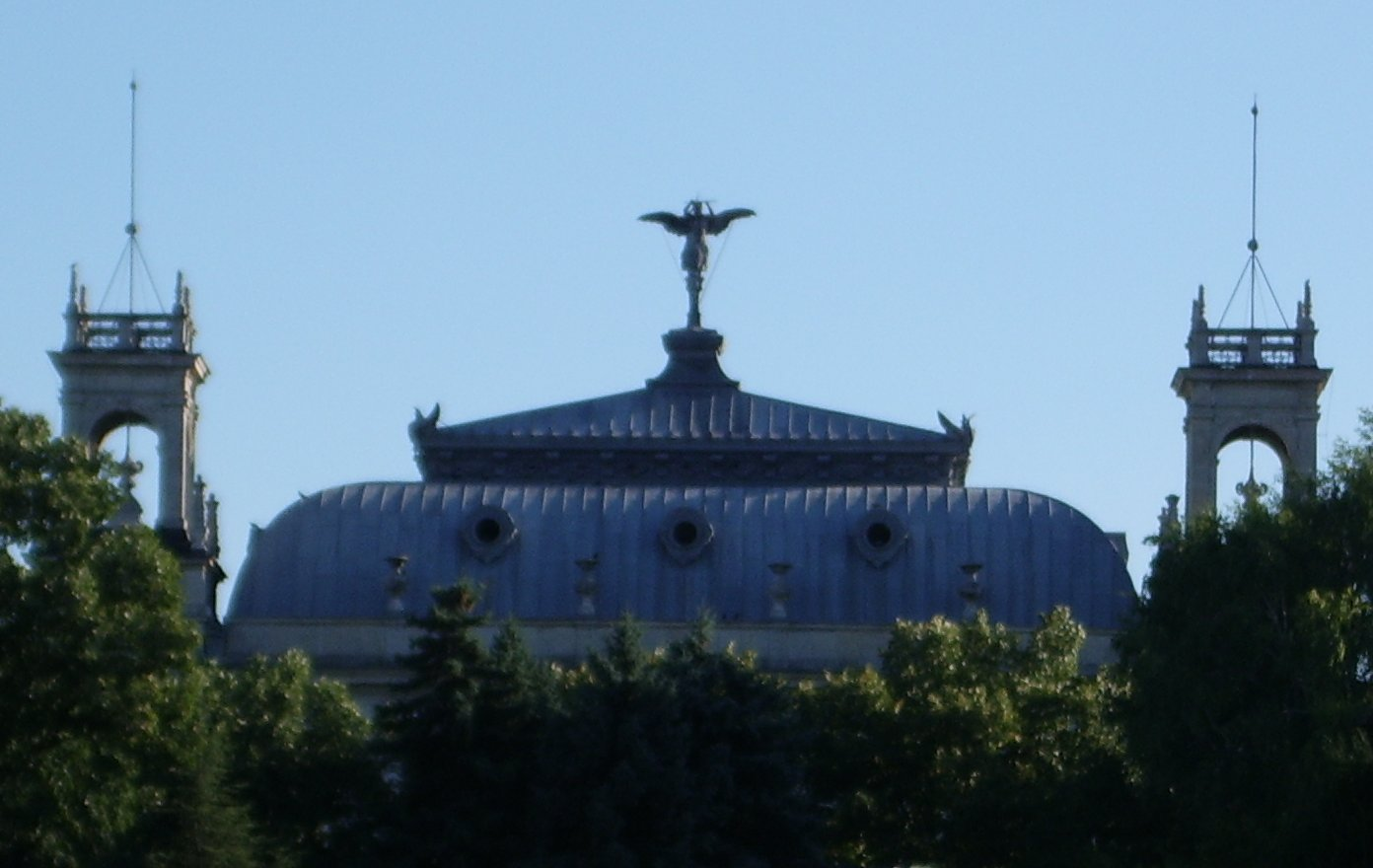
Dohodno Zdanie skyline

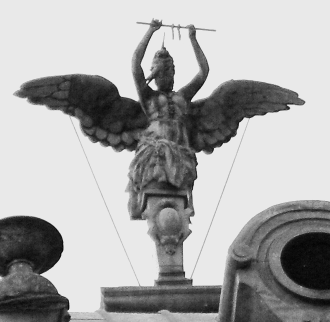
The winged Mercury at the top

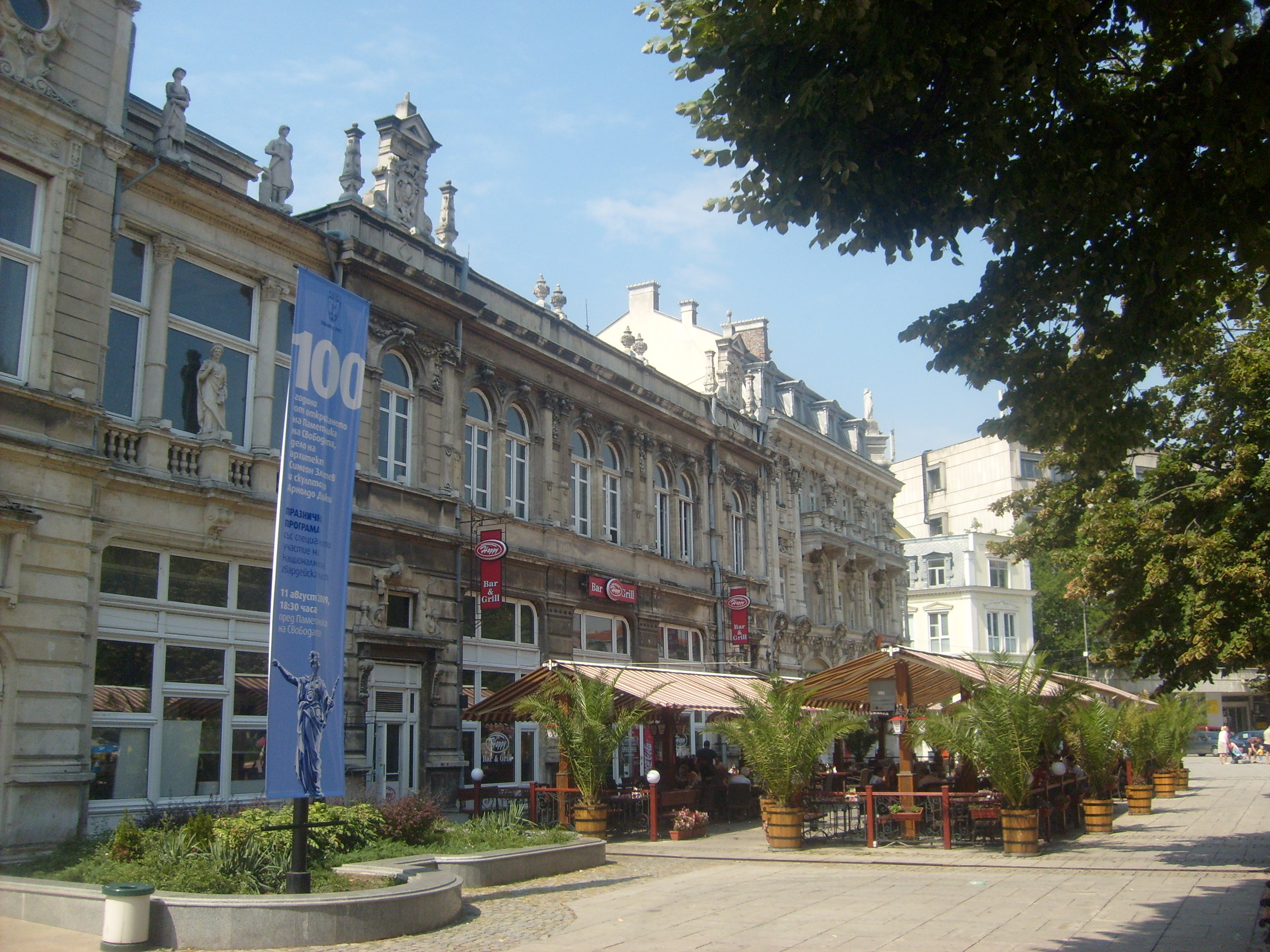

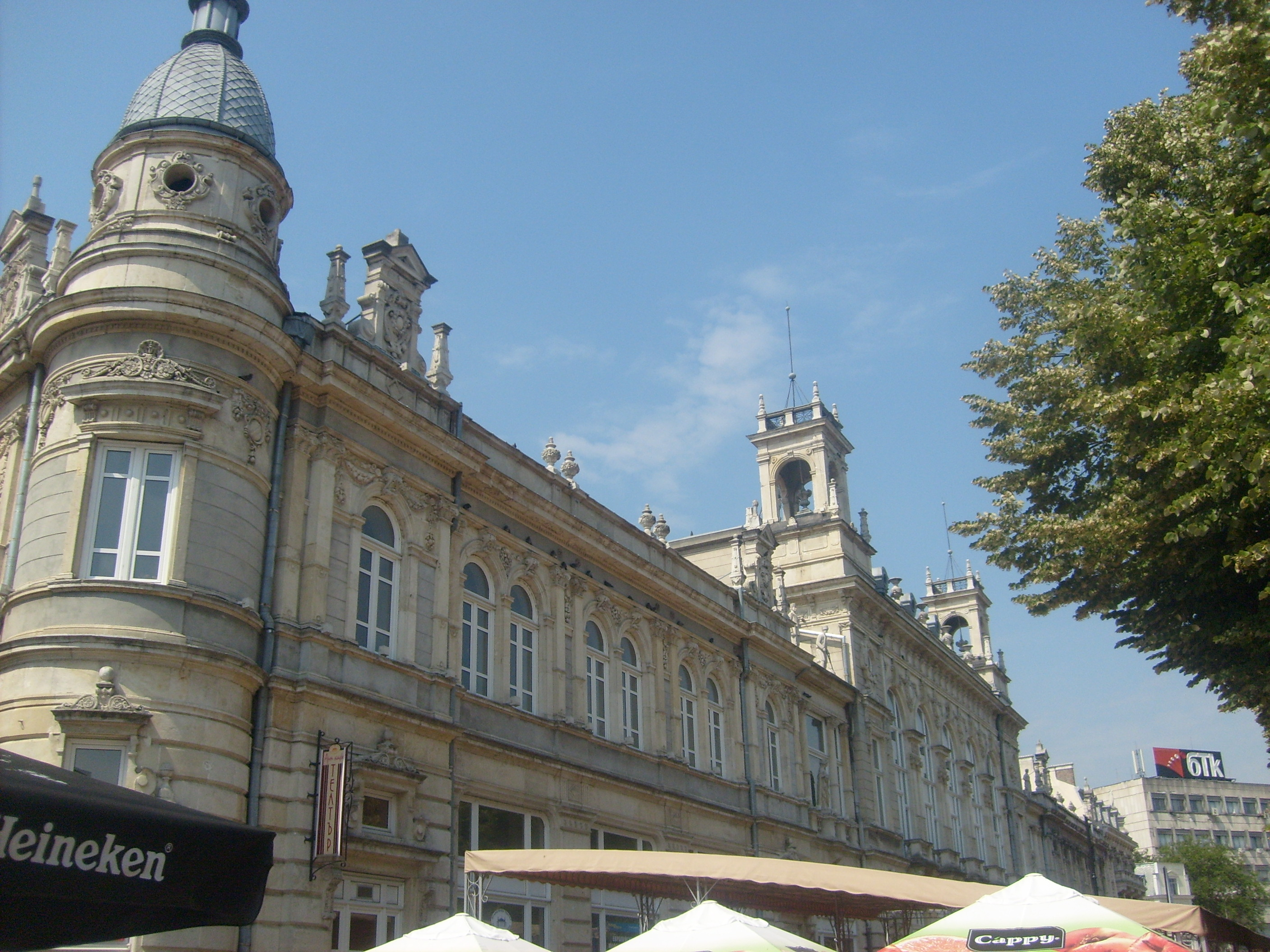

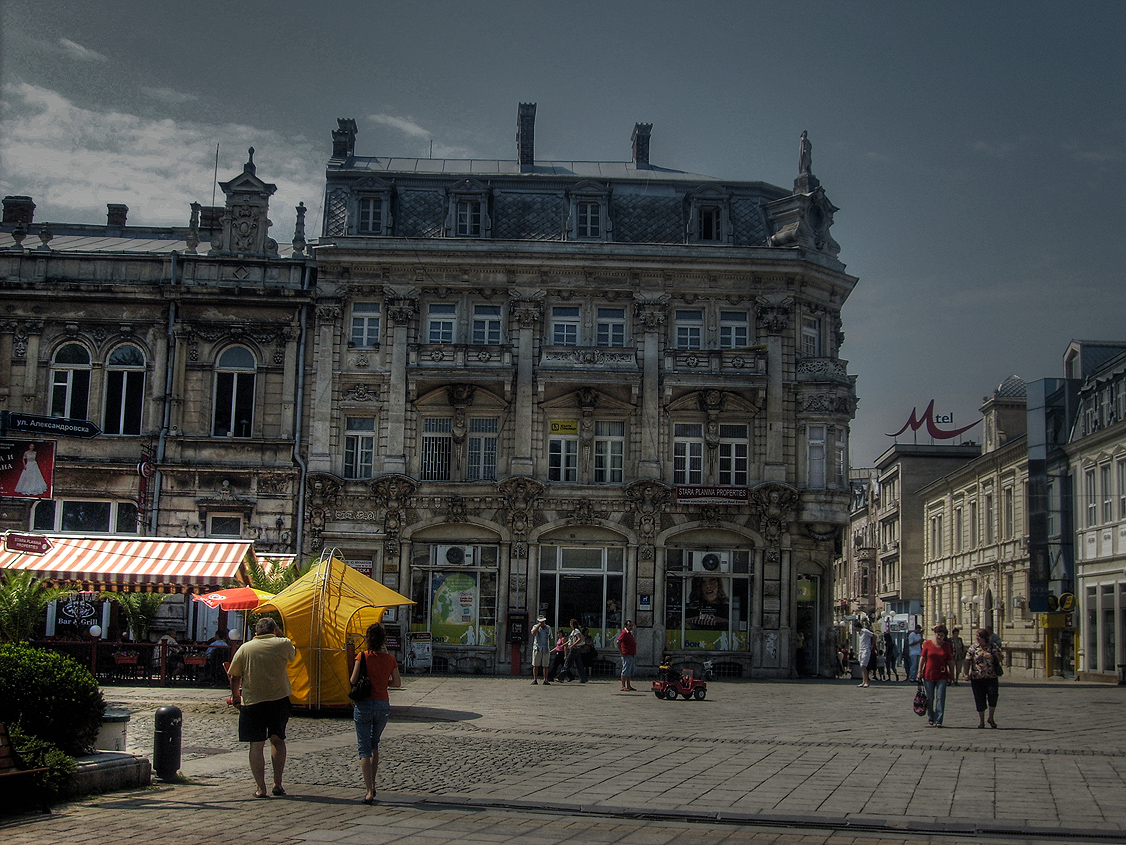

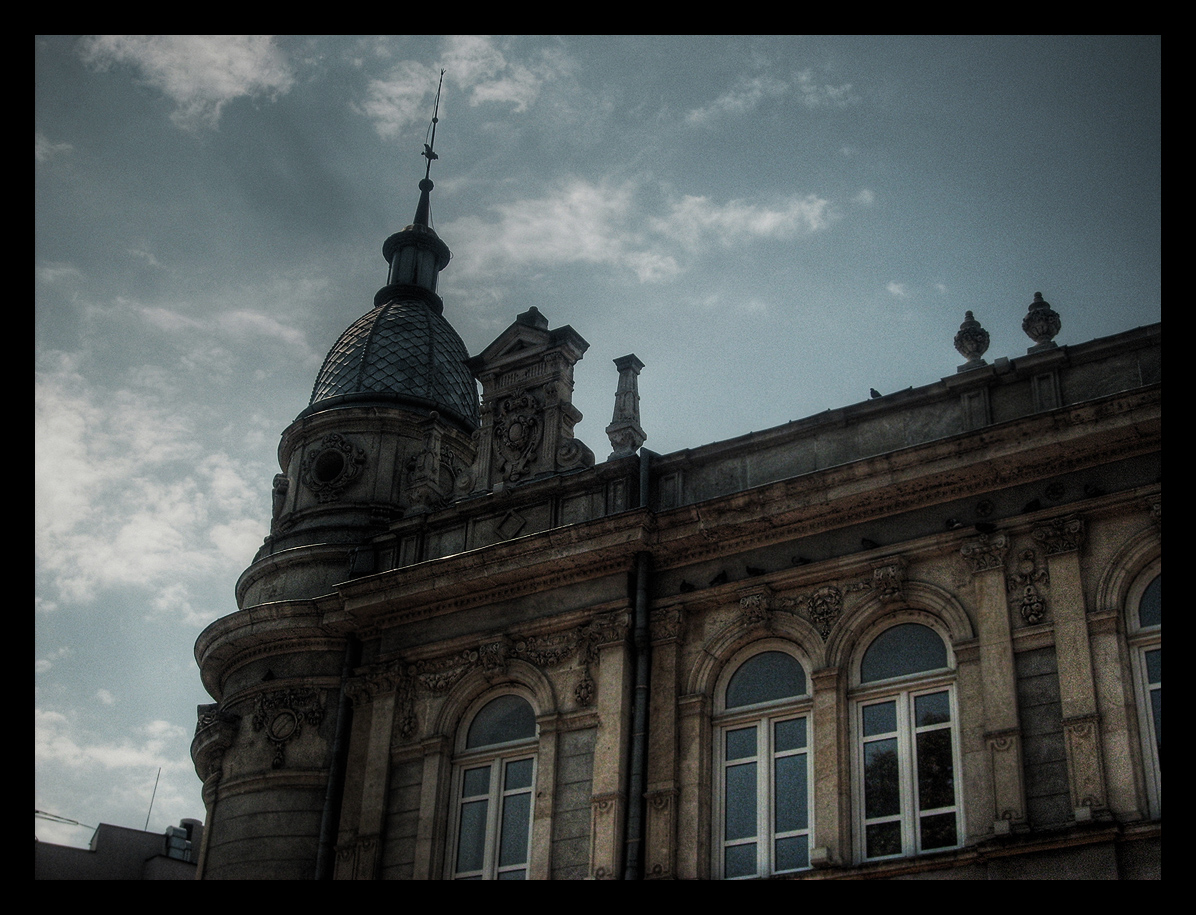

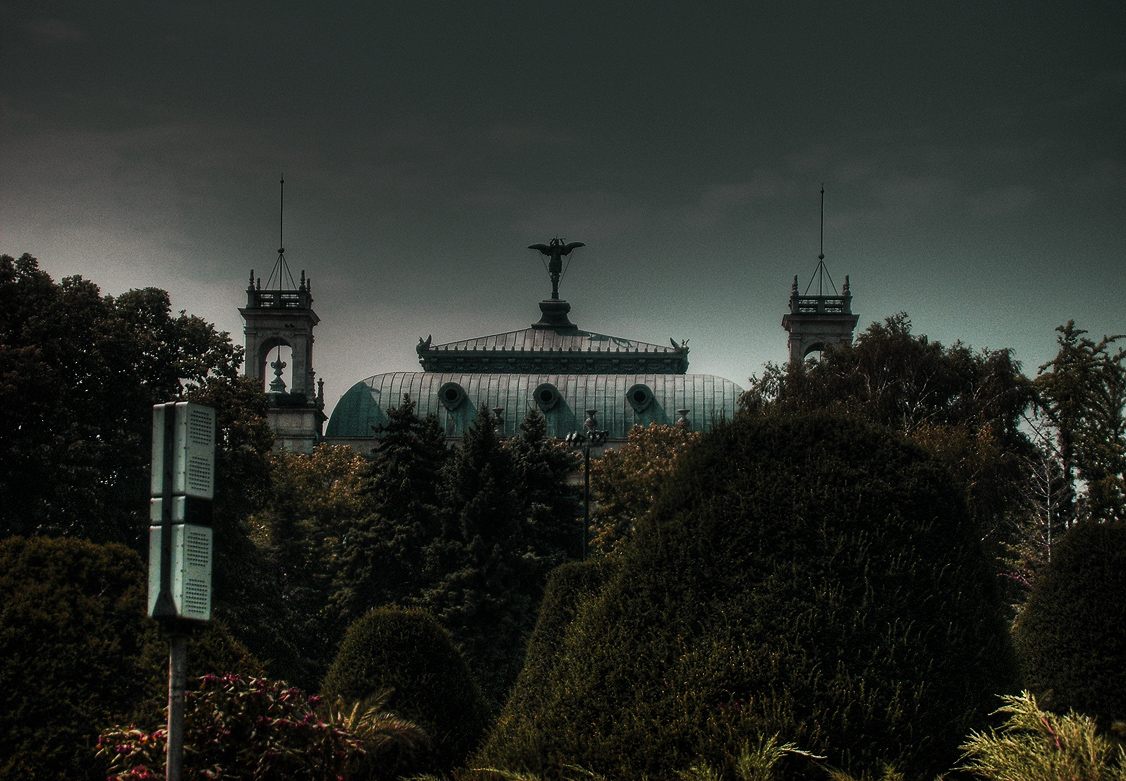

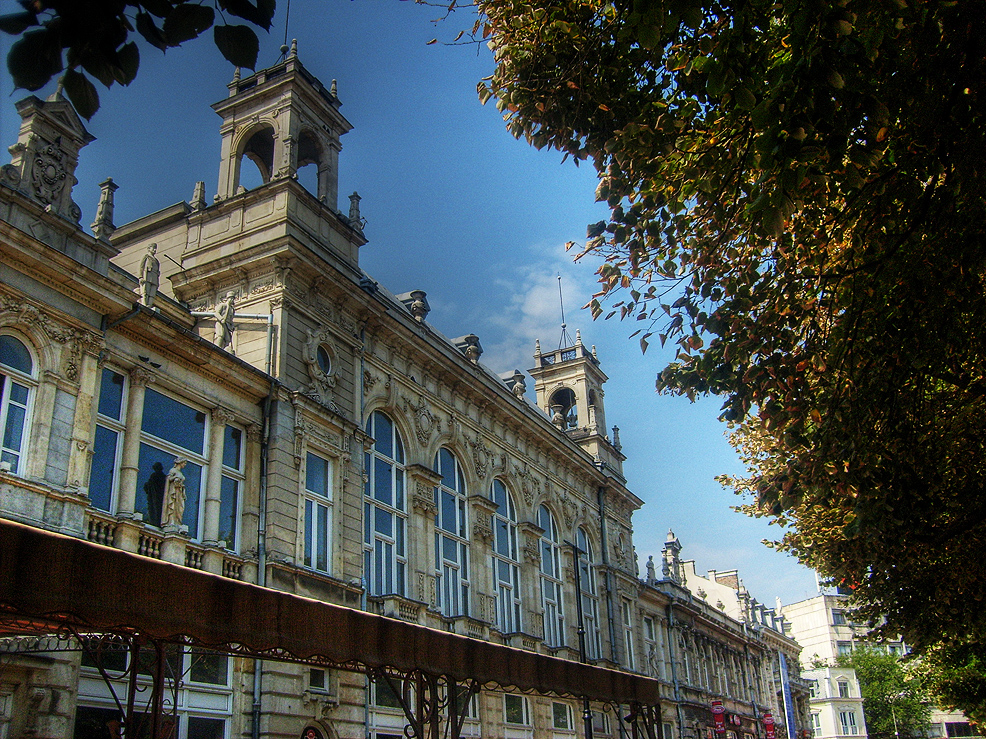

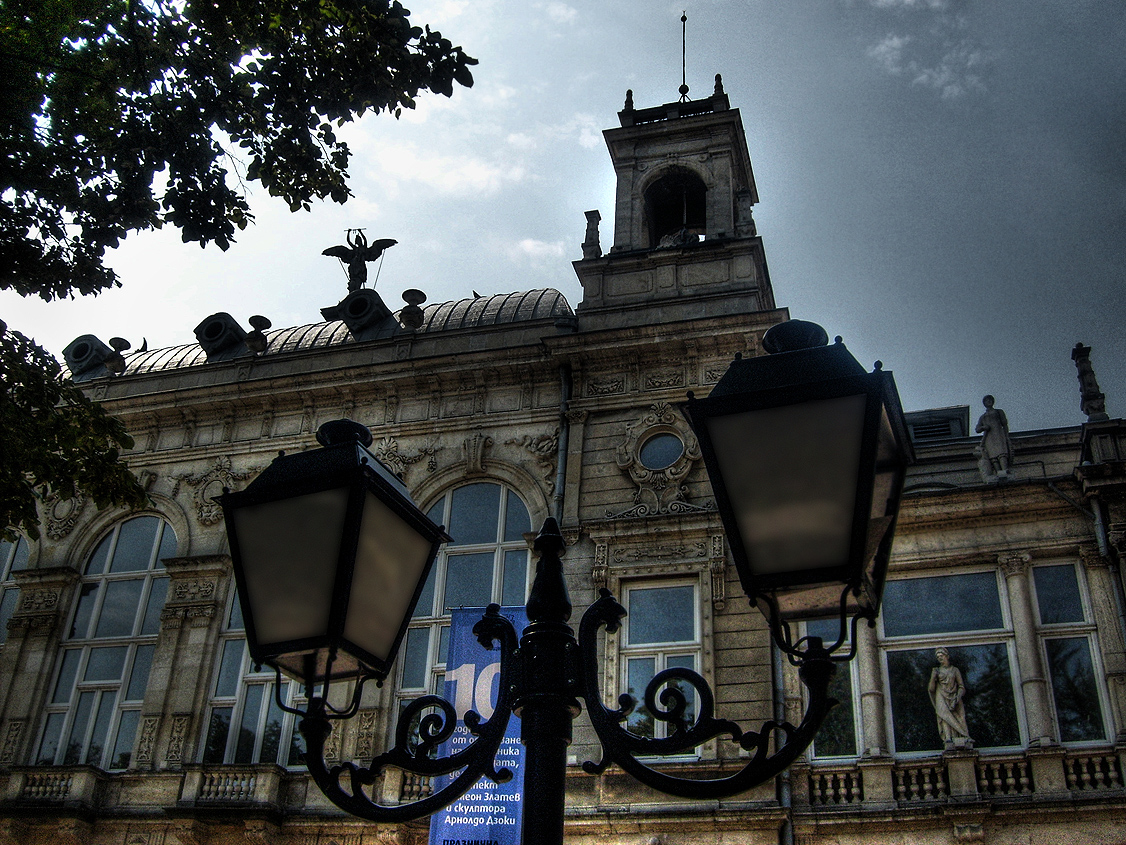

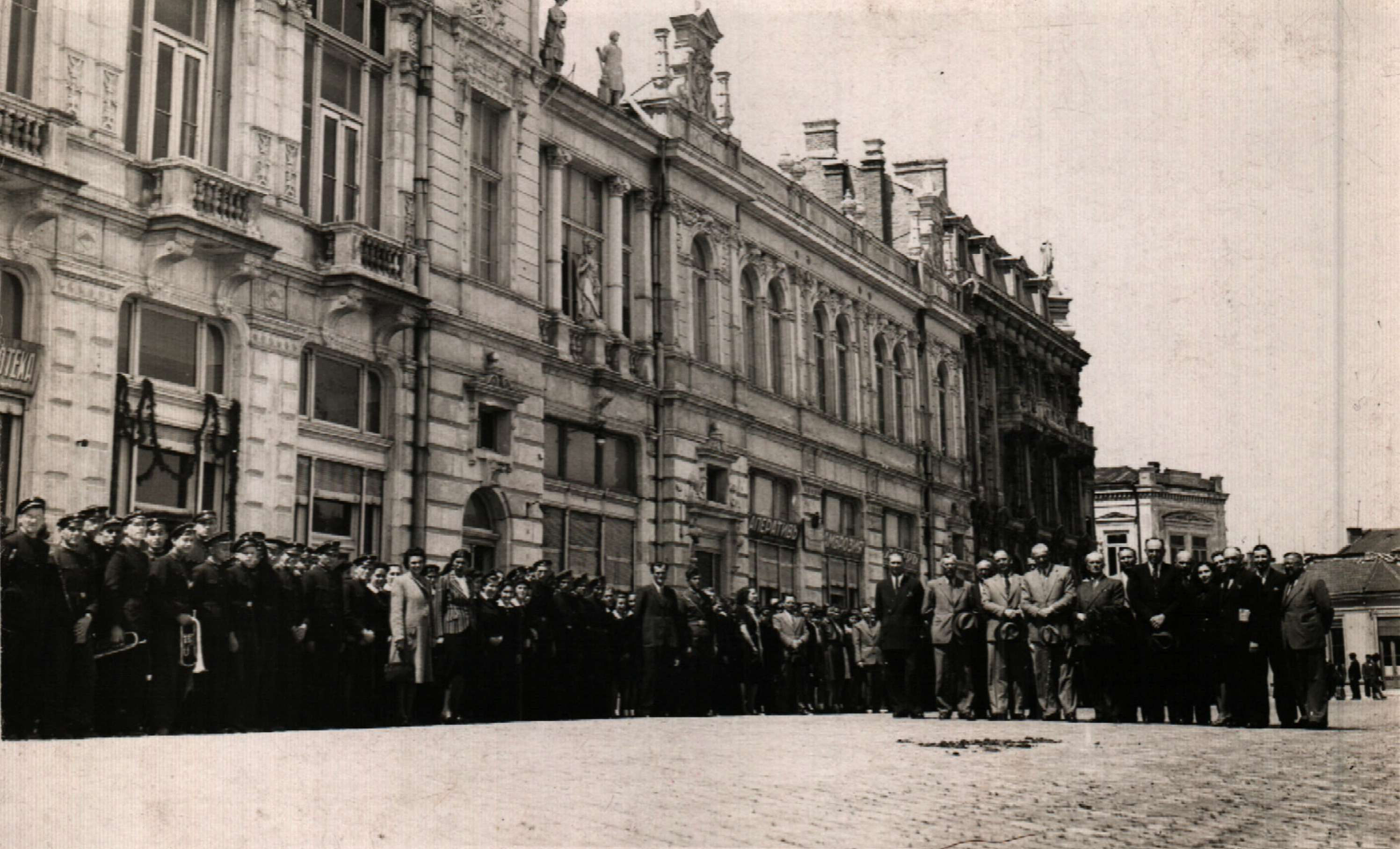
