= Hfuhruhurr =

Publication information
- Publisher: DC Comics
- First appearance: The Adventures of Superman Annual #1 (September 1987)
- Created by: Jim Starlin; Dan Jurgens

In-story information
- Team affiliations: The Union
- Notable aliases: The Word-Bringer
- Abilities: Psionic abilities; Superhuman intellect in the expertise of genetics, biochemistry, and technology

Hfuhruhurr, also known as the Word-Bringer, is a supervillain who appeared twice as an antagonist for Superman. He was created by Jim Starlin and Dan Jurgens, and is named after Michael Hfuhruhurr, the protagonist in The Man with Two Brains.

== Fictional character biography ==
Hfuhruhurr is a leader of a cult he calls the Union, consisting of multiple brains linked together in a telepathic gestalt. The circumstances that prompted him to create the Union are unknown, but he appears to be convinced that he is doing those in the Union a favour, describing himself once as bringing 'the Word' to the 'unenlightened', arguing that belonging to the Union grants eternal life and great knowledge to its members. Hfuhruhurr first appears in The Adventures of Superman Annual #1. The President of the United States asks Superman to investigate Trudeau, South Dakota after its citizens disappeared. As Superman investigates, he is attacked by a tentacled creature. The creature escapes and Superman discovers an alien ship containing the brains of Trudeau's inhabitants preserved in jars connected to a life-support apparatus. Hfuhruhurr revealed that he removed their brains from their bodies to create the Union, for them to "become one with a higher power" and "remove them from their prisons of the flesh", and converted their bodies into the creature Superman had fought earlier. The creature then appears and Superman destroys it with his heat vision. Hfuhruhurr escapes into space while his victims psionically deactivate their life-support systems, effectively committing suicide.

Hfuhruhurr returns during Superman's self-imposed exile from Earth, during which he attacks several aliens to make them part of the Union. Superman deduces that Hfuhruhurr is responsible and attacks him. When Superman gains the upper hand, Hfuhruhurr uses his machinery to create Eon, a manifestation of the Union, to battle him. Superman convinces Eon to reject Hfuhruhurr's demands as they realize how distant they had become from the individual lives they had once been. With Superman unable to hand Hfuhruhurr over to authorities, the Union promises to use Eon to keep Hfuhruhurr in check, vowing that they would only recruit the willing minds of those near death to join the Union.

== Powers and abilities ==
Hfuhruhurr has various psionic abilities including telepathy, telekinesis, and the ability to manipulate psionic energy into waves of concussive force. He also has a superhuman intellect showing advanced scientific knowledge, allowing him to surgically remove and preserve brains. He has extensive knowledge of technology far surpassing present-day Earth.
