= Lightbringer =

Lightbringer may refer to:

- Lucifer, a Latin name meaning "light-bringer"

== Books ==
- Lightbringer, a 2010s series of novels by Brent Weeks
- Lightbringer, a 2020 novel in the Empirium trilogy by Claire Legrand
- Light Bringer (Brown novel), a 2023 novel in the Red Rising series by Pierce Brown

== Characters ==
- The Lightbringer, a character in the 2003 novel Chosen of the Gods by Chris Pierson
- Uther the Lightbringer, a character in the 2002 video game Warcraft III: Reign of Chaos

== Music ==
- Light Bringer (band), Japanese power metal band
- "Lightbringer", a song by the band Covenant from the album Modern Ruin
- "Lightbringer", a song by Pentakill

== Other uses ==
- Lightbringer, the only weapon that can kill Dracula in the 2013 film Dracula: The Dark Prince
- Dungeon Magic, an arcade game also known as Light Bringer

== See also ==
- Light bearer (disambiguation)
