= Dobrova =

Dobrova may refer to:

- Dobrova, Dobrova–Polhov Gradec, a settlement in the Municipality of Dobrova–Polhov Gradec, Slovenia
- Dobrova-Polhov Gradec, a Municipality in Slovenia
- Dobrova, Celje, Slovenia
- Maria Dmitriyevna Dobrova (1907–1962), Soviet military intelligence officer
