= Bukovžlak =

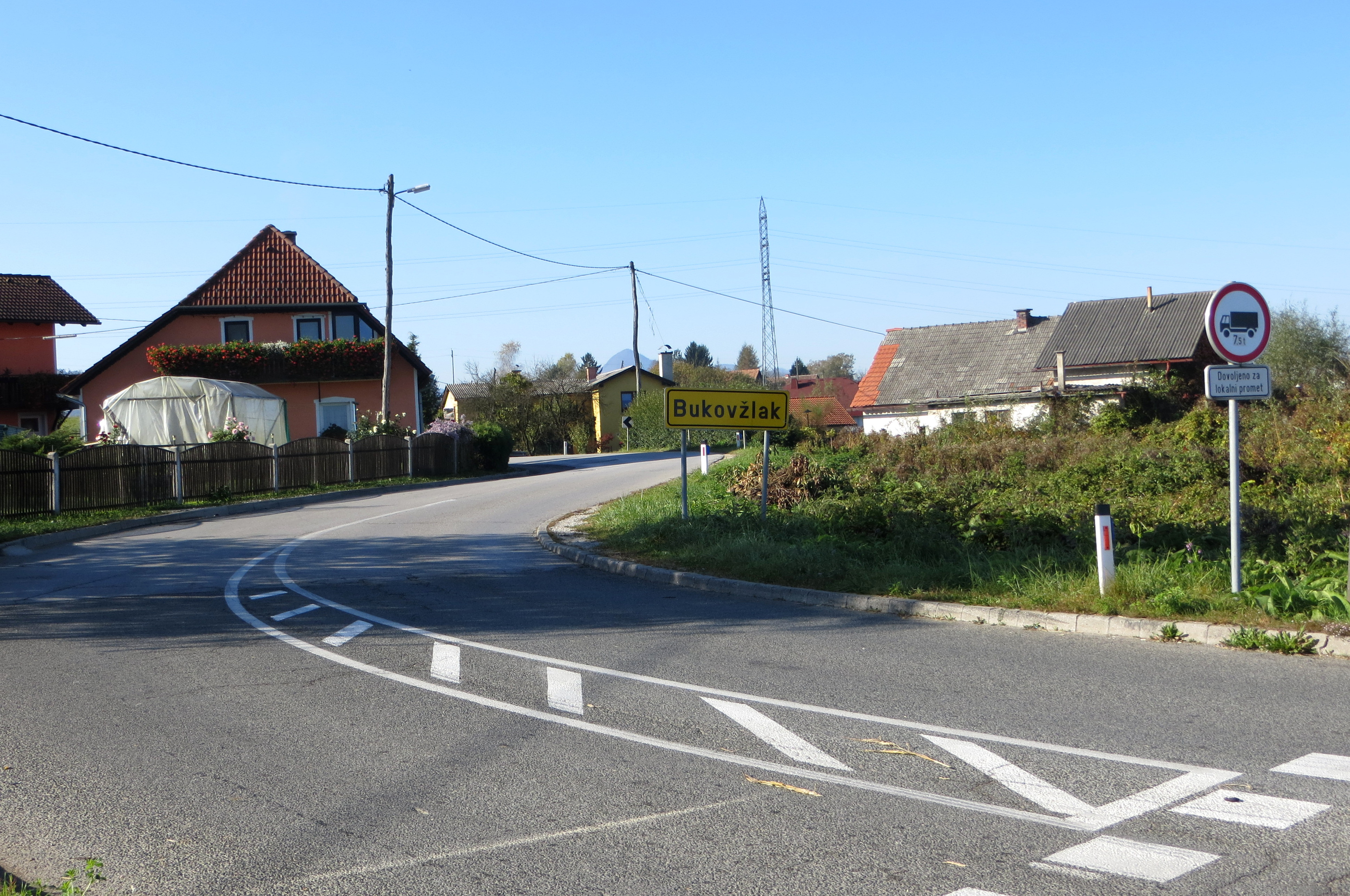

- Location in Slovenia
- Coordinates: 46°14′11.65″N 15°18′33.28″E
- Country: Slovenia
- Traditional region: Styria
- Statistical region: Savinja
- Municipality: Celje

Area
  - Total: 3.08 km^{2} (1.19 sq mi)
- Elevation: 264.1 m (866 ft)

Population (2020)
  - Total: 400
  - Density: 130/km^{2} (340/sq mi)

Bukovžlak (pronounced [ˈbuːkɔʒlak]; German: Buchenschlag) is a settlement in the City Municipality of Celje in eastern Slovenia. It lies on the eastern outskirts of Celje, just north of Teharje. The area is part of the traditional region of Styria. It is now included with the rest of the municipality in the Savinja Statistical Region.

== Name ==
Bukovžlak was first attested in written sources in 1763–87 as Bukova Slaka. The name is a compound formed from the Slovene adjective bukov 'beech' and German Schlag 'clearing, cleared area', referring to an area where a beech forest was cleared. The meaning of the name is also confirmed by Bukov Laz (literally, 'beech clearing'), the name of an older settlement at the approximate site of present-day Bukovžlak.

== History ==
In the past, the area was the property of nobility in Teharje. Bežigrad Manor, which stood above the confluence of the Voglajna River and Ložnica Creek, was first mentioned in 1666. The manor was plundered by the German army during the Second World War, and then taken over by the Yugoslav army after the war. It was razed in 1981.

=== Mass graves ===
Bukovžlak is the site of six known mass graves from the period immediately after the Second World War. They are part of the 25 mass graves in the Celje area. They all contain the remains of an unknown number of people from the Celje concentration camps murdered in the summer of 1945. The Čater Meadow 1 and 2 mass graves (Slovene: Grobišče na Čatrovem travniku 1, 2) are located about 550 m north of the central monument at the Teharje memorial park, on the right side of the road from Bukovžlak to Ljubečna. The Municipal Dump Mass Grave (Grobišča pod komunalno deponijo) is located next to the Teharje memorial park, on the north side of the local dump. The Military Depot Mass Grave (Grobišča na območju vojaških skladišč) is located between the municipal dump and the titanium gypsum waste dump, about 600 m east of the Teharje memorial park. The Meadow Barrier Mass Grave (Grobišče v pregradi Za travnikom) is located about 800 m east of the Teharje memorial park. Human remains were uncovered in 1989 while building an earthen barrier for the waste dump for the zinc works. The remains were bulldozed into the new barrier. The Bežigrad Mass Grave (Grobišče Bežigrad) encompasses a former antitank trench that ran from the Janez Mlinar Manor (Dvorec Mlinarjev Janez, which was used as a headquarters by the Teharje prison camp officials) to the Sodina house near the EMO factory, a gravel pit, a firing trench, other pits, and a spruce woods. The grave contains the remains of a large number of German prisoners of war, ethnic German civilians, Home Guard soldiers, Slovene civilians, Ustaša soldiers, Romani civilians, and Gottschee Germans that were murdered in May, June, and July 1945.

== Notable people ==
Notable people that were born or lived in Bukovžlak include:

- Henrik Peternel (1875–1951), beekeeping expert
