= Čret, Celje =

Čret
- Location in Slovenia
- Coordinates: 46°14′02″N 15°17′29″E
- Country: Slovenia
- Traditional region: Styria
- Statistical region: Savinja
- Municipality: Celje
- Elevation: 240 m (790 ft)

Čret (pronounced [ˈtʃɾeːt]; German: Tschret) is a former settlement in the City Municipality of Celje in northeastern Slovenia. It is now part of the city of Celje. The area is part of the traditional region of Styria. The municipality is now included in the Savinja Statistical Region.

== Geography ==
Čret is a clustered settlement in the eastern part of Celje along Teharje Street (Slovene: Teharska cesta). To the north and east, it extends to the former course of the Voglajna River, and to the south, to Selce. It consists of two parts: Spodnji Čret (literally, 'lower Čret') lies in the level area between the former course of the Voglajna River and the railway, and Zgornji Čret (literally, 'upper Čret') lies along Teharje Street and the slope to the south rising above the town cemetery. The soil in the area is loamy. The lower part of the settlement, where the land has a more swampy character, is a former common where oaks grew.

== Name ==
The name Čret, like related names (e.g., Čreta and Začret), is derived from the common noun čret 'swampy meadow', referring to the local terrain.

== History ==
During the First World War, the archaeologist Franz Lorger excavated the foundation of a Roman villa on the slope above Teharje Street, testifying to early settlement of the area. Čret was annexed by Celje in 1964, ending its existence as an independent settlement. Most of Spodnji Čret was destroyed in the 1970s, when the freight railway station was built in Celje, as well as for the zinc plant to the north of that.
