= Dolina, Tržič =

Dolina
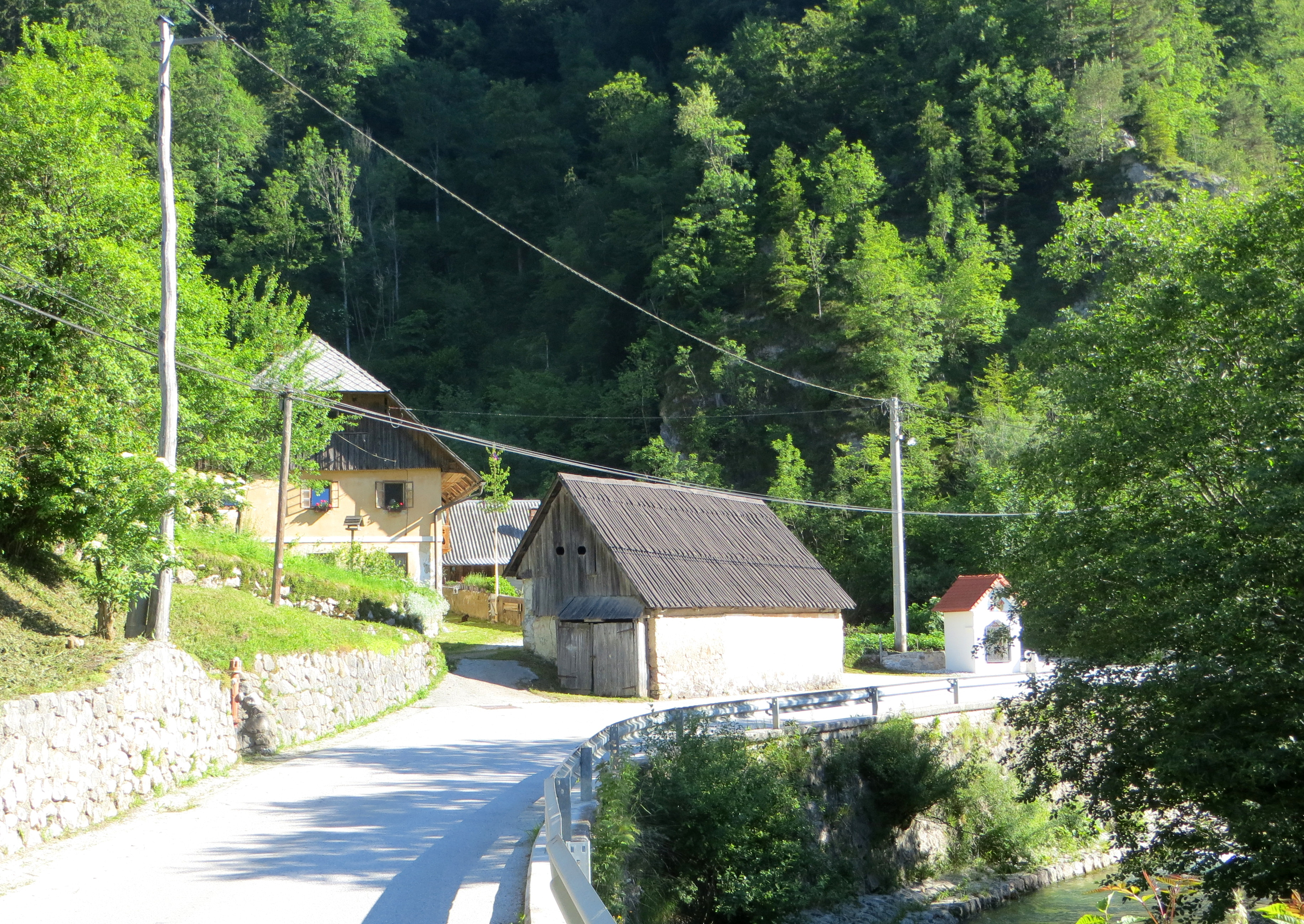

- Location in Slovenia
- Coordinates: 46°23′29.42″N 14°19′49.78″E
- Country: Slovenia
- Traditional region: Upper Carniola
- Statistical region: Upper Carniola
- Municipality: Tržič
- Elevation: 730.9 m (2,398 ft)

Population (2002)
  - Total: 70

Dolina (pronounced [dɔˈliːna]) is a settlement on the Tržič Bistrica River in the Municipality of Tržič in the Upper Carniola region of Slovenia.

== Geography ==
Dolina is a scattered settlement in the valley of the Tržič Bistrica River and along both slopes. The hamlet of Na Jamah lies in the lower part of the settlement, at the north end of the Dovžan Gorge, and the main population center, Zgornja Dolina, lies further north, where Kališnik Creek flows into the Tržič Bistrica. The settlement also includes the isolated Kušpergar, Urh, and Pinč farms. There is little tilled land, and most of the area is forested. There are falls on the Tržič Bistrica near the hamlet of Na Jamah. Southwest of the Kušpergar farm there is a rock formation known as the Kušpergar Towers (Slovene: Kušpergarjevi turni), which are the remnants of ancient coral reefs.

== Notable people ==
Notable people that were born or lived in Dolina include:

- Filip Bence (1950–2009), rock climber
