= Bossard =

Bossard is a surname which may have origins in similar names in Normandy. Notable people with the surname include:

- Frank Bossard (1912–2001), British intelligence service agent and Soviet spy
- Roger Bossard (born 1949), American groundskeeper
