= Loče =

Loče may refer to the following settlements in Slovenia:

- Loče, Brežice
- Loče, Celje
- Loče, Slovenske Konjice
