= Slance =

- Location in Slovenia
- Coordinates: 46°13′57.12″N 15°18′15.93″E
- Country: Slovenia
- Traditional region: Styria
- Statistical region: Savinja
- Municipality: Celje

Area
  - Total: 0.31 km^{2} (0.12 sq mi)
- Elevation: 253.2 m (831 ft)

Population (2020)
  - Total: 80
  - Density: 260/km^{2} (670/sq mi)

Slance (pronounced [ˈslaːntsɛ]) is a small settlement in the City Municipality of Celje in eastern Slovenia. It lies on the eastern outskirts of Celje, just north of Teharje. The area is part of the traditional region of Styria. It is now included with the rest of the municipality in the Savinja Statistical Region.
