= Lipovec pri Škofji Vasi =

Lipovec pri Škofji Vasi Lipovec (until 1955)
- Location in Slovenia
- Coordinates: 46°15′31.05″N 15°20′9.46″E
- Country: Slovenia
- Traditional region: Styria
- Statistical region: Savinja
- Municipality: Celje

Area
  - Total: 0.61 km^{2} (0.24 sq mi)
- Elevation: 280.1 m (919 ft)

Population (2020)
  - Total: 39
  - Density: 64/km^{2} (170/sq mi)

Lipovec pri Škofji Vasi (pronounced [ˈliːpɔʋəts pɾi ˈʃkoːfji ˈʋaːsi]; Slovene: Lipovec pri Škofji vasi) is a small settlement in the City Municipality of Celje in eastern Slovenia. It lies just east of Ljubečna on the eastern outskirts of Celje. The area is part of the traditional region of Styria. It is now included with the rest of the municipality in the Savinja Statistical Region.

== Name ==
The name of the settlement was changed from Lipovec to Lipovec pri Škofji vasi in 1955.
