= Šmiklavž pri Škofji Vasi =

Šmiklavž pri Škofji Vasi Šmiklavž pri Škofji vasi Šmiklavž (until 1955)
- Location in Slovenia
- Coordinates: 46°16′2.89″N 15°19′37.9″E
- Country: Slovenia
- Traditional region: Styria
- Statistical region: Savinja
- Municipality: Celje

Area
  - Total: 1.6 km^{2} (0.62 sq mi)
- Elevation: 270.5 m (887 ft)

Population (2020)
  - Total: 209
  - Density: 130/km^{2} (340/sq mi)

Šmiklavž pri Škofji Vasi (pronounced [ʃmiˈklaːu̯ʃ pɾi ˈʃkoːfji ˈʋaːsi]; Slovene: Šmiklavž pri Škofji vasi) is a settlement in the City Municipality of Celje in eastern Slovenia. It lies on the northeastern outskirts of Celje, just north of Ljubečna. The area is part of the traditional region of Styria. It is now included with the rest of the municipality in the Savinja Statistical Region.

== Name ==
The name of the settlement was changed from Šmiklavž to Šmiklavž pri Škofji vasi in 1955.
