= Jezerce =

In Croatia:

- Jezerce, Croatia, a village in Lika–Senj County

In Slovenia:

- Jezerce pri Šmartnem, a settlement in the City Municipality of Celje
- Jezerce pri Dobjem, a settlement in the Municipality of Dobje

In Albania:

- Jezercë, the second-highest mountain of Albania
