= Prekorje =

- Location in Slovenia
- Coordinates: 46°16′7.24″N 15°16′43.24″E
- Country: Slovenia
- Traditional region: Styria
- Statistical region: Savinja
- Municipality: Celje

Area
  - Total: 0.95 km^{2} (0.37 sq mi)
- Elevation: 280.6 m (921 ft)

Population (2020)
  - Total: 376
  - Density: 400/km^{2} (1,000/sq mi)

Prekorje (pronounced [ˈpɾeːkɔɾjɛ]) is a settlement in the City Municipality of Celje in eastern Slovenia. It lies north of Celje, just west of Škofja Vas. The area is part of the traditional region of Styria. It is now included with the rest of the municipality in the Savinja Statistical Region.
