= Sveta Marjeta =

Sveta Marjeta may refer to several places in Slovenia:

- Marjeta na Dravskem Polju, a settlement in the Municipality of Starše, known as Sveta Marjeta na Dravskem polju until 1955
- Šmarjeta pri Celju, a settlement in the Municipality of Celje, known as Sveta Marjeta until 1964
- Žlebe, a settlement in the Municipality of Medvode, known locally as Sveta Marjeta
