= Vrhe, Celje =

Vrhe
- Location in Slovenia
- Coordinates: 46°13′34.12″N 15°18′40.86″E
- Country: Slovenia
- Traditional region: Styria
- Statistical region: Savinja
- Municipality: Celje

Area
  - Total: 0.99 km^{2} (0.38 sq mi)
- Elevation: 278.9 m (915 ft)

Population (2020)
  - Total: 230
  - Density: 230/km^{2} (600/sq mi)

Vrhe (pronounced [ʋəɾˈxeː]) is a settlement in the City Municipality of Celje in eastern Slovenia. It lies in the eastern outskirts of Celje to the east of Teharje. The area is part of the traditional region of Styria. It is now included with the rest of the municipality in the Savinja Statistical Region.

== Church ==
The local church is dedicated to Saint Anne and belongs to the Parish of Teharje. It dates to the mid-15th century.

== Mass grave ==
Vrhe is the site of a mass grave from the period immediately after the Second World War. It is part of the 25 mass graves in the Celje area. The Teharje Mass Grave (Slovene: Grobišče Teharje) is located 50 meters (160 ft) north of the upper barrier in the Celje Zinc Works solid waste dump and about 30 meters (98 ft) west of the fence. It is over 10 meters (33 ft) deep. It contains the remains of German and Slovene prisoners that died at the Teharje camp.
