= Šentjungert =

Šentjungert Sveta Jungert (until 1984)
- Location in Slovenia
- Coordinates: 46°17′39.37″N 15°13′11.11″E
- Country: Slovenia
- Traditional region: Styria
- Statistical region: Savinja
- Municipality: Celje

Area
  - Total: 2.04 km^{2} (0.79 sq mi)
- Elevation: 428 m (1,404 ft)

Population (2020)
  - Total: 157
  - Density: 77.0/km^{2} (199/sq mi)

Šentjungert (pronounced [ʃɛntˈjuːŋɡəɾt] or [ʃəntˈjuːŋɡəɾt]) is a settlement in the City Municipality of Celje in eastern Slovenia. It lies on the northwestern outskirts of Celje. The area is part of the traditional region of Styria. It is now included with the rest of the municipality in the Savinja Statistical Region.

== Name ==
The name of the settlement was changed from Sveta Jungert to Šentjungert in 1984.

== Church ==
The local church is dedicated to Saint Cunigunde and belongs to the Parish of Galicija. It dates to the 14th century.
