= Landol =

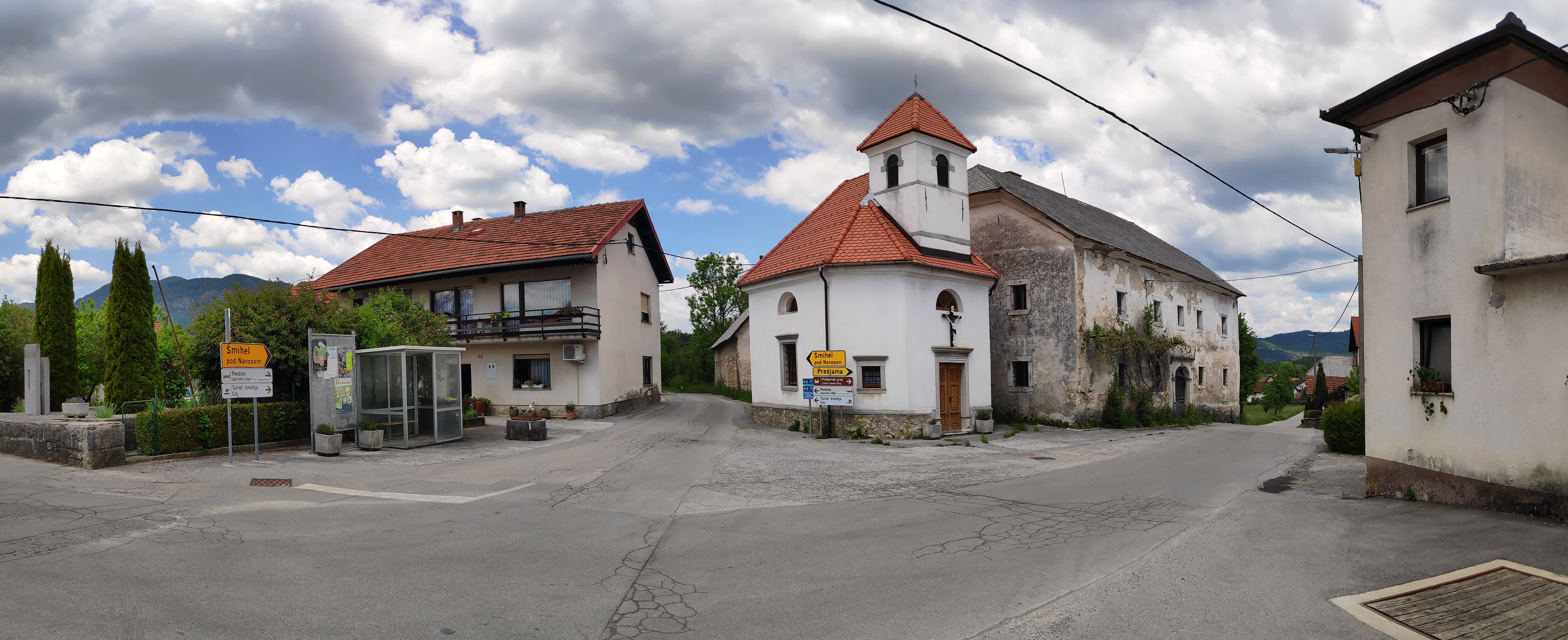

- Location in Slovenia
- Coordinates: 45°47′34.17″N 14°7′57.52″E
- Country: Slovenia
- Traditional region: Inner Carniola
- Statistical region: Littoral–Inner Carniola
- Municipality: Postojna

Area
  - Total: 4.28 km^{2} (1.65 sq mi)
- Elevation: 540.9 m (1,775 ft)

Population (2022)
  - Total: 1,210

Landol (pronounced [lanˈdou̯ː]; Italian: Landolo) is a village in the Municipality of Postojna in the Inner Carniola region of Slovenia.

== Name ==
Landol was attested in written sources as Landol in 1313 (and as Londol in 1335, Landovia in 1398, and Lanndaw in 1406). The name is a compound, formed from *lani 'hind, female red deer' + dol 'valley', thus 'red deer valley'. Compare also Runtole, formerly known as Landoll, as well as Jelendol for a name with the same semantic motivation.

== History ==
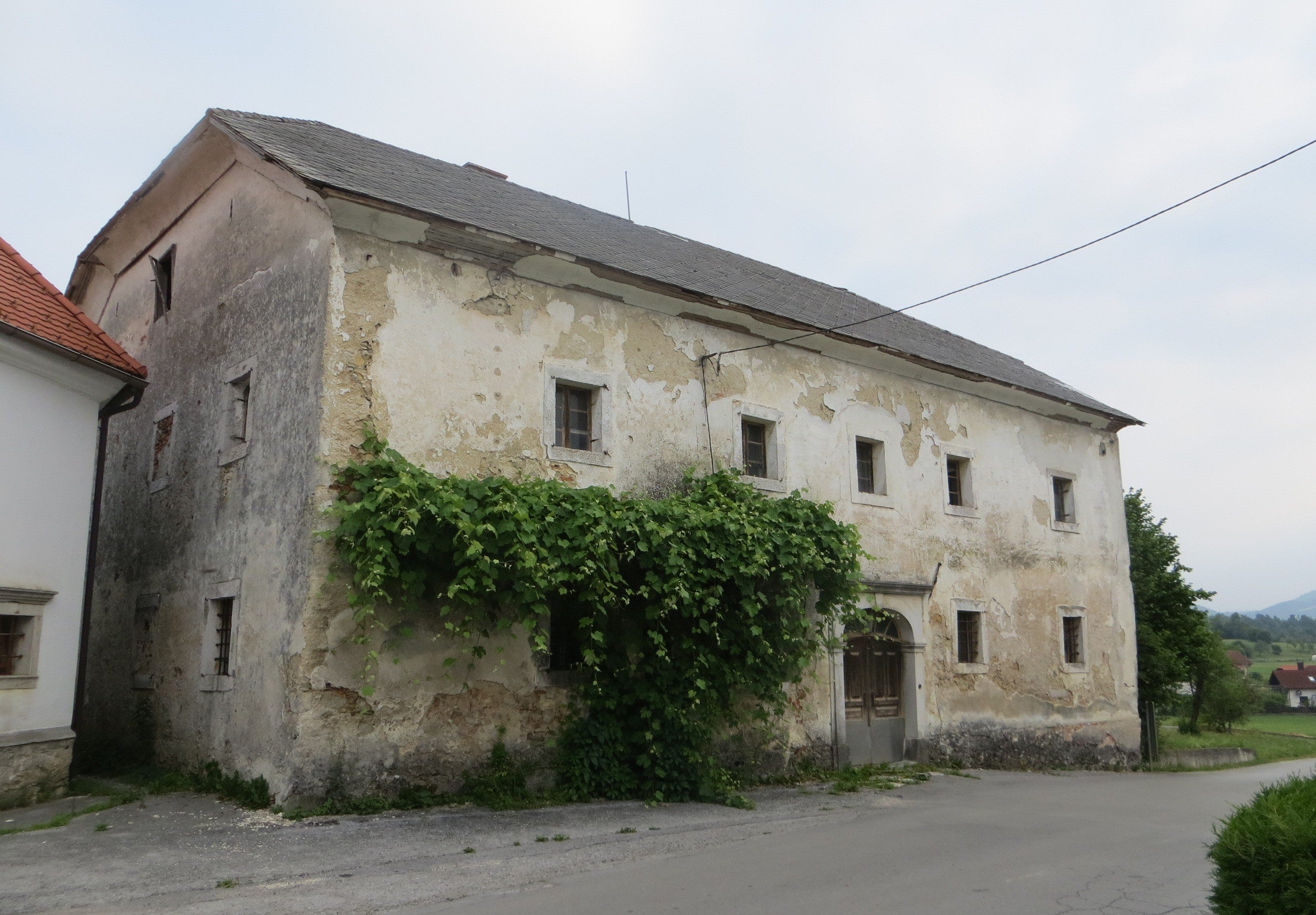
Toll house in Landol

A major trade route connecting Ljubljana with the sea passed through Landol from Roman times until the mid-18th century. A toll house, mentioned in written sources in 1398, was established in the village, and there was also a customs office.

Slovenian Partisans were active in the area during the Second World War and had a bunker in the area. In December 1944, the Partisans burned the lumber at the sawmill in the hamlet of Brinje. The steam-powered sawmill stopped operating in 1948.

== Churches ==
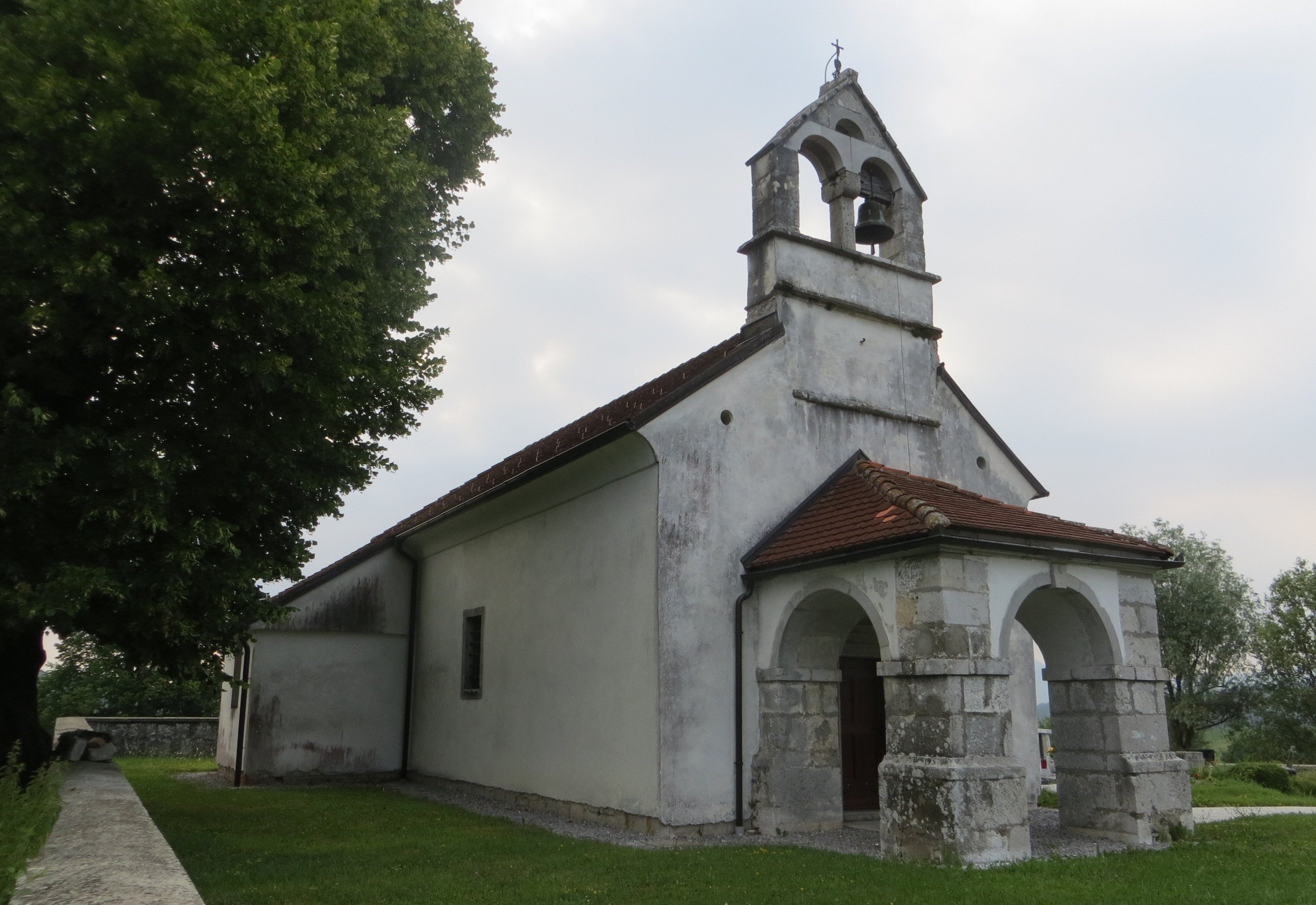
Saint Nicholas's Church

There are two churches in the settlement. The church in the hamlet of Brinje is dedicated to Saint Nicholas, and the small church in Landol itself is dedicated to Saint Josse. Both churches belong to the Parish of Hrenovice.
