= Medlog =

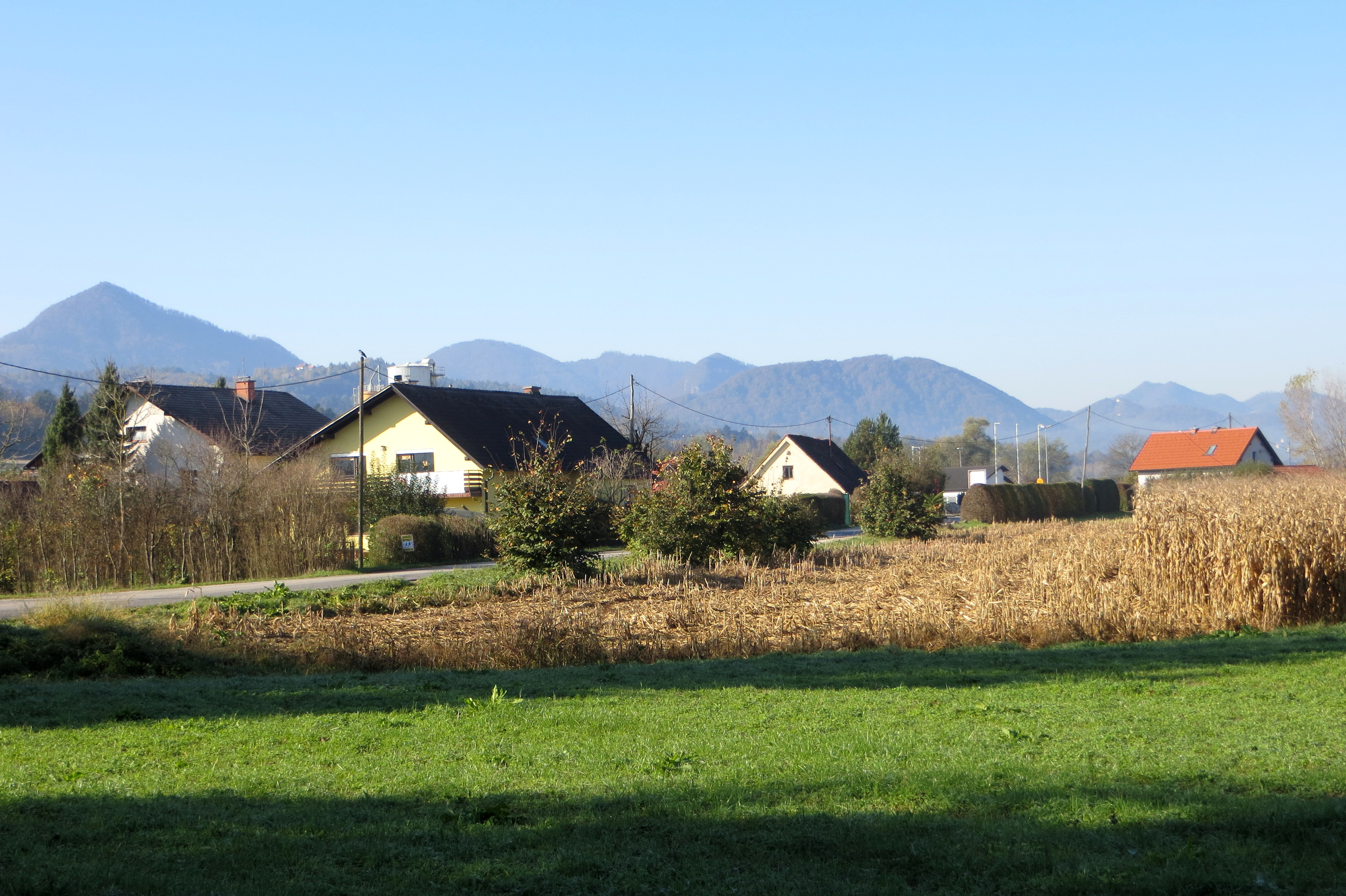

- Location in Slovenia
- Coordinates: 46°14′42.3″N 15°13′38.73″E
- Country: Slovenia
- Traditional region: Styria
- Statistical region: Savinja
- Municipality: Celje

Area
  - Total: 3.41 km^{2} (1.32 sq mi)
- Elevation: 241.3 m (792 ft)

Population (2020)
  - Total: 318
  - Density: 93.3/km^{2} (242/sq mi)

Medlog (pronounced [ˈmeːdlɔk]) is a settlement in the City Municipality of Celje in eastern Slovenia. It lies on the western outskirts of Celje. The grass runway of Celje Airport is located in the western part of the settlement. The area is part of the traditional region of Styria. It is now included with the rest of the municipality in the Savinja Statistical Region.

== Mass graves ==
Medlog is the site of three known mass graves from the period immediately after the Second World War. They are part of the 25 mass graves in the Celje area. The Slovenijales Mass Grave (Slovene: Grobišče Slovenijales) lies south of the settlement, in a former trench used to store gasoline barrels near the Medlog Airport and where the Slovenijales factory and Avto Celje premises now stand. It contains the remains of a large number of Croatian civilians murdered in May and June 1945. The Tirdrož Mass Grave (Grobišče Tirdrož), also known as the Tirgut Mass Grave (Grobišče Tirgut), is located between Ložnica Creek to the north, a water pumping station to the west, and the main road to the south. It measures 320 by 320 meters (1,050 by 1,050 ft) and contains the remains of Croatian refugees murdered in May 1945. The Lipovšek Meadow Mass Grave (Grobišče Lipovškov travnik), also known as the Šef Woods Mass Grave (Grobišče Šefov gozd), is a former antitank trench in the northeast part of the settlement. It contains the remains of about 400 Croatian civilian refugees in four areas measuring 2 by 10 meters (6 ft 7 in by 32 ft 10 in). Human remains were uncovered by the Nivo Celje company during excavation work at the site and disposed of in an unknown manner.
