= Slatina v Rožni Dolini =

Slatina v Rožni Dolini Slatina (until 1955)
- Location in Slovenia
- Coordinates: 46°16′53.85″N 15°14′38.75″E
- Country: Slovenia
- Traditional region: Styria
- Statistical region: Savinja
- Municipality: Celje

Area
  - Total: 1.31 km^{2} (0.51 sq mi)
- Elevation: 298.7 m (980 ft)

Population (2020)
  - Total: 245
  - Density: 187/km^{2} (484/sq mi)

Slatina v Rožni Dolini (pronounced [ˈslaːtina w ˈɾoːʒni dɔˈliːni]; Slovene: Slatina v Rožni dolini) is a settlement in the City Municipality of Celje in eastern Slovenia. It lies on the northern outskirts of Celje. The area is part of the traditional region of Styria. It is now included with the rest of the municipality in the Savinja Statistical Region.

== Name ==
The name of the settlement was changed from Slatina to Slatina v Rožni dolini in 1955.
