= Gorica pri Šmartnem =

Gorica pri Šmartnem Gorica (until 1953)
- Location in Slovenia
- Coordinates: 46°16′18.98″N 15°13′44.41″E
- Country: Slovenia
- Traditional region: Styria
- Statistical region: Savinja
- Municipality: Celje

Area
  - Total: 4.02 km^{2} (1.55 sq mi)
- Elevation: 283 m (928 ft)

Population (2020)
  - Total: 525
  - Density: 131/km^{2} (338/sq mi)

Gorica pri Šmartnem (pronounced [ɡɔˈɾiːtsa pɾi ˈʃmaːɾtnɛm]) is a settlement in the City Municipality of Celje in eastern Slovenia. It lies on the eastern outskirts of the town of Celje. The area is part of the traditional region of Styria. It is now included with the rest of the municipality in the Savinja Statistical Region.

== Name ==
The name of the settlement was changed from Gorica to Gorica pri Šmartnem in 1953.

== Cultural heritage ==
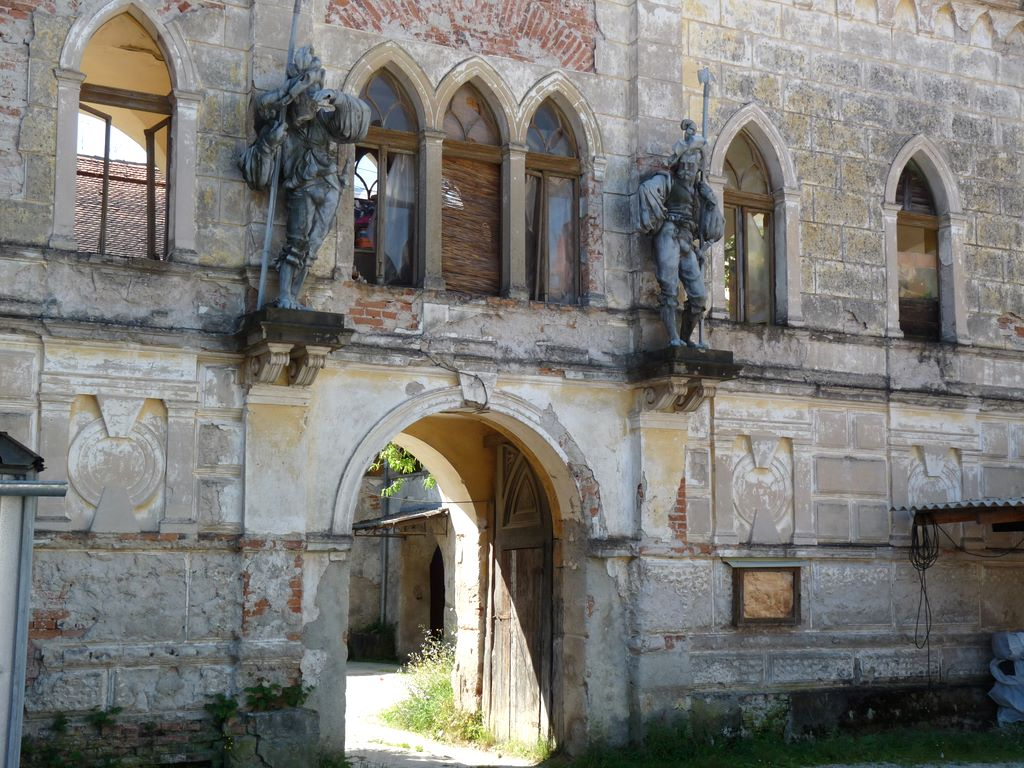
The entrance of Prešnik Mansion, decorated with tin sculptures

The Prešnik Mansion in the northern part of the settlement was built in the late 17th century on the site of an earlier building and retains its Baroque features despite extensive 19th-century rebuilding.
