= Košnica pri Celju =

Košnica pri Celju Košnica (until 1955)
- Location in Slovenia
- Coordinates: 46°13′2.91″N 15°14′33.05″E
- Country: Slovenia
- Traditional region: Styria
- Statistical region: Savinja
- Municipality: Celje

Area
  - Total: 4.23 km^{2} (1.63 sq mi)
- Elevation: 315.2 m (1,034 ft)

Population (2020)
  - Total: 568
  - Density: 134/km^{2} (348/sq mi)

Košnica pri Celju (pronounced [ˈkoːʃnitsa pɾi ˈtsɛ̀ːlju]) is a settlement in the City Municipality of Celje in eastern Slovenia. The area is part of the traditional region of Styria. It is now included with the rest of the municipality in the Savinja Statistical Region.

== Name ==
The name of the settlement was changed from Košnica to Košnica pri Celju in 1955.

== Geography ==
Košnica pri Celju is a dispersed settlement above the right bank of the Savinja River on the southwestern outskirts of Celje. It includes the hamlets of Spodnja Kočnica to the south, closer to the river, and Zgornja Košnica to the north, below the southeast slope of Hom Hill (570 meters or 1,870 feet). Lisce Hill (471 meters or 1,545 feet) stands to the northeast, and the Slomnik Ridge (716 meters or 2,349 feet) rises to the southwest. Košnica Creek (Slovene: Košniški potok), a tributary of the Savinja River, flows through the village. The soil is stony and the terrain is partially karstified.

== History ==
During the interwar period, a road was built through Košnica pri Celju from Celje to Laško. Construction of the road required destruction of a rock formation known as the Virgin Cliffs (Slovene: Devine peči, German: Jungfernsprung), which stood above the Savinja River. During the Second World War, German forces shot Anton Bobnič in the hamlet of Zgornja Košnica on July 22, 1942 for collaboration with the Liberation Front. In the postwar period, extensive residential housing was built in the hamlet of Spodnja Kočnica.

=== Mass graves ===
Košnica pri Celju is the site of three known mass graves from the period immediately after the Second World War. All three graves are located south of the road from Košnica pri Celju to Liboje, south of the house at Košnica pri Celju no. 13, in a meadow alongside Košnica Creek (Slovene: Košniški potok). They contain the remains of ethnically Slovene and German residents of Celje as well as Croatian POW's that were murdered between May and July 1945. Field investigations of the graves were carried out in July 2010. Mass Grave 1 (Grobišče 1), also known as the Women's Mass Grave (Grobišče "ženski grob"), contains the remains of 400 to 600 victims. Mass Grave 2 (Grobišče 2) also contains the remains of 400 to 600 victims. Mass Grave 3 (Grobišče 3) contains the remains of 600 to 1,000 victims. Slovenian Directorate for War Veterans and Military Heritage handed over to Croatia in the Dobrava Memorial Park near Maribor on May 13th, 2026, the remains of 306 Croatian victims, men aged 18 to 40, exhumed from 2013 to 2017 from the location. The Croatian victims were buried in a ceremony at Donji Macelj, Croatia, on August 22, 2026.

== Gallery ==
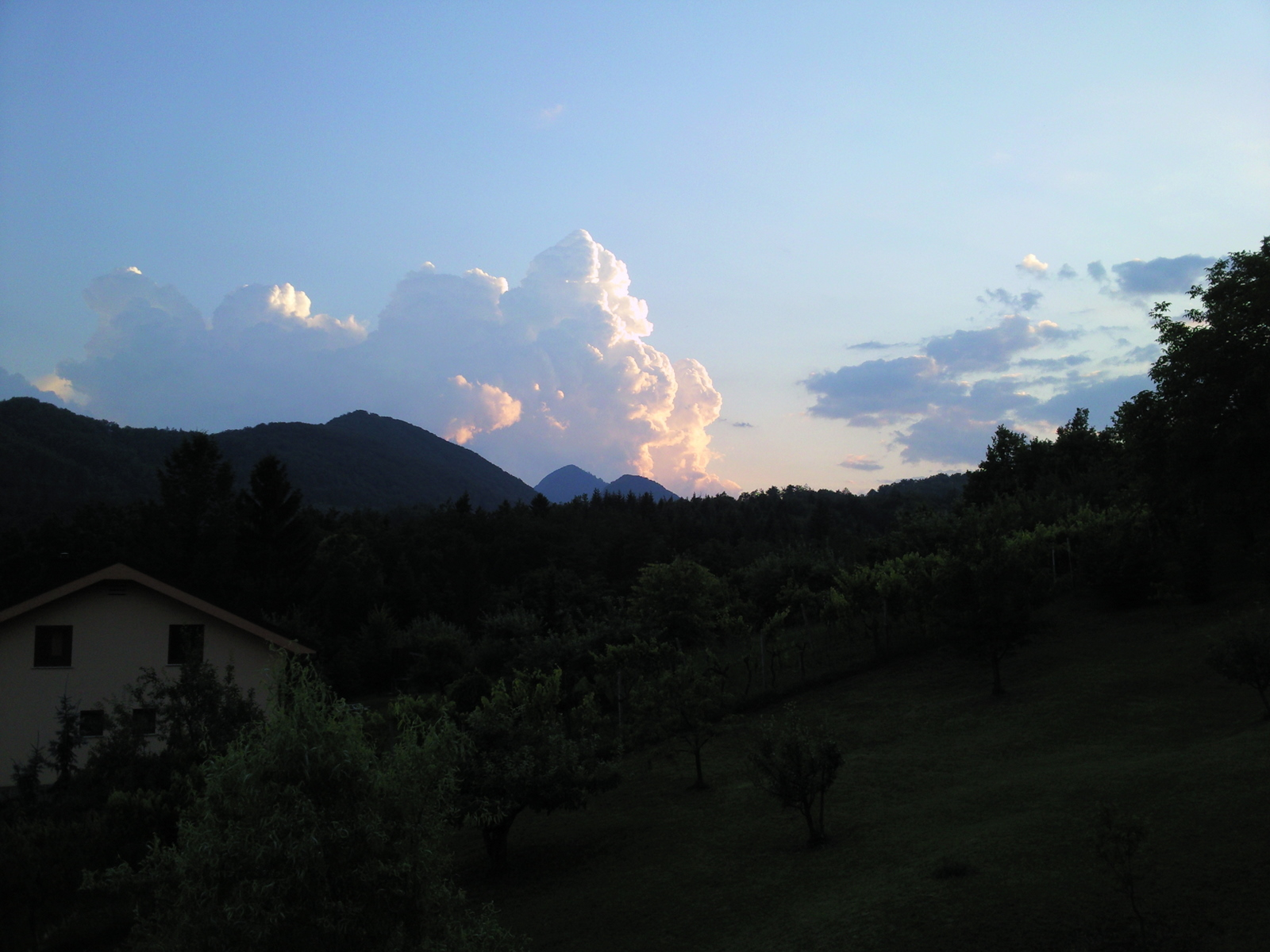
Sunset in the hills of Košnica pri Celju
