= Lopata =

- Location in Slovenia
- Coordinates: 46°15′49.78″N 15°14′7.17″E
- Country: Slovenia
- Traditional region: Styria
- Statistical region: Savinja
- Municipality: Celje

Area
  - Total: 1.72 km^{2} (0.66 sq mi)
- Elevation: 253.9 m (833 ft)

Population (2020)
  - Total: 704
  - Density: 409/km^{2} (1,060/sq mi)

Lopata (pronounced [lɔˈpaːta]) is a settlement in the City Municipality of Celje in eastern Slovenia. It lies on the northwestern outskirts of Celje. The area is part of the traditional region of Styria. It is now included with the rest of the municipality in the Savinja Statistical Region.

== Name ==
Like the village of Lopata in the Municipality of Žužemberk, the name of this village is derived from the common noun lopata (now 'shovel' but originally 'flat part/area'), referring to the level terrain of the village surrounded by hills.
