= Mass graves in Celje =

Coordinates: 46°14′09″N 15°16′03″E

Mass graves in Celje were created in Celje, Slovenia, after the Second World War, from 1945 to 1956. The 11 known mass graves in Celje itself and 14 in the immediate vicinity include some of the largest mass graves in Slovenia.

== Background ==
After the end of the war, the remaining German-speaking portion of Celje was expelled. The new communist government took advantage of existing anti-tank trenches, dug around Celje by the retreating German army, by using them as mass graves. They were filled with Croatian, Serbian, and Slovenian militia members that had collaborated with the Germans, as well as civilians that had opposed either the national liberation movement or the communist revolution during the war, civilians of German descent, or simply individuals accused or suspected of anti-communism. The bodies were buried in hidden mass graves in Celje; the exact number is still not known. At the nearby concentration camp at Teharje, some 5,000 Slovenians, hundreds of them minors, were murdered within two months after the end of the war, again without trial. Furthermore, refugee trains carrying German civilians from the Rann triangle area were halted near Celje on 5 August 1945 and their passengers sent to a concentration camp at Teharje. After the camp was closed in 1950, the local authorities established a large industrial dump over the graveyard there, concealing the evidence of killings under a mound of toxic waste. In the mid-1970s, 30 years after crimes, the local authorities built preschools, schools, apartment blocks, halls and other structures on top of the mass graves. In 1991, when it became possible again to discuss the facts pertaining to the massacre, the Slovenian government decided to build a memorial to the victims of Teharje.

== List of mass graves ==
Eleven mass graves are located in the city of Celje itself:

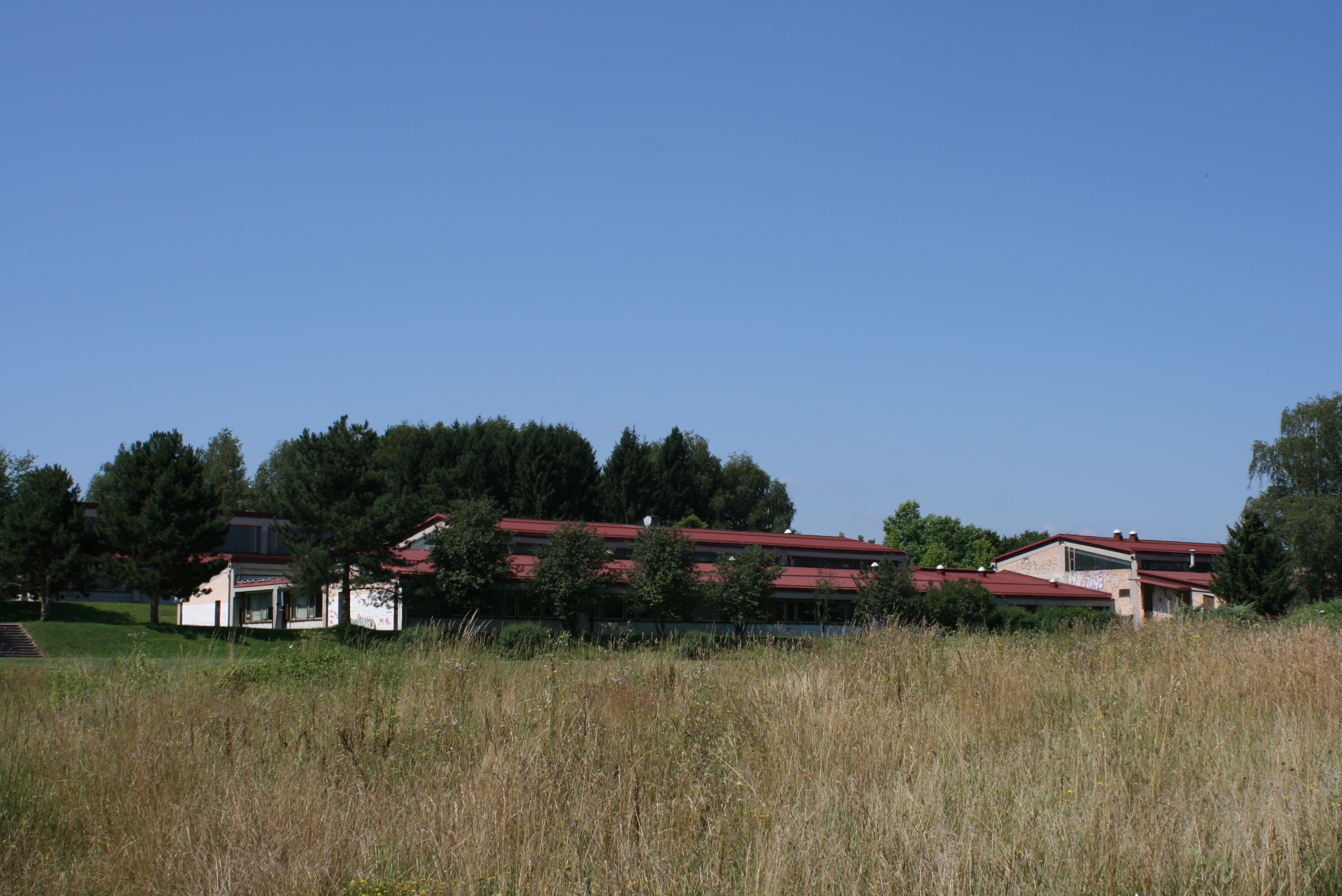
Zgornja Hudinja Mass Grave at Fran Roš Primary School

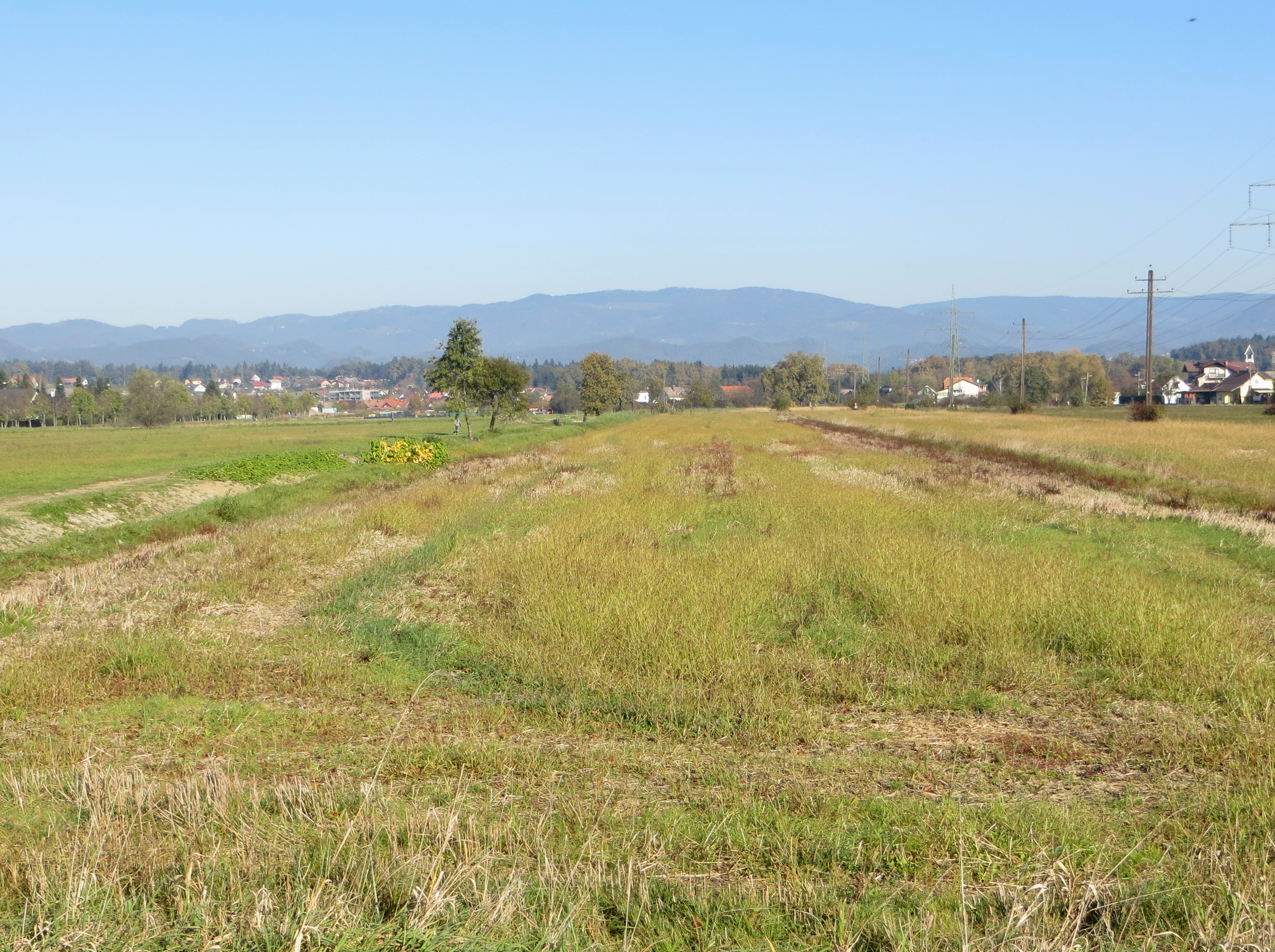
Sunny Park Mass Grave

Mass grave sites
- The Selce 1 Mass Grave (Slovene: Grobišče Selce 1), also known as the Selce Electrical Substation Mass Grave (Grobišče Trafo postaja Selce), is located on at the eastern edge of the electrical substation in the Selce neighborhood. It contains the remains of 50 to 100 victims murdered in an Informbiro purge in January 1948.
- The Selce 2 Mass Grave (Grobišče Selce 2) is located between the second and third poles on the power line from the Selce electrical substation. It contains the remains of victims murdered in the nearby forest in 1946 and 1947.
- The City Cemetery 1 Mass Grave (Grobišče na mestnem pokopališču 1) is located in a grassy area in the southern part of the city cemetery. It contains the remains of six unknown victims discovered during excavation work for the Slovenijales factory in the Medlog neighborhood.
- The City Cemetery 2 Mass Grave (Grobišče na mestnem pokopališču 2) is located at the northeast edge of the city cemetery, behind the cross by the cemetery wall. It contains the remains of victims disinterred from the city park and the city itself and reburied in 1945.
- The City Cemetery 3 Mass Grave (Grobišče na mestnem pokopališču 3) is located in the city cemetery, above the path leading from the retaining wall near the First World War graves of German soldiers to the southwest edge of the section. It contains the remains of victims disinterred from the city park and the city itself and reburied in 1945.
- The Blessed Spring Mass Grave (Grobišče Žegnani studenec) is located in the Selce neighborhood. It contains the remains of victims shot and buried here in 1946 and 1947.
- The Zgornja Hudinja Mass Grave (Grobišče Zgornja Hudinja) is located in a former anti-tank trench in a meadow east of Fran Roš Primary School in the Zgornja Hudinja neighborhood. Field excavations in September 1997 indicated that it contains the remains of at least 37 men and three women, a mix of Ustaša soldiers and civilians.
- The Klukec Mass Grave (Grobišče Klukec) is located in Spodnja Hudinja neighborhood of the city, on the east side of a building. The remains of multiple unknown victims were found here during excavation work on 20 August 1996 and were disinterred three days later.
- The Sunny Park Mass Grave (Grobišče Sončni park) is located below and east of an embankment in the north-central part of the city. It contains the remains of 50 to 100 German prisoners of war that died of disease in July and August 1956 in the nearby Lazaret building.
- The Tuma Street Mass Grave (Grobišče ob Tumovi ulici) is located on the northern edge of Celje in the Lahovšek Woods along Tuma Street (Tumova ulica). It contains the remains of four German prisoners of war and two local men murdered in June 1945.
- The Babno 19B Grave (Grob pri domačiji Babno 19 B) is located on the northwest edge of a field at the farm at Babno 19B, about 15 m from the Sušnica Canal. It contains the body of a Croat soldier that fled from the Lipovski Travnik prison camp. Locals found the body in June 1945 and buried it at the site.

== Other mass graves ==
Fourteen additional sites belonging to the same cluster of mass graves are located in neighboring Medlog (three graves), Šmarjeta pri Celju (one grave), Bukovžlak (six graves), Vrhe (one grave), Teharje (two graves), and Zvodno (one grave).
