= Dovžan Gorge =

Coordinates: 46°23′06″N 14°19′49″E

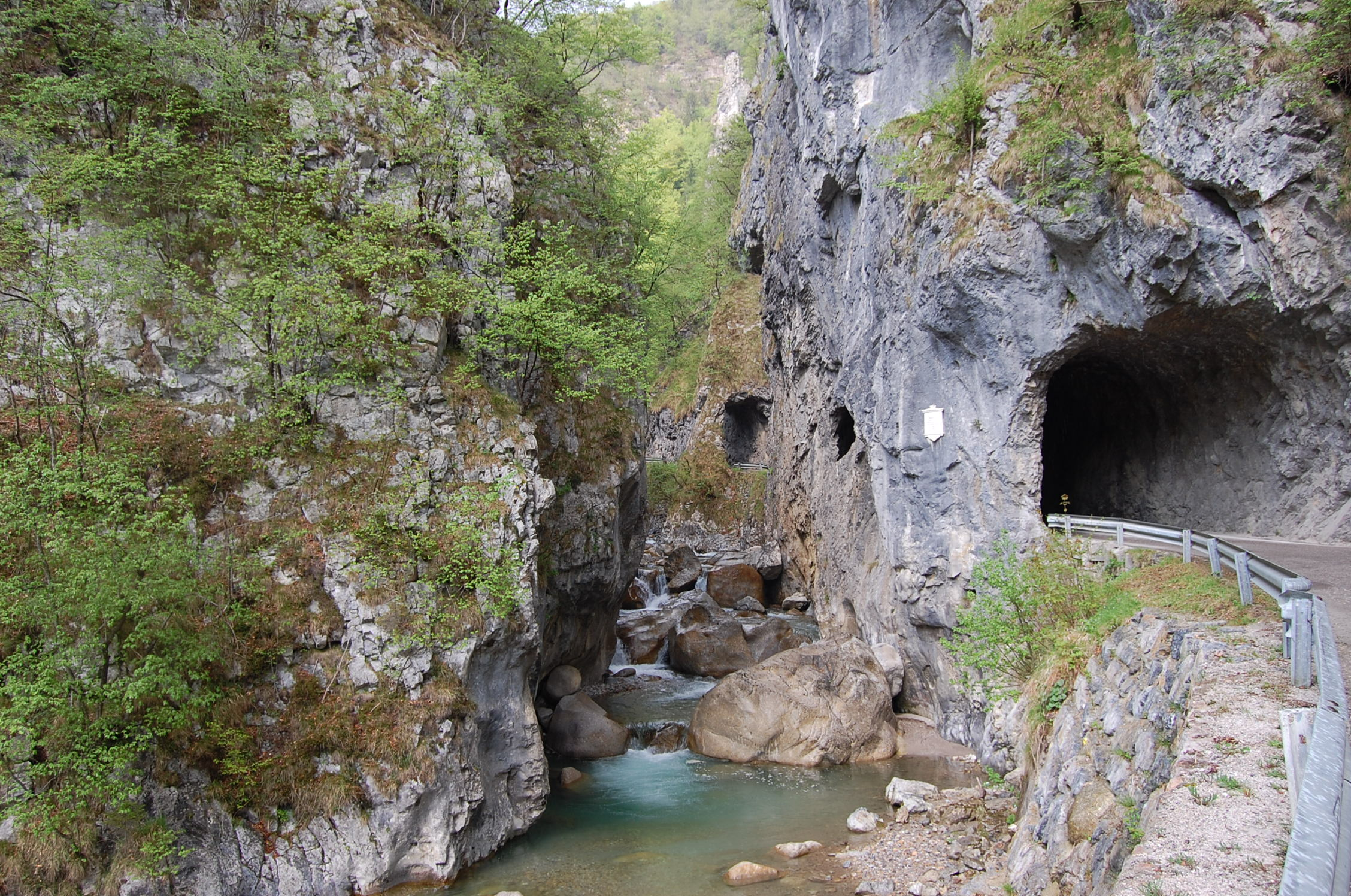
The Dovžan Gorge and road from Tržič to Jelendol

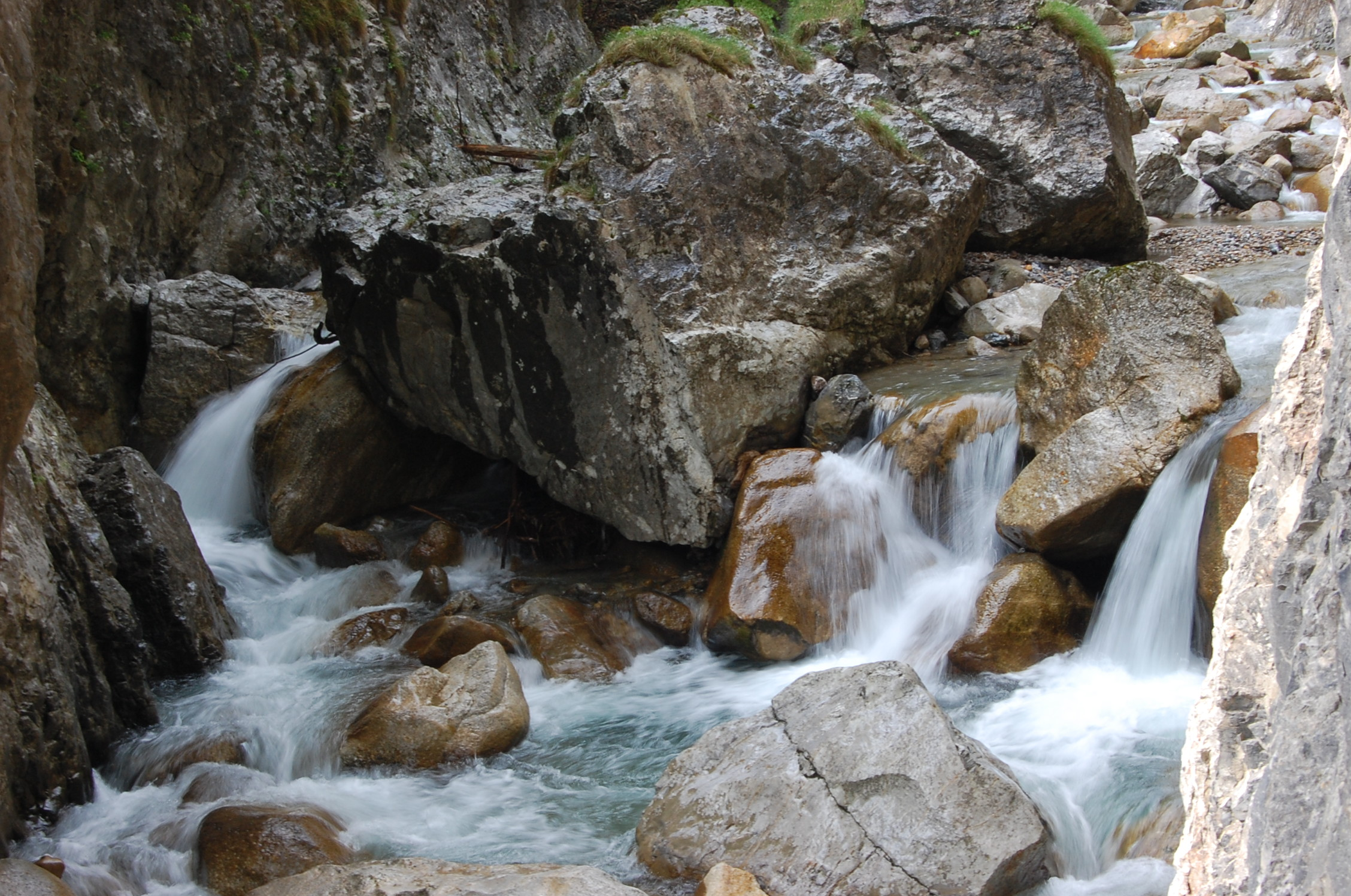
The Tržič Bistrica River flowing through the gorge

The Dovžan Gorge (Slovene: Dovžanova soteska or Dolžanova soteska) is a gorge in Slovenia that was carved by the Tržič Bistrica River. The river flows through unique waterfalls over large rounded blocks of white quartz conglomerate. These large blocks tumbled into the river from Pine Cliff (Slovene: Borova peč) above the right bank, named after the Scots pine that overgrows its steep slopes.

The gorge is picturesque because of the six high stone pillars known as the Kušpergar Towers (Slovene: Kušpegarjevi turni), where a climbing area has been set up. A geological trail, the Dovžan Gorge forest nature trail, a mountain trail, a scenic trail, and a trail to a Partisan underground press run through the gorge. In the small settlement of Čadovlje is the Jamenšnik farm with a flax drying oven (Slovene: paštba) with the year 1766 carved on it; it is an example of unique Karawanks architecture and ethnographic heritage. The gorge has been declared a natural monument of Slovenia and lies 3 kilometers (1.9 mi) north of Tržič, along the road from Tržič to Jelendol.

== Natural monument ==
The Dovžan Gorge was protected as a natural monument in 1988 due to its status as a unique site of plant and animal fossils in rocks from the Paleozoic. Numerous species of brachiopods and the foraminifer Schwagerina carniolica were first found and described in the gorge. The picturesque gorge was formed by the Tržič Bistrica River cutting through various conglomerates, limestones, sandstones, and clays. The gorge contains the largest series of barrier waterfalls in Slovenia, formed from quartz conglomerate. Pine Cliff (Slovene: Borova peč), which is overgrown with a Scots pine forest, is also composed of quartz conglomerate.

== Rock ==
=== Sandstone ===
Sandstone is the youngest stone represented in the gorge. It formed during the Lower Permian and is therefore about 250 million years old. During this period, which had a desert climate characterized by large temperature differences between day and night and little precipitation, large rocks under the influence of weather conditions disintegrated into small pieces or sand. However, when this area was flooded by the shallow sea, these particles, together with silt and clay, were consolidated into new rock.

=== Tarvisio breccia ===
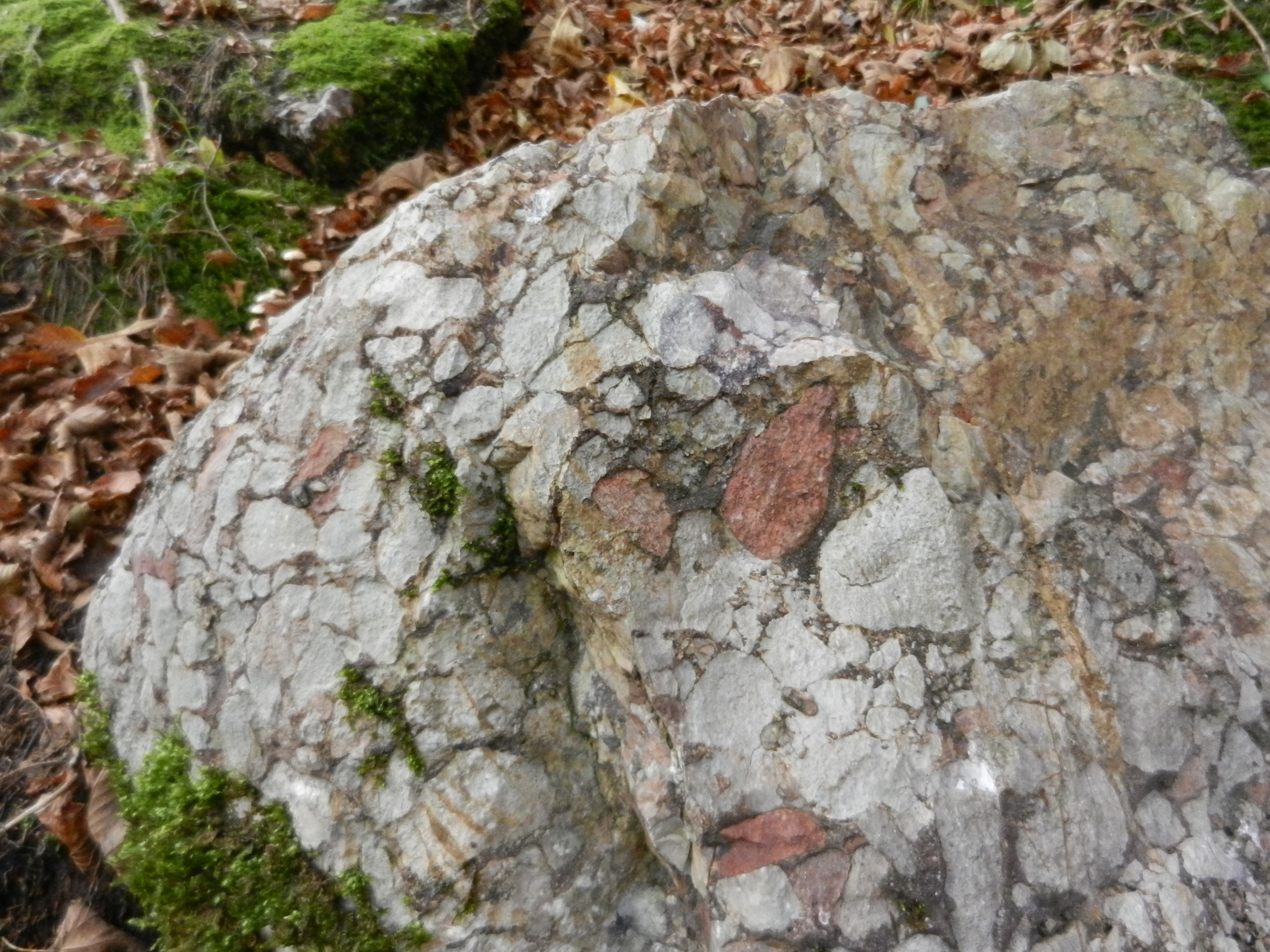
Tarvisio breccia in the Dovžan Gorge

Tarvisio breccia takes its name from Tarvisio, Italy, where the rock was first observed. It was later found that the Dovžan Gorge had large quantities of the same rock. It is slightly older than sandstone, about 260 million years old. It was formed when large areas of limestone rose above sea level. Due to strong tectonic forces, this rock was broken up and crushed. Smaller pieces accumulated in large quantities on steep banks. Due to gravity, this gravelly material repeatedly slid into the shallow sea, into which inland waters carried silt, sand, and clay. This fine material mixed with the limestone gravel to create Tarvisio breccia.

=== Limestone ===
Limestone is the only fossil-bearing rock in the Dovžan Gorge. The most typical fossils in the gorge are crinoids, algae, brachiopods, and fusulinids.

=== Quartz conglomerate ===
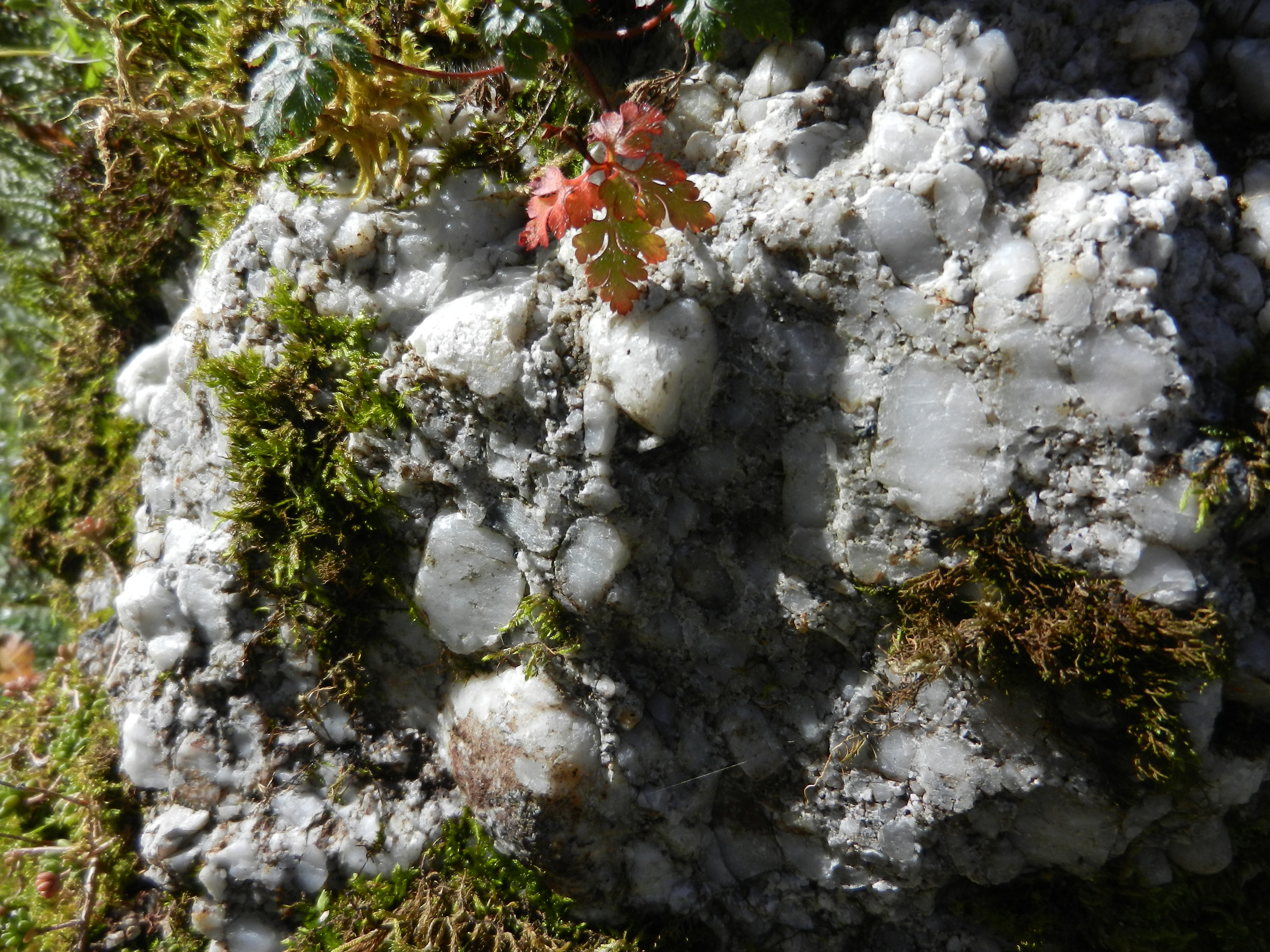
Quartz conglomerate in the Dovžan Gorge

Flint is the strongest and oldest rock in the Dovžan Gorge. Like all rocks in the gorge, this is also a sedimentary rock. It was formed in a similar manner to Tarvisio breccia. Almost 300 million years ago, the Karawanks were under a shallow sea, and rivers carried gravel, sand, and clay from the land, which later formed conglomerate. The pebbles are well rounded, indicating their long journey. They are closely packed together, and the intermediate binder is crushed quartz sand.
