= Pepelno =

- Location in Slovenia
- Coordinates: 46°18′21.38″N 15°14′2.22″E
- Country: Slovenia
- Traditional region: Styria
- Statistical region: Savinja
- Municipality: Celje

Area
  - Total: 1.45 km^{2} (0.56 sq mi)
- Elevation: 331.3 m (1,087 ft)

Population (2020)
  - Total: 101
  - Density: 69.7/km^{2} (180/sq mi)

Pepelno (pronounced [pɛˈpeːlnɔ]) is a settlement in the City Municipality of Celje in eastern Slovenia. It lies in the hills north of Celje itself. The area is part of the traditional region of Styria. It is now included with the rest of the municipality in the Savinja Statistical Region.
