= Šmartno v Rožni Dolini =

- Location in Slovenia
- Coordinates: 46°17′40.5″N 15°14′34.28″E
- Country: Slovenia
- Traditional region: Styria
- Statistical region: Savinja
- Municipality: Celje

Area
  - Total: 2.39 km^{2} (0.92 sq mi)
- Elevation: 315.7 m (1,036 ft)

Population (2020)
  - Total: 251
  - Density: 105/km^{2} (272/sq mi)

Šmartno v Rožni Dolini (pronounced [ˈʃmaːɾtnɔ w ˈɾoːʒni dɔˈliːni]; Slovene: Šmartno v Rožni dolini) is a settlement in the City Municipality of Celje in eastern Slovenia. It lies on the northern outskirts of Celje. The area is part of the traditional region of Styria. It is now included with the rest of the municipality in the Savinja Statistical Region.

The local parish church, which the settlement is named after, is dedicated to Saint Martin and belongs to the Roman Catholic Diocese of Celje. It was first mentioned in written documents dating to 1335.

Nearby Lake Šmartno (Slovene: Šmartinsko jezero) is named after the settlement.
