= Zvodno =

- Location in Slovenia
- Coordinates: 46°12′40.86″N 15°17′4.59″E
- Country: Slovenia
- Traditional region: Styria
- Statistical region: Savinja
- Municipality: Celje

Area
  - Total: 4.27 km^{2} (1.65 sq mi)
- Elevation: 331.2 m (1,087 ft)

Population (2020)
  - Total: 280
  - Density: 66/km^{2} (170/sq mi)

Zvodno (pronounced [ˈzʋoːdnɔ]) is a settlement in the City Municipality of Celje in eastern Slovenia. It lies on the southeastern outskirts of Celje. The area is part of the traditional region of Styria. It is now included with the rest of the municipality in the Savinja Statistical Region.

== Name ==
The name Zvodno is a clipped form from *Zvodno (selo) 'Zvodno village', in which the first element is an adjective derived from zvod 'confluence', referring to the geographical location of the settlement. Zvodno is located at the confluence of Devil's Creek (Slovene: Hudičev potok) and the Ločnica River.

== Mass grave ==
Zvodno is the site of a mass grave from the period immediately after the Second World War. It is part of the 25 mass graves in the Celje area. The Pečovnik Mass Grave (Slovene: Grobišče Pečovnik) is located near the house at Zvodno no. 72 in a trench that was later filled and then covered with timber, concrete, and soil, or in a shaft about 30 meters (98 ft) southwest of this trench. The shaft has a 35% grade and has also been backfilled and leveled with the terrain. The grave contains the corpses of 5,000 to 10,000 people killed or executed in May and June 1945.
