= Rožni Vrh =

- Location in Slovenia
- Coordinates: 46°18′15.35″N 15°15′30.52″E
- Country: Slovenia
- Traditional region: Styria
- Statistical region: Savinja
- Municipality: Celje

Area
  - Total: 1.71 km^{2} (0.66 sq mi)
- Elevation: 348 m (1,142 ft)

Population (2020)
  - Total: 149
  - Density: 87.1/km^{2} (226/sq mi)

Rožni Vrh (pronounced [ˈɾoːʒni ˈʋəɾx]) is a settlement in the hills north of Celje in eastern Slovenia. The area is part of the traditional region of Styria. It is now included with the rest of the City Municipality of Celje in the Savinja Statistical Region.
