= Leskovec, Celje =

Leskovec
- Location in Slovenia
- Coordinates: 46°15′15.39″N 15°18′58.86″E
- Country: Slovenia
- Traditional region: Styria
- Statistical region: Savinja
- Municipality: Celje

Area
  - Total: 1.03 km^{2} (0.40 sq mi)
- Elevation: 249.8 m (820 ft)

Population (2020)
  - Total: 223
  - Density: 217/km^{2} (561/sq mi)

Leskovec (pronounced [ˈleːskɔʋəts]) is a settlement in the City Municipality of Celje in eastern Slovenia. It lies in the eastern outskirts of Celje. The area is part of the traditional region of Styria. It is now included with the rest of the municipality in the Savinja Statistical Region.
