= Šmarjeta pri Celju =

Šmarjeta pri Celju Sveta Marjeta (until 1964)
- Location in Slovenia
- Coordinates: 46°15′34.79″N 15°17′9.23″E
- Country: Slovenia
- Traditional region: Styria
- Statistical region: Savinja
- Municipality: Celje

Area
  - Total: 0.76 km^{2} (0.29 sq mi)
- Elevation: 245.6 m (806 ft)

Population (2020)
  - Total: 206
  - Density: 270/km^{2} (700/sq mi)

Šmarjeta pri Celju (pronounced [ʃmaˈɾjéːta pɾi ˈtsɛ̀ːlju]) is a settlement in the City Municipality of Celje in eastern Slovenia. It lies on the Hudinja River in the northern outskirts of Celje. The area is part of the traditional region of Styria. It is now included with the rest of the municipality in the Savinja Statistical Region.

== Name ==
The name of the settlement was changed from Sveta Marjeta (literally, 'Saint Margaret') to Šmarjeta pri Celju in 1964. The name was changed on the basis of the 1948 Law on Names of Settlements and Designations of Squares, Streets, and Buildings as part of efforts by Slovenia's postwar communist government to remove religious elements from toponyms.

== History ==
Early settlement of the area is attested by the remains of Roman structures, including a well. The foundation of a wealthier Roman house was discovered on the western edge of the settlement, at Janžek Hill (Slovene: Janžekov grič). In the middle ages, together with neighboring Škofja Vas, Šmarjeta pri Celju was feudal property under the domain of the bishops of Gurk. The territory changed hands several times later. Fichtenhof manor (Slovene: Smrečnik) formerly stood next to the church. The church estate was eventually sold to the convent at Mekinje, then purchased by Dean Jožef von Jakomini (1755–1830) at Nova Cerkev, who in turn sold it in 1802 to nobility living in Slovenske Konjice.

=== Mass grave ===
Šmarjeta pri Celju is the site of a mass grave associated with the Second World War. It is part of the 25 mass graves in the Celje area. The Hmezad Mass Grave (Slovene: Grobišče Hmezad) lies about 225 meters (738 ft) east of the intersection in the settlement, 125 meters (410 ft) east of the bridge across the Hudinja River, where two hop fields are located. The two graves at the site contain the remains of nine German prisoners of war and 10 Russian Cossack prisoners of war, respectively.
