= Glinsko =

- Location in Slovenia
- Coordinates: 46°15′40″N 15°20′47″E
- Country: Slovenia
- Traditional region: Styria
- Statistical region: Savinja
- Municipality: Celje

Area
  - Total: 1.15 km^{2} (0.44 sq mi)
- Elevation: 296.3 m (972 ft)

Population (2020)
  - Total: 41
  - Density: 36/km^{2} (92/sq mi)

Glinsko (pronounced [ˈɡliːnskɔ]) is a settlement in the City Municipality of Celje in eastern Slovenia. It lies on the northeastern outskirts of the town of Celje. The area is part of the traditional region of Styria and is now included into the Savinja Statistical Region.
