= Dmitri Polyakov =

Soviet major general and spy (1921–1988)

Dmitri Polyakov Дмитрий Поляков
- Born: 6 July 1921; Ukrainian SSR
- Died: 15 March 1988 (aged 66); Russian SFSR, Soviet Union
- Cause of death: Execution by shooting
- Education: Frunze Military Academy
- Children: 3 (1 predeceased)
- Espionage activity
- Country: Soviet Union
- Allegiance: United States
- Agency: Red Army; GRU
- Active: 1941–1946 (Red Army); 1951–1980 (GRU)
- Rank: Major General
- Codename: Bourbon, Roam, Tophat

Dmitri Fyodorovich Polyakov (Russian: Дмитрий Фёдорович Поляков; 6 July 1921 – 15 March 1988) was a major general in the Soviet GRU during the Cold War. According to former high-level KGB officer Sergey Kondrashev, Polyakov acted as a KGB disinformation agent at the FBI's New York City field office when he was posted at United Nations headquarters in 1962. Kondrashev's post-Cold War friend and former high-level CIA counterintelligence officer Tennent H. Bagley says Polyakov "flipped" and started spying for the CIA when he was reposted to Rangoon, Moscow, and New Delhi. Polyakov was suddenly recalled to Moscow in 1980, arrested in 1986, tried, and finally executed in 1988.

In the CIA, Polyakov was known by code names "Bourbon" and "Roam", while the FBI referred to him as "Tophat".

== Early life ==
Dmitri Polyakov was born in Soviet Ukraine in 1921, the son of a bookkeeper. He graduated from Sumy Artillery School in June 1941 and served as an artillery officer during the Second World War, during which time he was decorated for bravery.

After completing his studies at the M. V. Frunze Military Academy and GRU Training Courses, Polyakov joined the Soviet Union's foreign military intelligence agency, the GRU. Polyakov's first mission was with the Soviet delegation to the Military Staff Committee at the United Nations from 1951 to 1956, directing a ring of Soviet spies. His follow-up overseas assignments included Rangoon (1965–1969) and New Delhi (1973–1976 and 1979–1980), where he was posted as Soviet Military Attaché.

== GRU officer and double agent ==
On his second assignment to New York in 1959–1961, Polyakov approached counterintelligence agents of the Federal Bureau of Investigation (FBI) to offer his services as an informant. Polyakov maintained that he was a Russian patriot, motivated to become a double agent because of his disgust with the corruption of the Communist Party elite. His CIA contact from New Delhi believed that Polyakov's service in World War II was a factor in his decision to become a double agent, while another CIA agent who handled his case for fifteen years said: "He articulated a sense that he had to help us out or the Soviets were going to win the cold war, and he couldn't stand that. He felt we were very naive and we were going to fail." Victor Cherkashin suggested that Polyakov was embittered because Soviet leadership denied him permission to take his seriously ill son, the eldest of three, to a hospital in New York where he could get adequate medical attention for polio. His son died as a result of the illness and, soon after, Polyakov approached the Americans.

Former CIA counterintelligence officer Tennent H. Bagley argues—in his 2007 book Spy Wars: Moles, Mysteries and Deadly Games and elsewhere—that Polyakov was a Kremlin-loyal triple agent when he contacted the FBI in late 1961. Bagley further argues that Polyakov and another Soviet intelligence officer, Major Aleksei Kulak, who literally walked in to the Bureau's New York City field office a few weeks after Polyakov, provided U.S. intelligence agencies with KGB disinformation that sent the agencies on "wild goose chases" and deflected attention from KGB/GRU false-defectors and true "moles" in U.S. intelligence.

About a year after his initial contact with the FBI, Polyakov was posted back to Moscow where he was able to access GRU documents to identify double agents, exposing Frank Bossard, a guided-missile researcher in the British aviation ministry, and United States Army Sergeant Jack Dunlap, a courier at the National Security Agency. In the late 1960s, while stationed in Rangoon, Polyakov gave the CIA all the intel the GRU had on both the Vietnamese and Chinese military. Around this time he also passed on information about the (alleged) growing Sino-Soviet split, which would later be used by Henry Kissinger and Richard Nixon in their opening of relations with China in 1972.

In his books Spy Wars and Spymaster: Startling Cold War Revelations of a Soviet KGB Chief, and his article "Ghosts of the Spy Wars", Bagley says he was told by former high-level KGB officer Sergey A. Kondrashev that Polyakov was sent in early 1962 to the FBI's New York City field office to feed disinformation to it, and that he did so until he returned to Moscow in late 1962. Bagley says Polyakov was recruited by the CIA in 1966 after he was posted to Rangoon, Burma, and that he spied for the Agency from then until he was recalled from New Delhi, India, to Moscow in 1980, at which time he disappeared from the CIA's "radar." Bagley says Kondrashev told him that Polyakov was uncovered because he was telling the CIA more than he was supposed to, which led Bagley to wonder which of the few people who knew about the operation had betrayed Polyakov to the KGB.

== Arrest and execution ==
Polyakov was arrested by the KGB in 1986, six years after his retirement from the GRU. His contacts at the CIA had no information about what had happened to him. Only later did it become clear that he may have been betrayed by two moles for the Soviets: Robert Hanssen in the FBI and Aldrich Ames in the CIA. In 1988, Polyakov was sentenced to death for treason, and subsequently executed.

== Legacy ==
According to the official story, Polyakov remained a CIA informant for twenty-five years as he rose through the ranks, eventually becoming a general. CIA officers speak in superlatives about the kind of information he provided. CIA officer Jeanne Vertefeuille said, "He didn't do this for money. He insisted on staying in place to help us. It was a bad day for us when we lost him." Polyakov insisted on being paid only $3,000 a year and accepted this payment mostly in the form of power tools along with fishing and hunting equipment. Sandy Grimes said that Polyakov was "the best source at least to my knowledge that American intelligence has ever had and I would submit, although I certainly can't be certain, but the best source that any intelligence service has ever had." She also noted, "This was a man of tremendous courage...In the end, we won. The Cold War is over and the Soviet Union was dissolved." Former CIA director James Woolsey said, "Polyakov was the jewel in the crown" and in a 2001 interview he told a reporter, "What Gen. Polyakov did for the West didn't just help us win the Cold War...it kept the Cold War from becoming hot."

Some CIA and FBI officials, including Deputy Director William Sullivan, believed that, at some point, Polyakov was turned by the Soviets and made into a triple agent who deceived the West with disinformation. Others, like former Soviet Russia Division Counterintelligence Chief Tennent H. Bagley (mentioned above) later came to believe that Polyakov had been a KGB agent in the U.S. in 1962, and that he later "flipped" and became a spy for the CIA when he was posted abroad.

Among the important information Polyakov provided:

- Evidence of the rift between the Soviet Union and China. This information played a crucial role in Richard Nixon's decision to open diplomatic relations with China in 1972.
- Technical data on Soviet-made antitank missiles. While the US never fought the Soviet Union directly, knowledge of these weapons proved invaluable when Iraq employed them in the Gulf War.
- Proof that British Intelligence official Frank Bossard was a mole for the USSR.

== See also ==
- Maria Dobrova – Soviet military intelligence officer
