= Osenca =

- Location in Slovenia
- Coordinates: 46°13′0.26″N 15°17′16.82″E
- Country: Slovenia
- Traditional region: Styria
- Statistical region: Savinja
- Municipality: Celje

Area
  - Total: 0.61 km^{2} (0.24 sq mi)
- Elevation: 312 m (1,024 ft)

Population (2020)
  - Total: 93
  - Density: 150/km^{2} (390/sq mi)

Osenca (pronounced [ˈoːsɛntsa]; in older sources also Osenica) is a settlement in the City Municipality of Celje in eastern Slovenia. It lies on the southeastern outskirts of Celje. The area is part of the traditional region of Styria. It is now included with the rest of the municipality in the Savinja Statistical Region.
