= Začret =

- Location in Slovenia
- Coordinates: 46°14′47.17″N 15°19′12.23″E
- Country: Slovenia
- Traditional region: Styria
- Statistical region: Savinja
- Municipality: Celje

Area
  - Total: 0.77 km^{2} (0.30 sq mi)
- Elevation: 250 m (820 ft)

Population (2020)
  - Total: 358
  - Density: 460/km^{2} (1,200/sq mi)

Začret (pronounced [zaˈtʃɾeːt]) is a small settlement in the City Municipality of Celje in eastern Slovenia. It lies on the eastern outskirts of Celje, east of Trnovlje. The area is part of the traditional region of Styria. It is now included with the rest of the municipality in the Savinja Statistical Region.
