= Runtole =

- Location in Slovenia
- Coordinates: 46°16′30.95″N 15°16′16.27″E
- Country: Slovenia
- Traditional region: Styria
- Statistical region: Savinja
- Municipality: Celje

Area
  - Total: 1.05 km^{2} (0.41 sq mi)
- Elevation: 257.6 m (845 ft)

Population (2020)
  - Total: 41
  - Density: 39/km^{2} (100/sq mi)

Runtole (pronounced [ˈɾuːntɔlɛ]) is a settlement in the City Municipality of Celje in eastern Slovenia. It lies in the hills north of Celje, next to Lake Šmartno. The area is part of the traditional region of Styria. It is now included with the rest of the municipality in the Savinja Statistical Region.

== Name ==
Runtole was attested in historical sources as Landoll in 1458 (and as Londol in 1464); compare Landol. The Slovene name is an archaic locative form of the German compound Rundtal 'rounded valley', referring to the local geography.
