= Rupe, Celje =

Rupe
- Location in Slovenia
- Coordinates: 46°18′39.84″N 15°14′2.3″E
- Country: Slovenia
- Traditional region: Styria
- Statistical region: Savinja
- Municipality: Celje

Area
  - Total: 1.34 km^{2} (0.52 sq mi)
- Elevation: 391.1 m (1,283 ft)

Population (2020)
  - Total: 87
  - Density: 65/km^{2} (170/sq mi)

Rupe (pronounced [ˈɾuːpɛ]) is a small settlement in the City Municipality of Celje in eastern Slovenia. It lies in the hills on the northern outskirts of Celje. The area is part of the traditional region of Styria. It is now included with the rest of the municipality in the Savinja Statistical Region.

== Rabensberg Castle ==
The castle ruins of Rabensberg Castle (Slovene: Ravni Breg, Ranšberg) are in Rupe. The castle was built in the 12th century by the Knights of Rabensberg, the ministeriales of the Diocese of Gurk. In the 1370s, it became property of the Lords of Ptuj, and in 1438 it was inherited by the Counts of Schauenburg, the adversaries of the Counts of Celje. In 1452 the Counts of Celje burned it.
