= Tržič Bistrica =

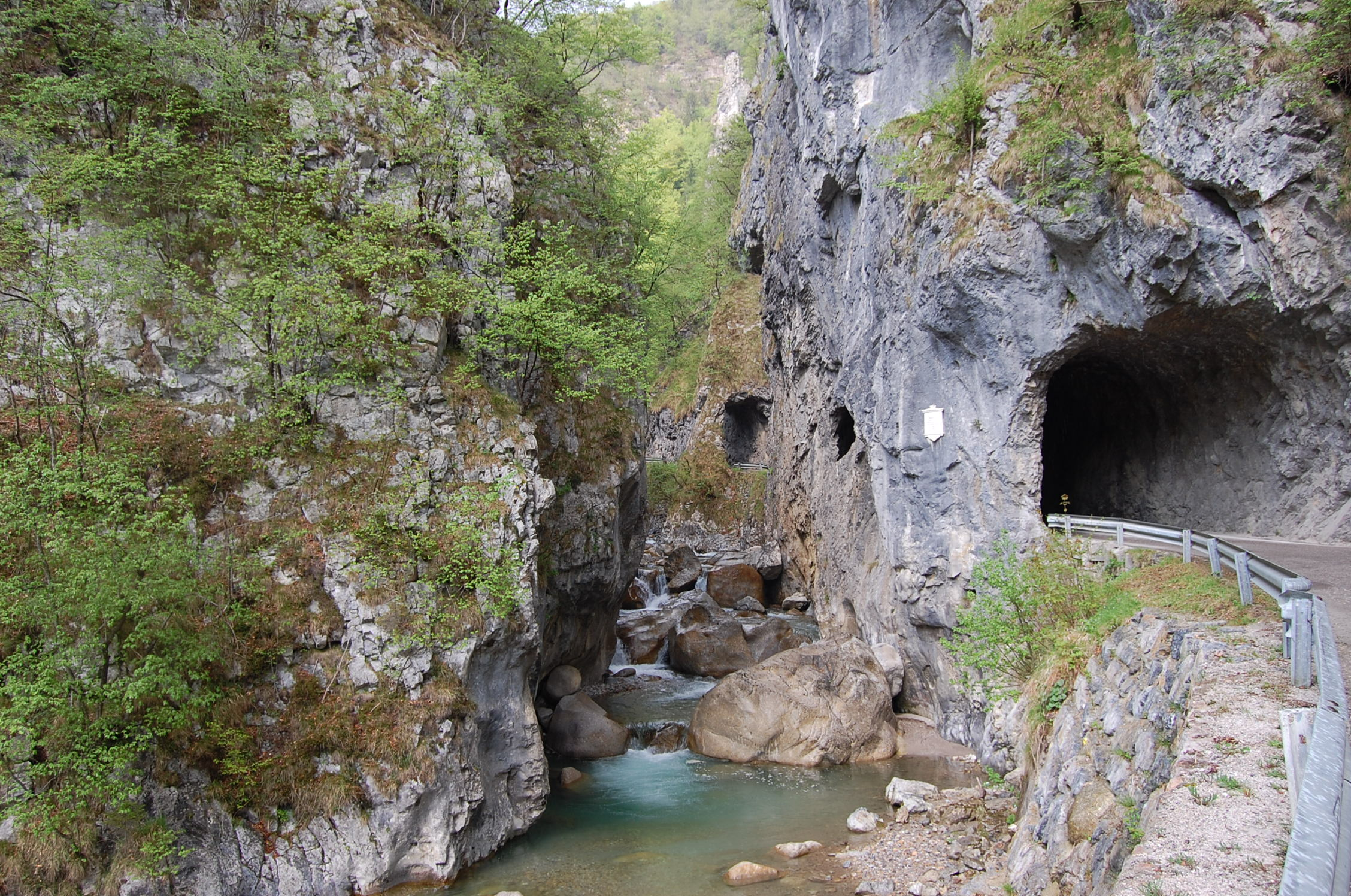
- The Tržič Bistrica in the Dovžan Gorge

Location
- Country: Slovenia

Physical characteristics
- Source
  - location: above Jelendol, Karawanks
  - elevation: 1,460 m (4,790 ft)
- Mouth
  - location: the Sava, near Podbrezje
  - coordinates: 46.2793°N 14.2666°E
  - elevation: 370 m (1,210 ft)
- Length: 27 km (17 mi)
- Basin size: 146 km^{2} (56 sq mi)

Basin features
- Progression: Sava→ Danube→ Black Sea

The Tržič Bistrica (Slovene: Tržiška Bistrica) is a river in Upper Carniola, Slovenia. The river is 27 kilometres (17 mi) in length. It starts in the Karawanks, runs through the Dovžan Gorge and the town of Tržič, and joins the Sava near the village of Podbrezje.
