= Jelendol, Tržič =

Jelendol Puterhof (until 1955)
- Village
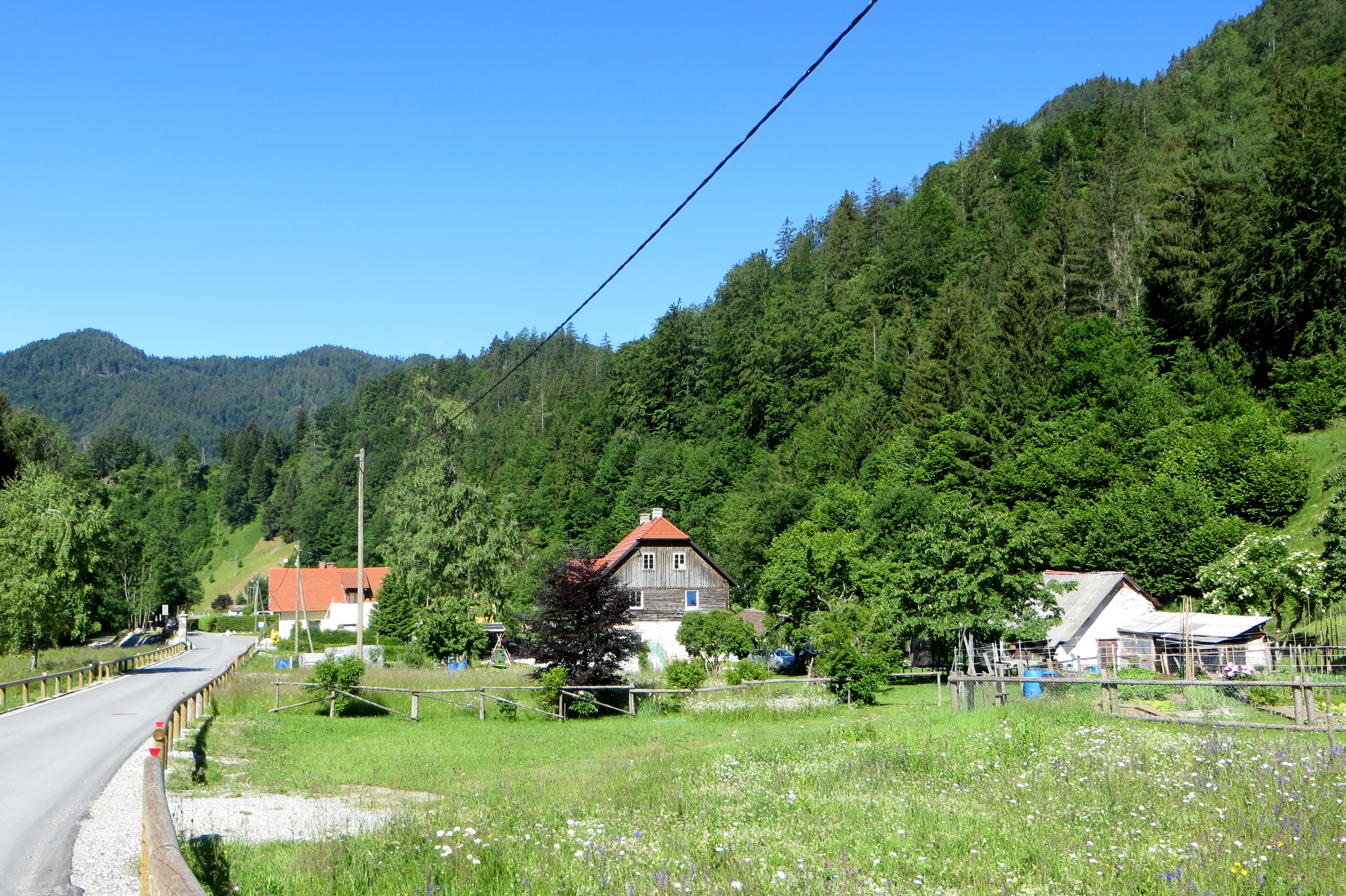

- Location in Slovenia
- Coordinates: 46°23′55.63″N 14°20′42.36″E
- Country: Slovenia
- Traditional region: Upper Carniola
- Statistical region: Upper Carniola
- Municipality: Tržič
- Elevation: 766.5 m (2,515 ft)

Population (2002)
  - Total: 170

Jelendol (pronounced [ˈjɛːlɛndɔl]) is a settlement on the banks of the Tržič Bistrica River in the Municipality of Tržič in the Upper Carniola region of Slovenia.

== Name ==
Until 1955, the village was called Puterhof. The origin of the name Puterhof (also attested as Putterhof and Putrhof) is unknown, but a folk story derives it from German Butterhof (i.e., 'butter farm'), relating that so much butter was produced there that a fire at the farm caused the butter to melt and run down the hill toward the mill on the creek.

In the early 1950s, editorials were published stating that it was necessary to change the name of the village because of its presumed German origin. Suggestions for a new name included Košutnik, Podkošutnik, Žagarji, Jelengaj, and Jelendol. The name of the settlement was changed to Jelendol in 1955 on the basis of the 1948 Law on Names of Settlements and Designations of Squares, Streets, and Buildings as part of efforts by Slovenia's postwar communist government to remove German elements from toponyms. However, the name Puterhof remained in popular use, and it was still condemned decades later as an "ugly Germanism" (Slovene: grd germanizem). The name Jelendol is a compound derived from jelen 'deer' and dol 'valley', thus 'deer valley'. Compare Landol for a name with the same semantic motivation.
