= Urban Municipality of Celje =

Urban municipality of Slovenia

Urban Municipality of Celje Mestna občina Celje
- City municipality
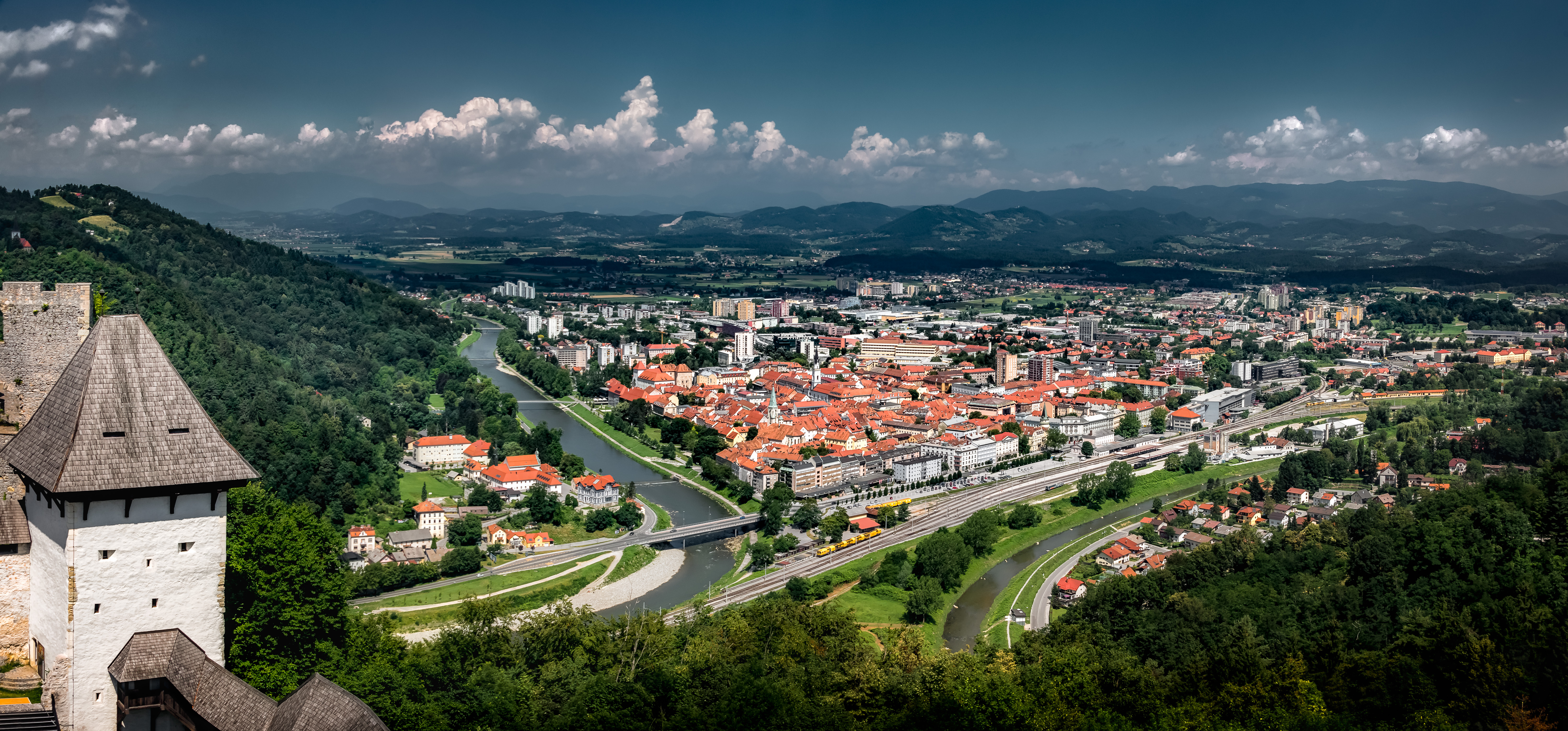

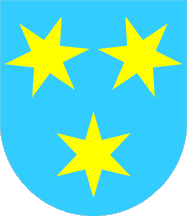
- Coat of arms

- Location of the Urban Municipality of Celje in Slovenia
- Coordinates: 46°14′N 15°16′E
- Country: Slovenia

Government
  - Mayor: Matija Kovač (Levica)

Area
  - Total: 94.9 km^{2} (36.6 sq mi)

Population (2018)
  - Total: 49,538
  - Density: 522/km^{2} (1,350/sq mi)
- Time zone: UTC+01 (CET)
  - Summer (DST): UTC+02 (CEST)
- Website: www.celje.si

The Urban Municipality of Celje (pronounced [ˈtsɛ̀ːljɛ]; Slovene: Mestna občina Celje) is one of twelve urban municipalities in Slovenia. Its seat is the city of Celje, a regional center of Styria.

== Settlements ==
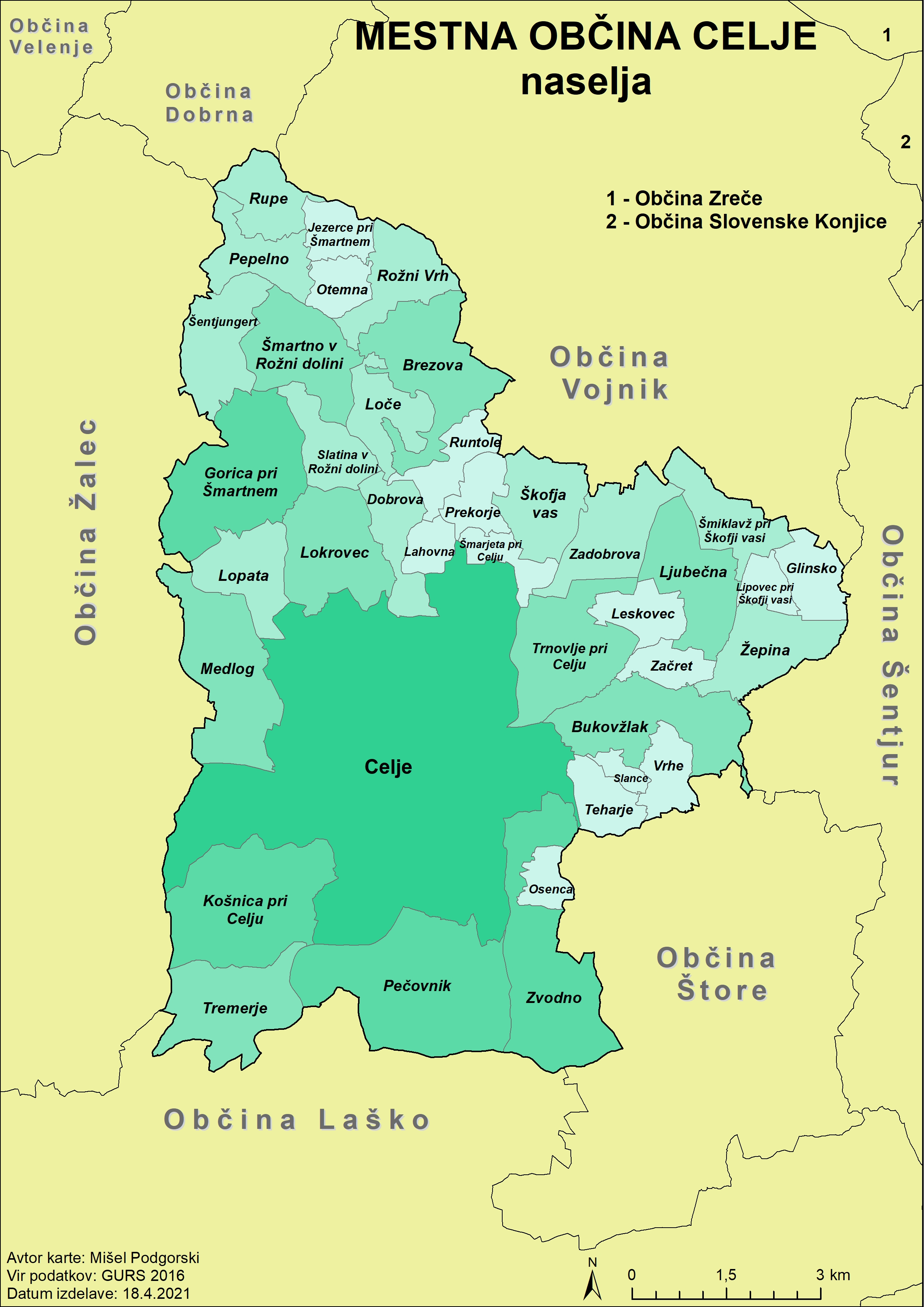
Villages in the municipality

In addition to the municipal seat of Celje, the municipality also includes the following settlements:

- Brezova
- Bukovžlak
- Dobrova
- Glinsko
- Gorica pri Šmartnem
- Jezerce pri Šmartnem
- Košnica pri Celju
- Lahovna
- Leskovec
- Lipovec pri Škofji Vasi
- Ljubečna
- Loče
- Lokrovec
- Lopata
- Medlog
- Osenca
- Otemna
- Pečovnik
- Pepelno
- Prekorje
- Rožni Vrh
- Runtole
- Rupe
- Šentjungert
- Škofja Vas
- Slance
- Slatina v Rožni Dolini
- Šmarjeta pri Celju
- Šmartno v Rožni Dolini
- Šmiklavž pri Škofji Vasi
- Teharje
- Tremerje
- Trnovlje pri Celju
- Vrhe
- Začret
- Zadobrova
- Žepina
- Zvodno

== Other reading ==
- Orožen, Janko (1971). Zgodovina Celja in okolice, 1. del (History of Celje and surroundings) (in Celjski zbornik ed.). Celje: Kulturna skupnost v Celju. 3285761.
