= Trnovlje pri Celju =

Trnovlje pri Celju Trnovlje (until 1953)
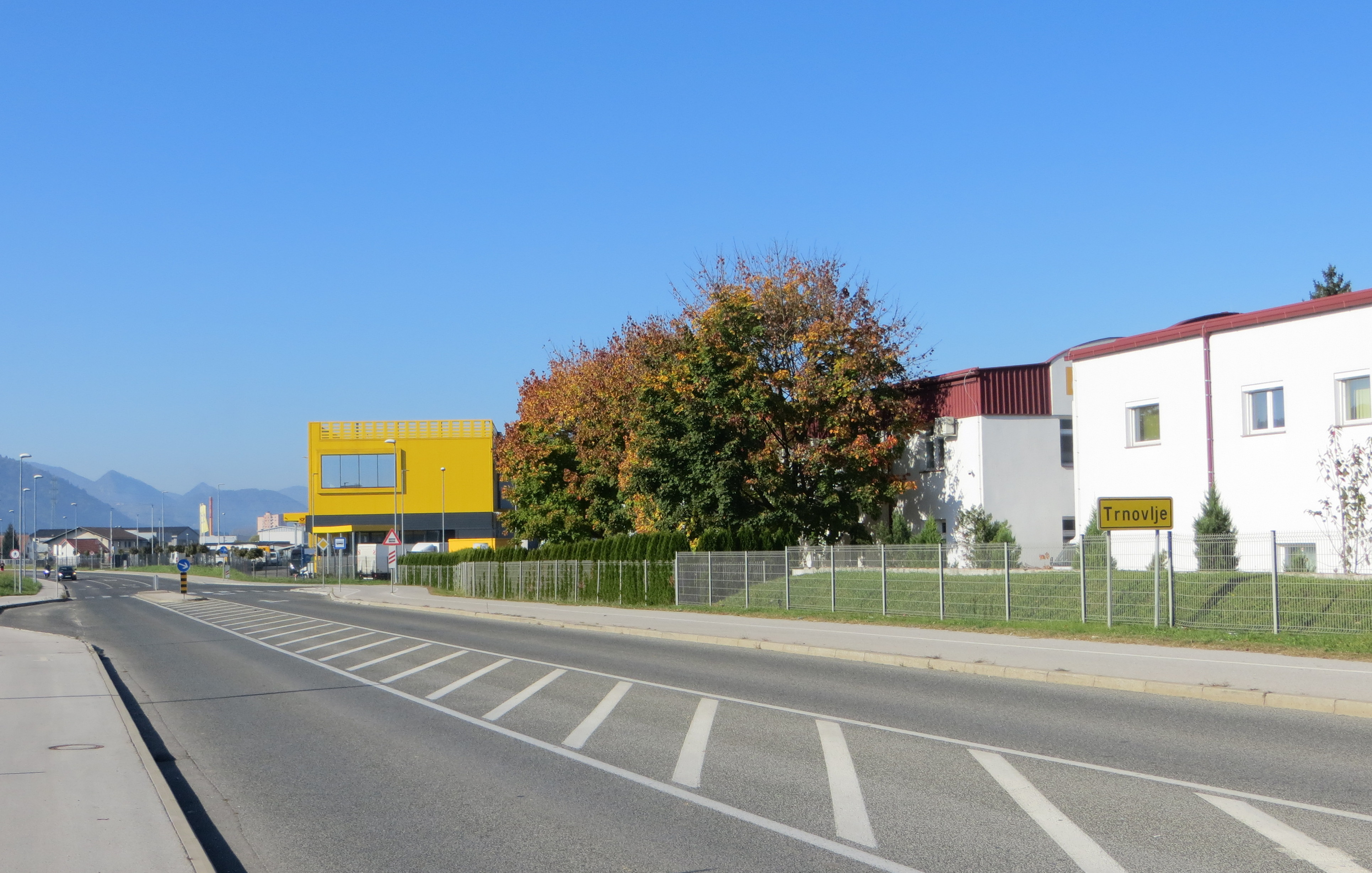

- Location in Slovenia
- Coordinates: 46°15′8.49″N 15°17′34.77″E
- Country: Slovenia
- Traditional region: Styria
- Statistical region: Savinja
- Municipality: Celje

Area
  - Total: 3.06 km^{2} (1.18 sq mi)
- Elevation: 244.8 m (803 ft)

Population (2020)
  - Total: 1,409
  - Density: 460/km^{2} (1,190/sq mi)

Trnovlje pri Celju (pronounced [təɾˈnoːu̯ljɛ pɾi ˈtsɛ̀ːlju]) is a settlement in the City Municipality of Celje in eastern Slovenia. It lies in the northeastern suburbs of Celje itself. The area is part of the traditional region of Styria. It is now included with the rest of the municipality in the Savinja Statistical Region.

== Name ==
The name of the settlement was changed from Trnovlje to Trnovlje pri Celju in 1953.
