= Maria Dobrova =

Soviet agent

- Мария Доброва
- Born: 1907; Minsk, Belarus
- Died: June 1962 (aged 54–55); Chicago, United States
- Cause of death: Suicide
- Education: Leningrad State University
- Awards: Order of the Red Star
- Espionage activity
- Allegiance: Soviet Union
- Service branch: GRU
- Service years: 1951–1962
- Rank: Captain
- Codename: Macy
- Codename: Christina

Maria Dmitriyevna Dobrova (Russian: Мария Дмитриевна Доброва; 1907-1962) was a Soviet military intelligence officer, Captain of the Soviet Army, and GRU officer who worked illegally in the United States.

== Early life ==
Maria Dobrova was born in Minsk, Belarus in 1907. She worked as a translator for the Soviet military advisers during the Spanish Civil War of 1936 to 1939.

== Career ==
Dobrova worked as a nurse at the hospital during World War II in Leningrad and worked by referent in the Soviet Embassy in Colombia from 1946 to 1950.

In 1951 she was invited to work in the Main Intelligence Directorate of Soviet Army (GRU).

After special training, she went by the name of Glen Morrero Podtseski in the United States in May 1954. In New York City, she opened her fitness facilities. In a short time the salon become a very popular institution. Her beauty salon in New York was visited by wives of American politicians and businessmen.

During her stay in the U.S., she recruited several agents. Her GRU handler Dmitri Polyakov, who was posted in New York and secretly worked for the FBI, passed information about her to FBI agents in June 1962. When FBI agents entered her hotel room in Chicago, Maria refused to surrender and jumped from the balcony of the hotel in June 1962.

For 26 years, Soviet authorities knew nothing about her fate, until after the arrest of Polyakov in Moscow in July 1986.
