= Dobrova, Celje =

Dobrova Zgornja Dobrova (until 1982)
- Location in Slovenia
- Coordinates: 46°16′7.08″N 15°15′34.59″E
- Country: Slovenia
- Traditional region: Styria
- Statistical region: Savinja
- Municipality: Celje

Area
  - Total: 1.36 km^{2} (0.53 sq mi)
- Elevation: 262.9 m (863 ft)

Population (2020)
  - Total: 211
  - Density: 155/km^{2} (402/sq mi)

Dobrova (pronounced [ˈdoːbɾɔʋa]) is a settlement in the City Municipality of Celje in eastern Slovenia. It lies on the northern outskirts of the town of Celje. The area is part of the traditional region of Styria. It is now included in the Savinja Statistical Region.

== Name ==
The name of the settlement was changed from Zgornja Dobrova to Dobrova in 1982.
