= Frank Bossard =

British civil servant and Soviet spy (1912–2001)

Frank Clifton Bossard
- Born: 13 December 1912; Driffield, East Yorkshire, UK
- Died: 19 June 2001 (aged 88); Kingston upon Hull, UK
- Occupation: Telecommunications officer
- Espionage activity
- Allegiance: Soviet Union
- Service branch: Royal Air Force
- Rank: Flight Lieutenant

Frank Clifton Bossard (13 December 1912 – 19 June 2001) was a British Secret Intelligence Service officer who provided classified documents to the Soviet Union in the 1960s.

== Early life ==
Bossard was born in 1912 to a poor single mother, Ethel Bossard (née Clifton). His father, Frank Bossard, a journeyman joiner, died before he was born. His mother worked as a housekeeper and general store manager in Gedney, Lincolnshire until 1923, when she married a farmer and moved to the country. Bossard dropped out of school when his stepfather could no longer afford it and became a store clerk. Despite his lack of education, Bossard became interested in radios, building his first one at sixteen.

In the 1930s, Bossard joined the British Union of Fascists, but felt himself out of place among people whom he regarded as upper-class. Eventually, he saved enough money to attend radio technology courses at Norwich Technical College. When he ran out of money, he was arrested for attempting to cash a forged cheque in 1934. Bossard served six months hard labour, a fact he suppressed throughout most of his career.

Bossard married his first wife, Ethel Isobel Brash, on 26 February 1941 at St Simon's Parish Church, Southsea.

== RAF and Ministry of Civil Aviation ==
Bossard joined the Royal Air Force in 1939, and fought in the Mediterranean and Middle East Theatre. He gained an officer's commission with a false CV. Later, he was transferred to a radar unit, where he had become a Flight Lieutenant by 1946. He taught briefly at the Air Service College before the Ministry of Aviation offered him a post as an assistant signals officer. He was eventually promoted to the position of staff telecommunications officer.

== MI6 ==
In 1951, Bossard accepted a position as senior officer with the Ministry's Scientific and Technical Intelligence Branch in Germany. Five years later, the Secret Intelligence Service (MI6) recruited Bossard, stationing him at the Embassy in Bonn, West Germany. In Bonn, Bossard had the duty of interviewing scientists, engineers, and technicians, who had left the Soviet Union. MI6 provided Bossard with a large entertainment allowance, which he used to take his interviewees to strip clubs and brothels. He began drinking heavily at this time.

== Espionage ==
In 1961, Bossard returned to London to work at the Ministry of Aviation. Though he no longer received an entertainment allowance, Bossard maintained his habits. Soviet agents concluded that he had access to secret documents on guided missiles, had financial issues, and possessed multiple weaknesses of character. Soon after his return to London, Bossard was approached by a man who called himself Gordon. After a few nights in a local bar, Gordon revealed that he was a Soviet agent working at the Embassy and offered Bossard a £250 advance for his agreement to deliver documents to Soviet agents. Bossard was given nine dead drops around the city. He was instructed to listen to Radio Moscow at 7:45 a.m. and 8:30 p.m. on the first Tuesday and Wednesday of each month. One of five popular Russian songs would be played and Bossard was to proceed differently according to which one was broadcast—The Volga Boat Song, for instance, indicated that an operation was to be abandoned. Bossard routinely took classified documents, mostly involving missile systems and radar systems, from his office, photographed them in his hotel room during his lunch break, using equipment he left in a briefcase in the left luggage office at London Waterloo station, and returned the documents the next day. For every packet of photographs delivered, he received £2,000. Bossard later told authorities that he had received £5,000 in total.

When Bossard went on spending binges, he caught the attention of MI5. Suspicions were confirmed when the Soviet double agent Dmitri Polyakov (known as TOPHAT) provided information about Bossard's activities. Another agent known as NICNAC also provided the Central Intelligence Agency with information regarding Bossard. After weeks of surveillance and an investigation into his finances, Bossard was arrested on 12 March 1965 in the Ivanhoe Hotel in Bloomsbury, where he had been photographing documents. Though the information was suppressed at the time, Bossard was the first spy caught with the use of an electronic transmitter. These transmitters were placed on the clips of classified documents, which were then followed to Bossard's desk, and eventually to the hotel he was using.

Bossard was charged with violating the Official Secrets Act and received a trial at the Old Bailey on 10 May 1965, where he confessed and was sentenced to 21 years in prison. Lord Chief Justice Hubert Parker informed Bossard: "It would be longer, and I emphasise this, but for the fact that you are now 52 years of age and that you have shown a degree of remorse by making a full confession extending far beyond the matters in respect of which you are charged". At the time, Bossard's sentence was the third longest resulting from a postwar spy trial. Following Bossard's case, officials began reforming the qualifications of those who handled classified documents and how espionage cases were handled if they occurred. While in prison, Bossard was divorced by his wife, Ethel.

== Later life ==
After being released early from prison in 1975, Bossard changed his name to Frank Russell Clifton and found employment with Bird and Clarke, a firm of solicitors. He soon married again. Frank Clifton died of natural causes in Hull on 19 June 2001.
