= Loče, Celje =

Loče
- Location in Slovenia
- Coordinates: 46°17′7.99″N 15°15′26″E
- Country: Slovenia
- Traditional region: Styria
- Statistical region: Savinja
- Municipality: Celje

Area
  - Total: 1.43 km^{2} (0.55 sq mi)
- Elevation: 293.3 m (962 ft)

Population (2020)
  - Total: 117
  - Density: 81.8/km^{2} (212/sq mi)

Loče (pronounced [ˈloːtʃɛ]) is a small settlement in the City Municipality of Celje in eastern Slovenia. It lies on the northern outskirts of Celje, next to Lake Šmartno. The area is part of the traditional region of Styria. It is now included with the rest of the municipality in the Savinja Statistical Region.
