= Jezerce pri Šmartnem =

Jezerce pri Šmartnem Jezerce (until 1953)
- Location in Slovenia
- Coordinates: 46°18′33.92″N 15°14′45.74″E
- Country: Slovenia
- Traditional region: Styria
- Statistical region: Savinja
- Municipality: Celje

Area
  - Total: 0.9 km^{2} (0.35 sq mi)
- Elevation: 393.1 m (1,290 ft)

Population (2020)
  - Total: 66
  - Density: 73/km^{2} (190/sq mi)

Jezerce pri Šmartnem (pronounced [jɛˈzeːɾtsɛ pɾi ˈʃmaːɾtnɛm]) is a small settlement in the City Municipality of Celje in eastern Slovenia. It lies on the northern outskirts of Celje. The area is part of the traditional region of Styria. It is now included with the rest of the municipality in the Savinja Statistical Region.

== Name ==
The name of the settlement was changed from Jezerce to Jezerce pri Šmartnem in 1953.
