= Škofja Vas =

- Location in Slovenia
- Coordinates: 46°16′10.07″N 15°17′16.42″E
- Country: Slovenia
- Traditional region: Styria
- Statistical region: Savinja
- Municipality: Celje

Area
  - Total: 1.87 km^{2} (0.72 sq mi)
- Elevation: 257.4 m (844 ft)

Population (2020)
  - Total: 554
  - Density: 296/km^{2} (767/sq mi)

Škofja Vas (pronounced [ˈʃkoːfja ˈʋaːs]; Slovene: Škofja vas) is a settlement in the City Municipality of Celje in eastern Slovenia. It lies on the Hudinja River in the northern outskirts of Celje. The area is part of the traditional region of Styria. It is now included with the rest of the municipality in the Savinja Statistical Region.

== Gallery ==
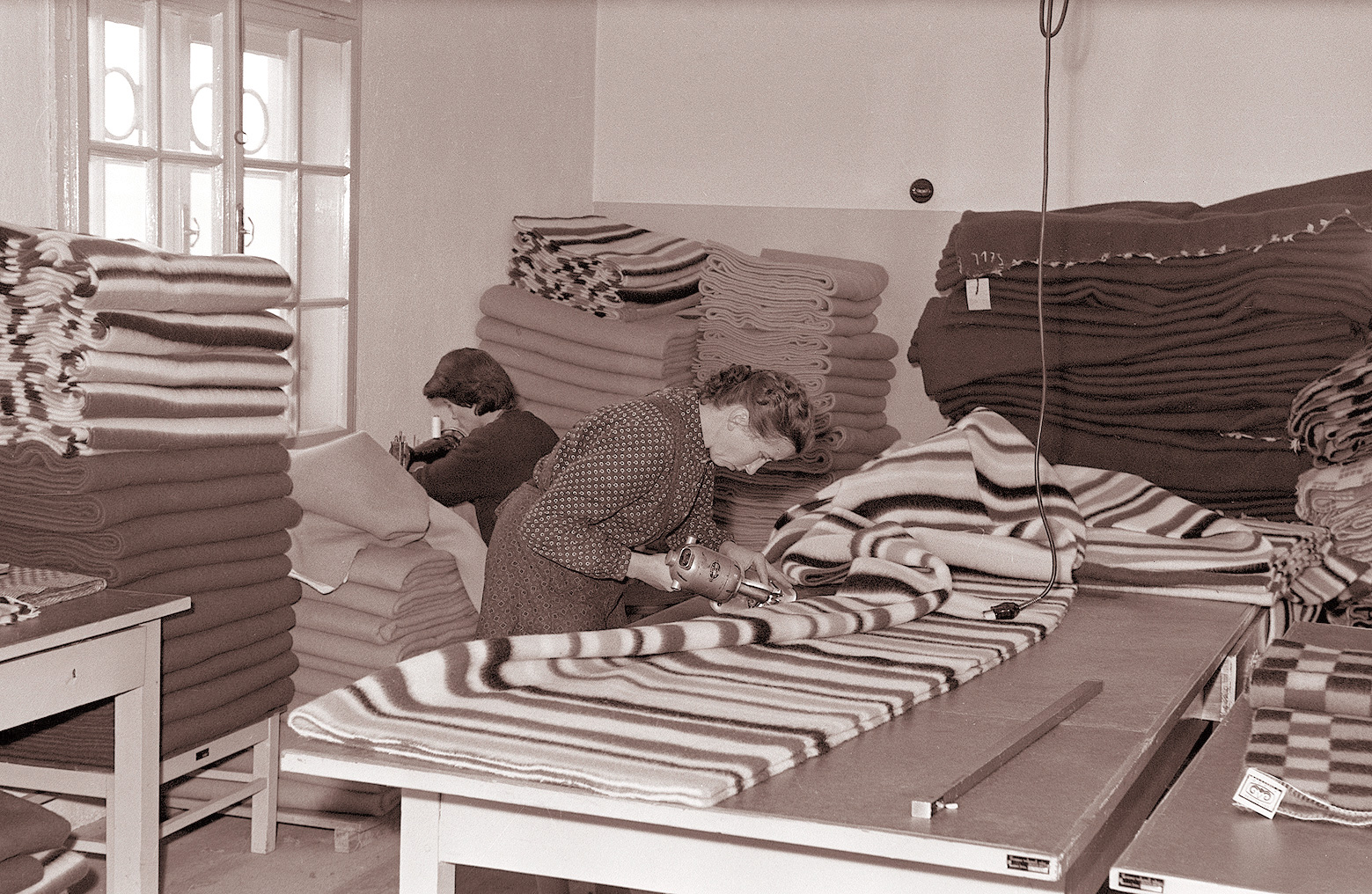
Škofja Vas wool blanket factory, 1960
