= Teharje =

- Location in Slovenia
- Coordinates: 46°13′47.42″N 15°18′8.41″E
- Country: Slovenia
- Traditional region: Styria
- Statistical region: Savinja
- Municipality: Celje

Area
  - Total: 1.01 km^{2} (0.39 sq mi)
- Elevation: 254.6 m (835 ft)

Population (2020)
  - Total: 325
  - Density: 322/km^{2} (833/sq mi)

Teharje (pronounced [ˈteːxaɾjɛ]) is a settlement in the City Municipality of Celje in eastern Slovenia. It lies on the right bank of the Voglajna River on the eastern outskirts of Celje. The area is part of the traditional region of Styria. It is now included with the rest of the municipality in the Savinja Statistical Region.

== Name ==
Teharje was first attested in written sources in 1362 as cze Tyechar(e)n (and later as Tyecharen in 1368, Tychoronen in 1405, Dyetharn in 1466, and zu Tieharn in 1480). The name is believed to derive from *Těxar′e (selo) (literally, 'Těxar's village') based on the hypocoristic personal name *Těxar(′)ь, related to toponyms such as Slovene Teharče (German Techanting) in Austrian Carinthia, as well as Czech Těchařovice and Macedonian Tearce.

== Church ==
The local parish church is dedicated to Saint Martin and belongs to the Roman Catholic Diocese of Celje. It was first mentioned in written documents dating to the 13th century, but the current building is a Neo-Romanesque structure from 1905.

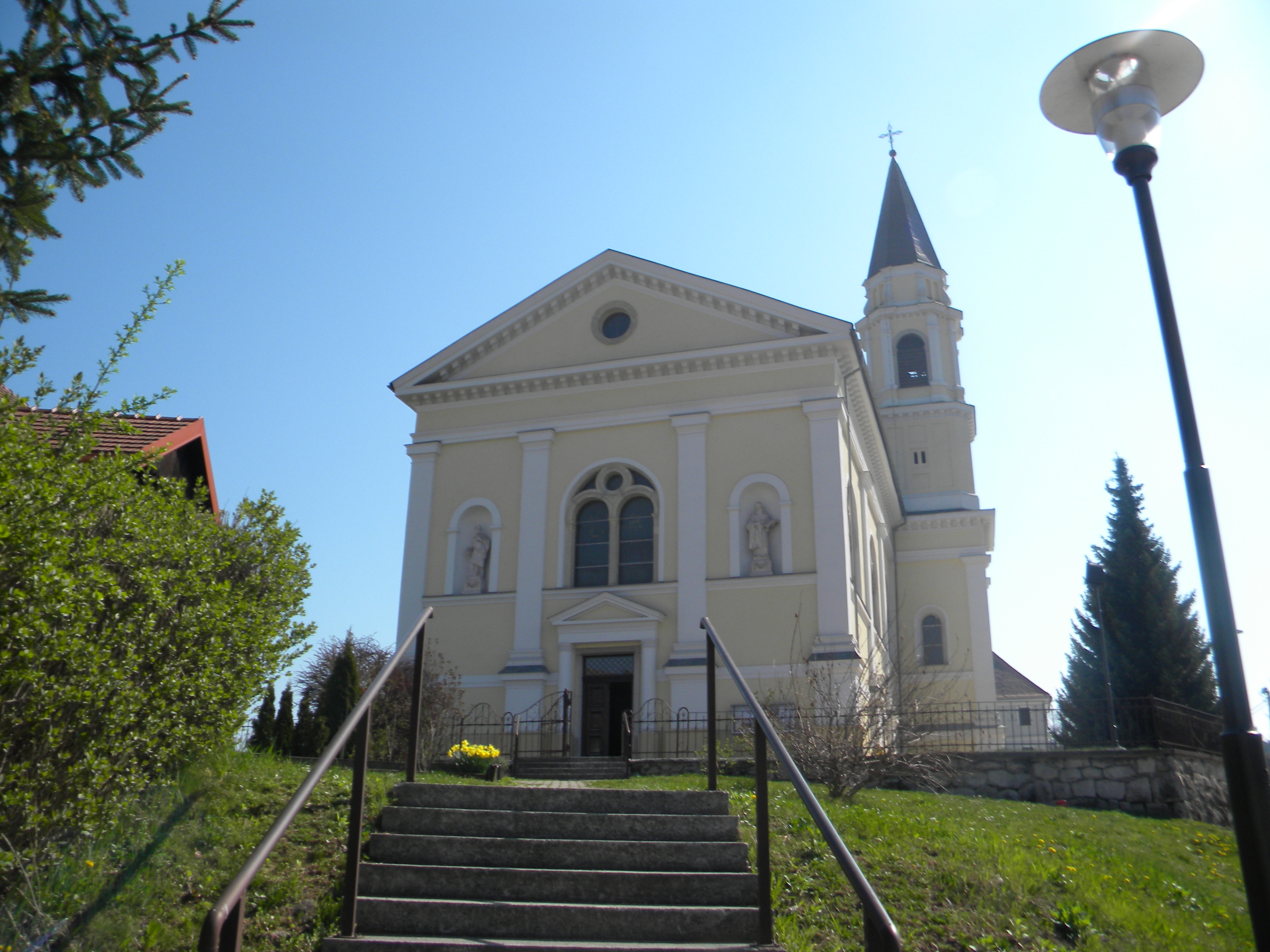
St. Martin's Church

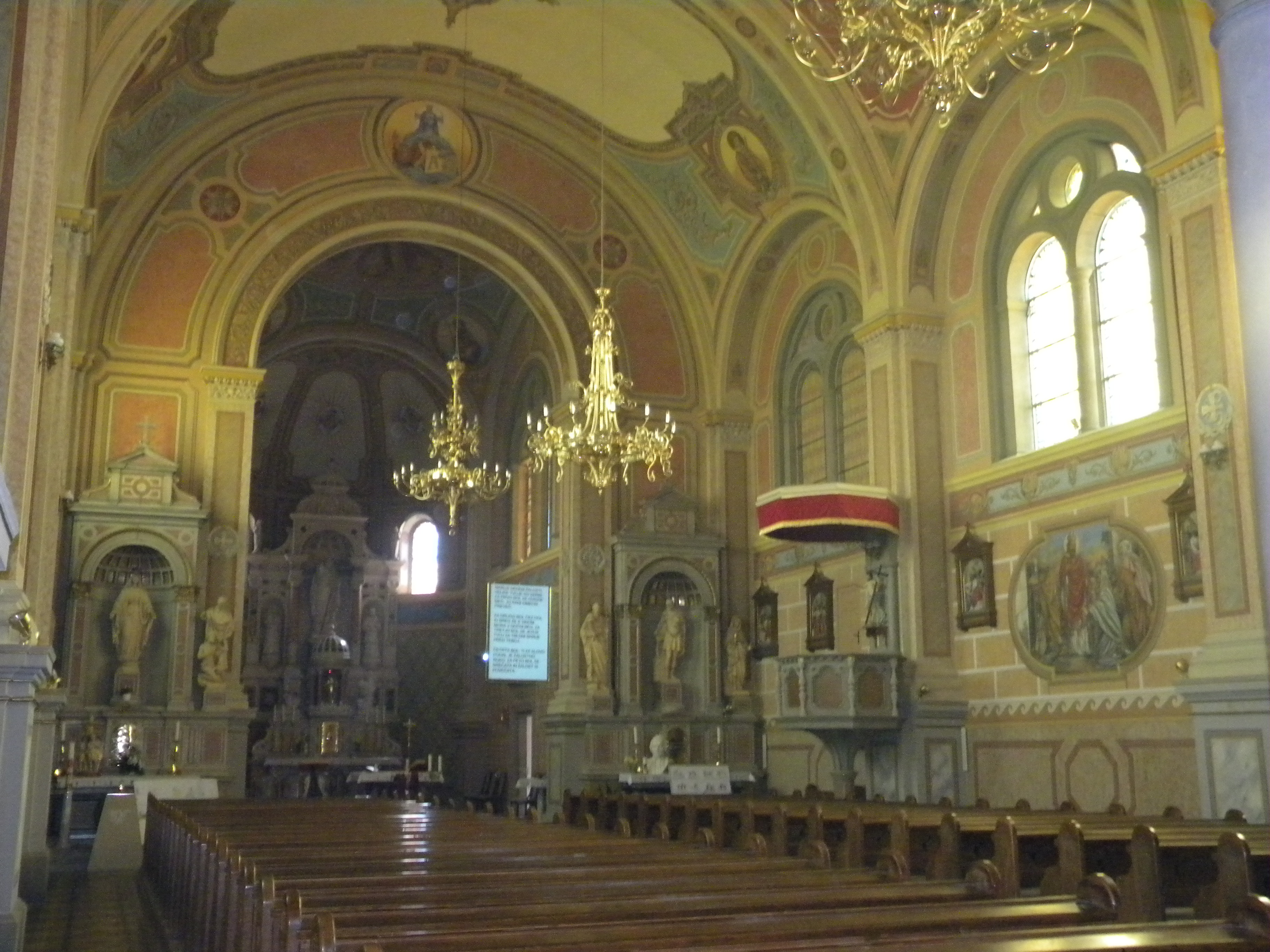
Inside St. Martin's Church

== History ==
During World War II, the Germans built the Teharje camp, which was later used by the Partisans to hold prisoners from the Slovene Home Guard. A memorial park designed by the architect Marko Mušič was built on the site of the camp in 2004.

=== Mass graves ===
Teharje is the site of two known mass graves from the period immediately after the Second World War. They are part of the 25 mass graves in the Celje area. The Janez Mlinar Mass Grave (Slovene: Grobišče Mlinarjev Janez) is located southwest of the settlement, on the edge of a plateau, along a wall to the west, in a trench along the railroad tracks to the south, in a field to the east, behind a dance area, and in other locations. It contains the remains of up to 6,000 Home Guard soldiers, Ustaša officers, German civilians, and Slovenes that were murdered from May to December 1945. The adjacent building at Teharje 9 served as a prison and collection center. The name of the mass grave refers to the Majdič Manor (Majdičeva graščina), also known as the Janez Mlinar Manor (Dvorec Mlinarjev Janez), which was used as a headquarters by the prison camp officials. The Cemetery Mass Grave (Grobišče pri pokopališču) is located 330 meters (1,080 ft) west of Saint Anne's Church. The cemetery is adjacent to the road and is bordered to the east, north, and west by woods. The parking area west of the cemetery was the end of a deep trench that contains the remains of an estimated 130 victims, including German soldiers, German prisoners of war, and Croatian refugees.

== Notable people ==
Notable people that were born or lived in Teharje include:

- Martin Jelovšek (1837–1905), schoolmaster, father of Vladimir Jelovšek (the first husband of the writer Zofka Kveder), who wrote under the pseudonym Teharski 'the one from Teharje')
- Ivan Markošek (1873–1916), religious writer
- Josip Pečnak (1816–1905), journalist
- Mihael Stojan (1804–1863), religious writer and journalist
- Mihael Vizjak (1814–1892), arboriculture and orchard specialist
- Anka Vrečer (1878–1970), singer and theater actress
- Aleksandr Shakhov (1889–1963)
