= Ljubečna =

- Location in Slovenia
- Coordinates: 46°15′18.23″N 15°19′23.15″E
- Country: Slovenia
- Traditional region: Styria
- Statistical region: Savinja
- Municipality: Celje

Area
  - Total: 2.29 km^{2} (0.88 sq mi)
- Elevation: 260.2 m (854 ft)

Population (2020)
  - Total: 1,141
  - Density: 498/km^{2} (1,290/sq mi)

Ljubečna (pronounced [ljuˈbeːtʃna]) is a settlement in the City Municipality of Celje in eastern Slovenia. It is an urbanized settlement on the northeastern outskirts of Celje. The area is part of the traditional region of Styria. It is now included with the rest of the municipality in the Savinja Statistical Region.

Every year there is an event called the Golden Accordion (Slovene: Zlata harmonika). There is also a church dedicated to St. Joseph the Worker, built in the early 1970s. The Ljubečna soil is clayey, and Ljubečna is known for brickmaking.

== Twin towns and sister cities ==
Ljubečna is twinned with:

- Thörl, Austria
