= Nova Vas (district) =

District of Celje, Slovenia

Coordinates: 46°14′46″N 15°15′49″E

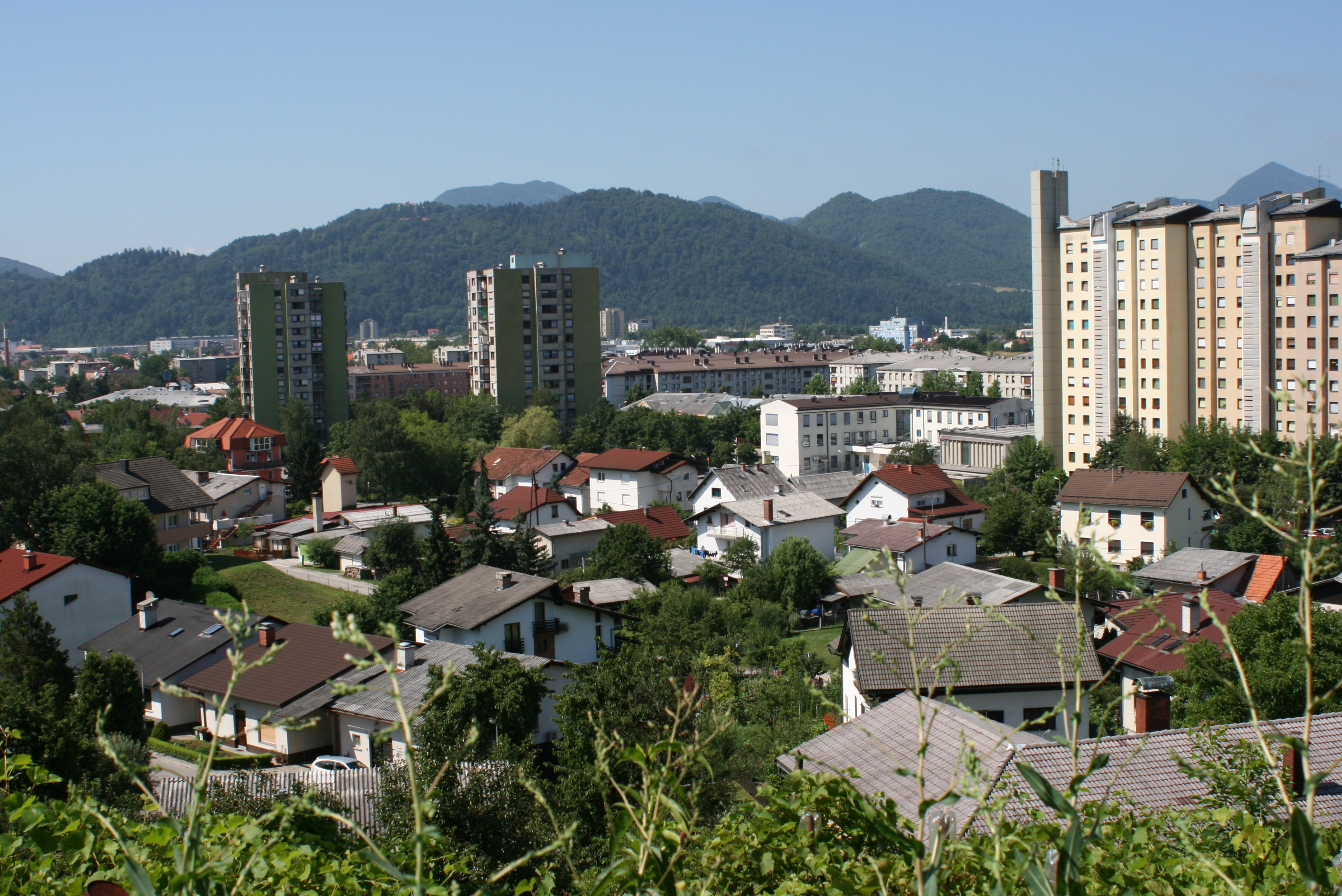
Nova Vas

Nova Vas (pronounced [ˈnɔːʋa ˈʋaːs]; Slovene: Nova vas) is a district (Slovene mestna četrt) of the City Municipality of Celje and a neighborhood of the city of Celje in Slovenia.

Nova Vas translates into "New Village" in English. It is one of ten districts (mestne četrti) of the City Municipality of Celje.

Nova Vas is in the western part of Celje. It is bordered by Ostrožno to the north, Hudinja and Gaberje to the east, Dolgo Polje to the south, and Dečkovo Naselje and Lava to the west.

Nova Vas is primarily a residential neighborhood but it does include some city infrastructure; it is home to Energetika Celje, a public utility company founded by the City Municipality in 1995. This company manages the distribution of natural gas through pipelines and provides district heating to parts of Celje.
