= Vodni stolp =

Vodni stolp (Slovene for "water tower") may refer to:

- Celje Water Tower
- Maribor Water Tower
