= Celje =

- Town
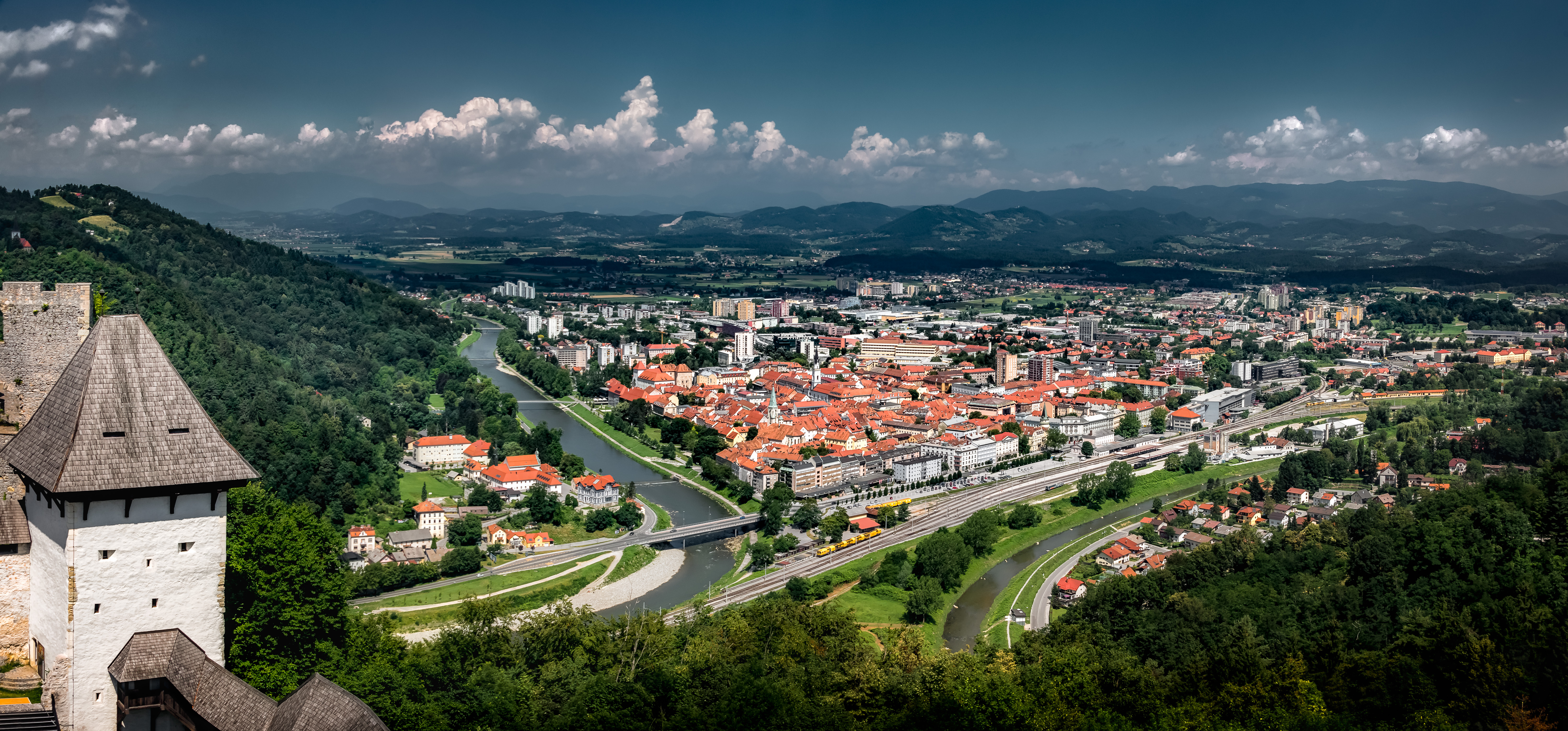
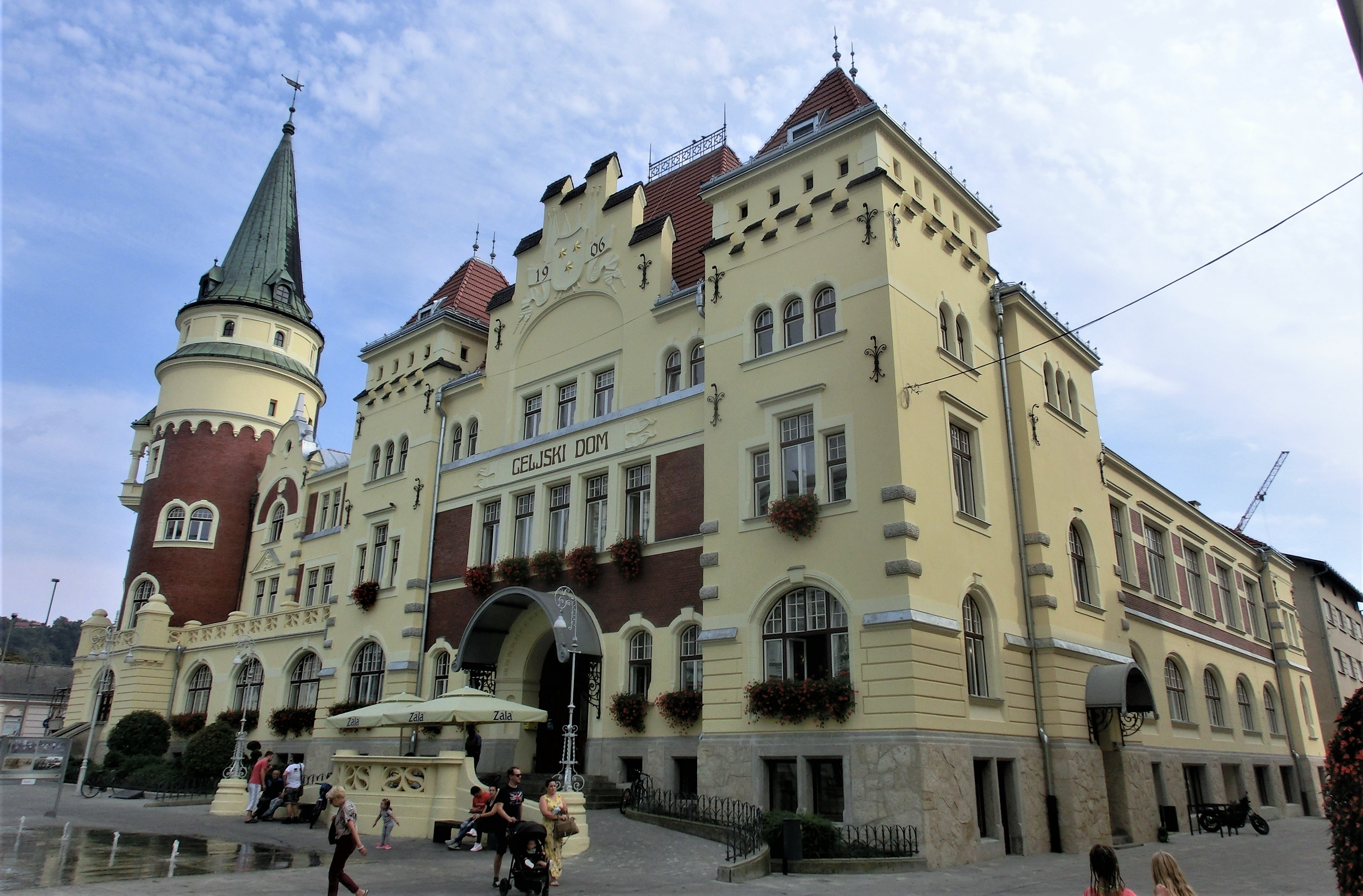
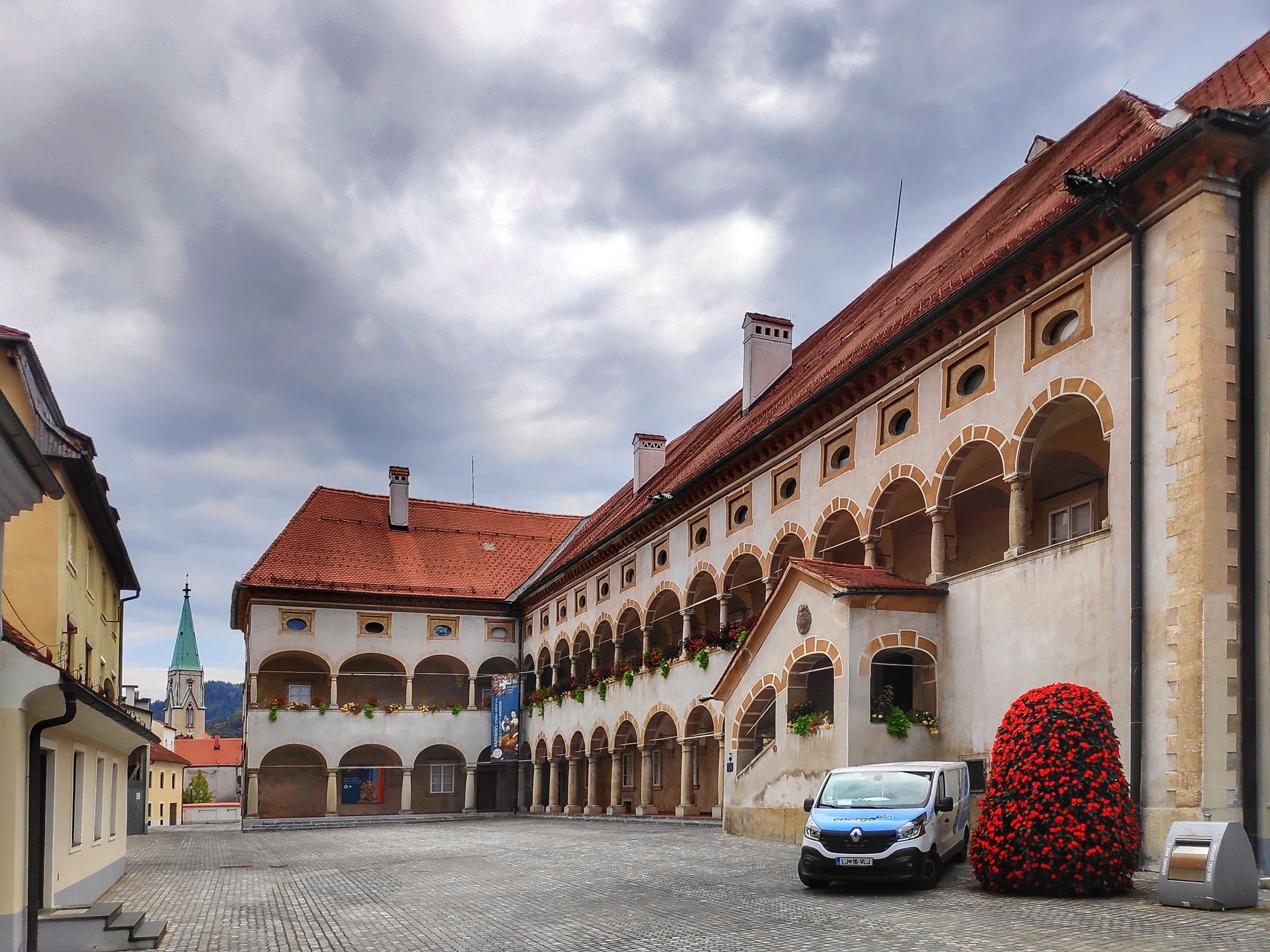
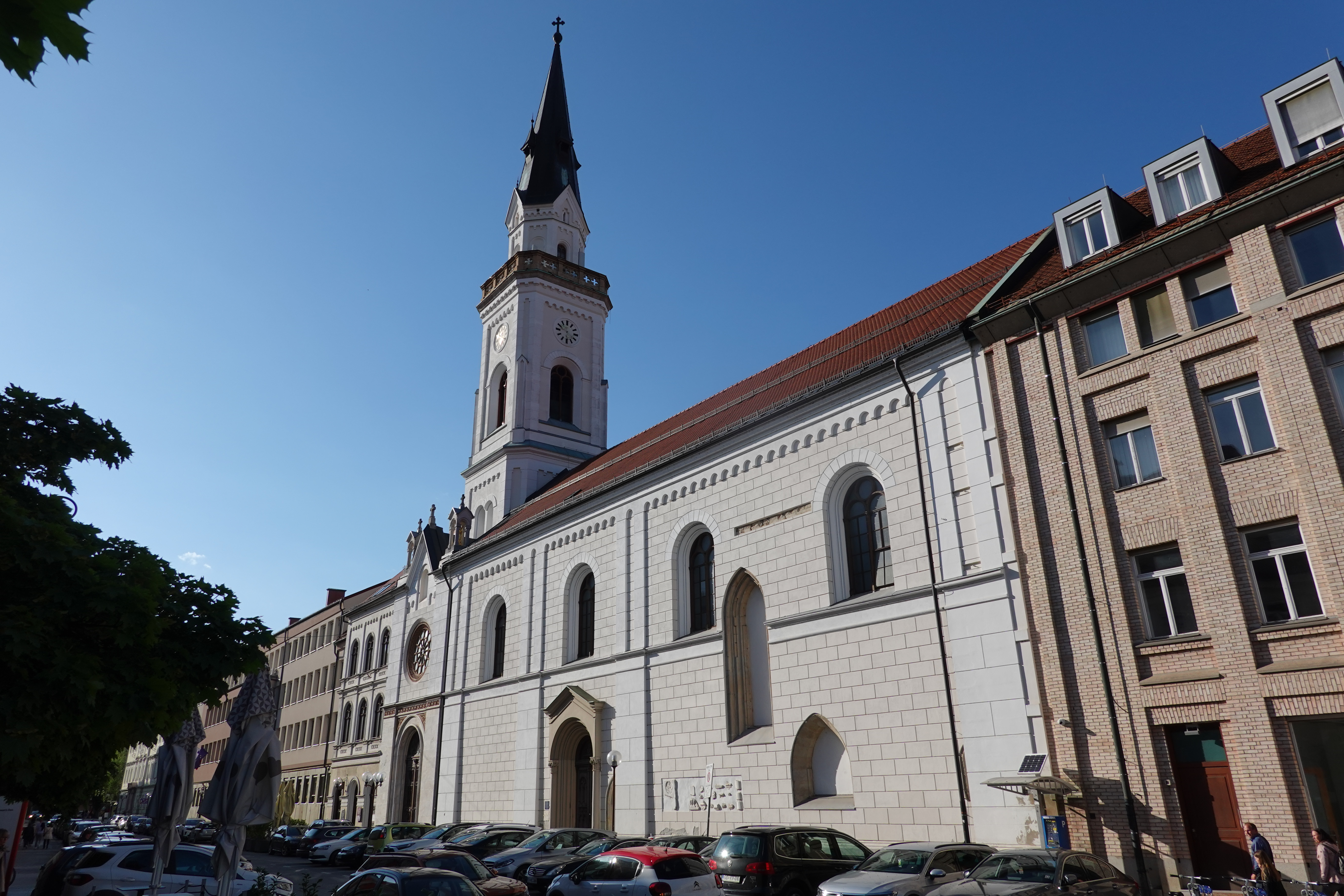
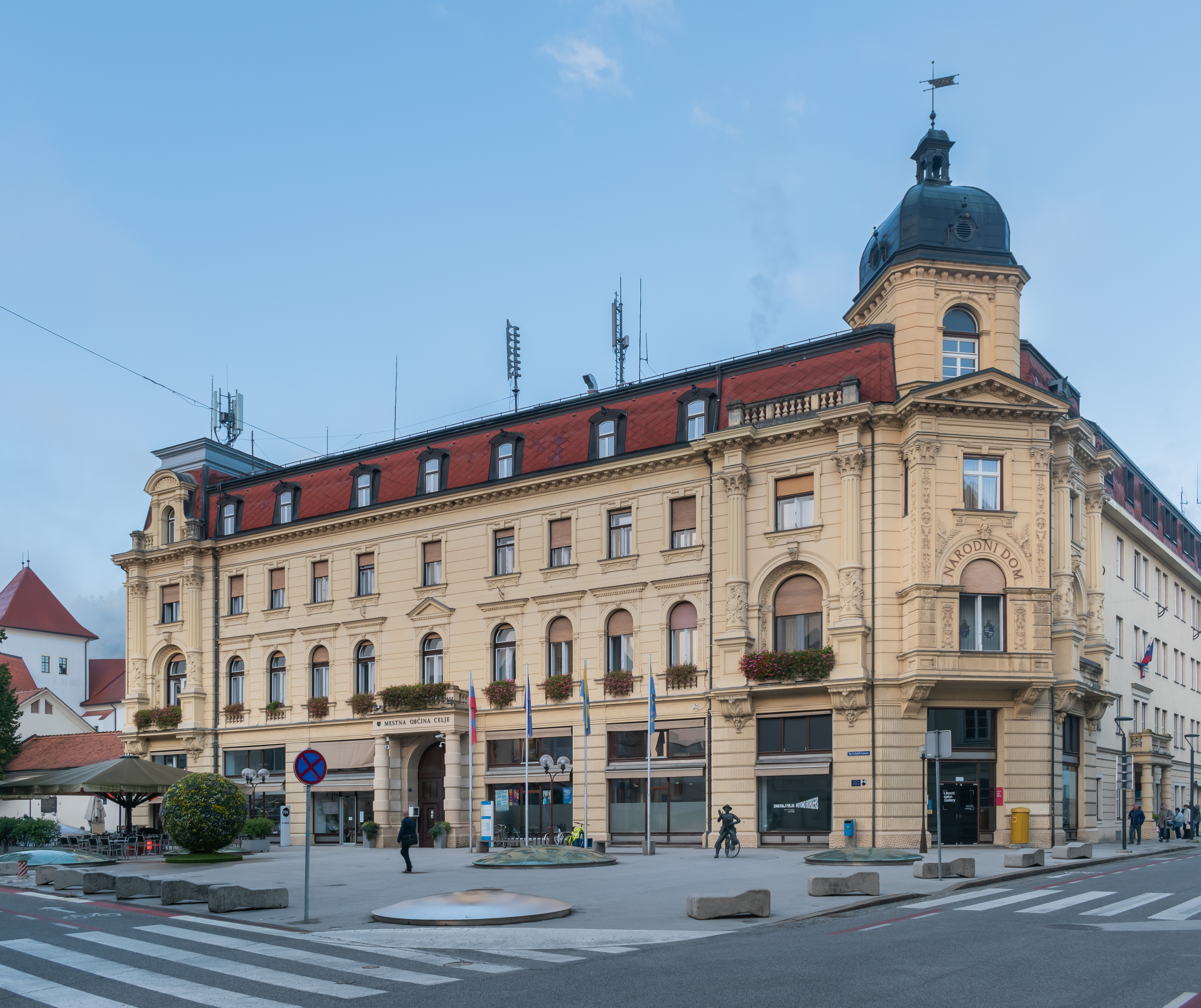
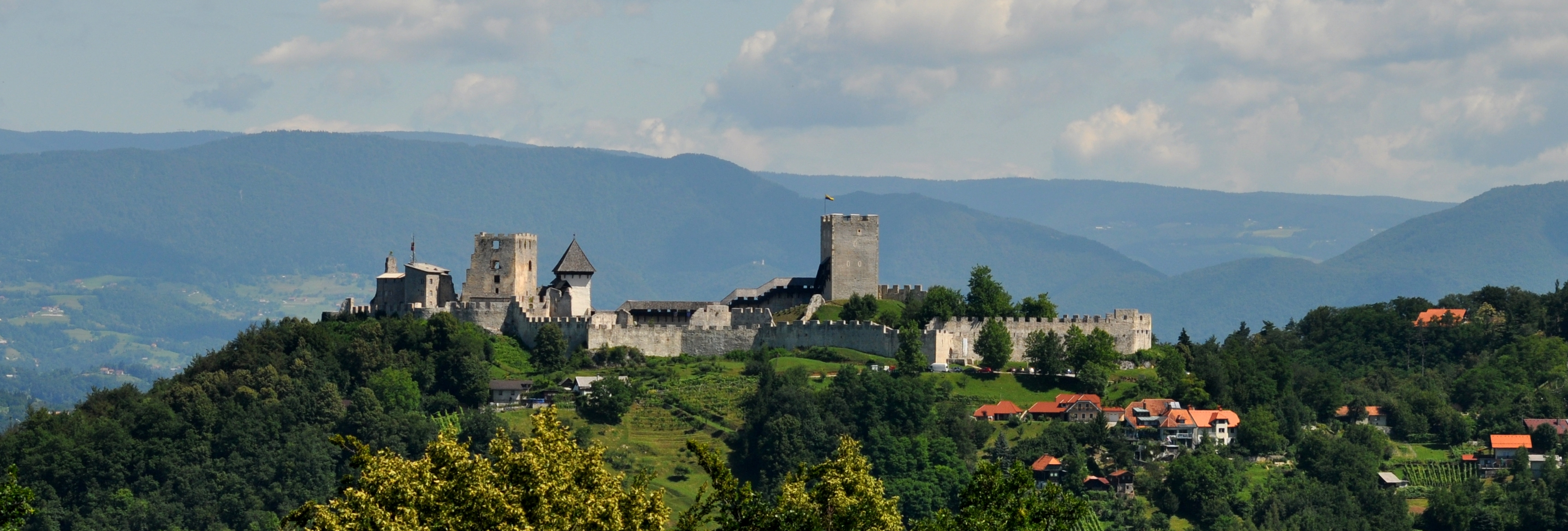
- View from the castle Celje Hall Old Count Manor St. Mary's Church National Hall Celje Castle

- Flag Coat of arms
- Nickname: The Princely Town (Slovene: Knežje mesto)
- Location of the city of Celje in Slovenia
- Coordinates: 46°14′09″N 15°16′03″E
- Country: Slovenia
- Traditional region: Styria
- Statistical region: Savinja
- Municipality: Celje
- Town rights: 11 April 1451
- Districts & local communities: List: Districts; Center; Dečkovo naselje; Dolgo polje; Gaberje; Hudinja; Karel Destovnik Kajuh; Lava; Nova vas; Savinja; Slavko Šlander; Local communities; Aljažev hrib; Ljubečna; Medlog; Ostrožno; Pod gradom; Škofja vas; Šmartno v Rožni dolini; Teharje; Trnovlje

Government
  - Mayor: Matija Kovač (Levica)

Area
  - Total: 22.7 km^{2} (8.8 sq mi)
- Elevation: 238 m (781 ft)

Population (2025)
  - Total: 38,059
  - Density: 1,680/km^{2} (4,340/sq mi)
  - Municipality: 49,628
- Time zone: UTC+1 (CET)
  - Summer (DST): UTC+2 (CEST)
- Postal code: 3000
- Area code: 03
- Vehicle registration: CE
- Climate: Cfb
- Website: www.celje.si
- Source: Statistical Office of the Republic of Slovenia, census of 2002.

Celje (/ˈ(t)sɛljeɪ/ (T)SEL-yay; Slovene: [ˈtsɛ̀ːljɛ]; German: Cilli [ˈtsɪli]) is the third-largest city in Slovenia. It is a regional center of the traditional Slovenian region of Styria and the administrative seat of the Urban Municipality of Celje. The town is located below Upper Celje Castle at the confluence of the Savinja, Hudinja, Ložnica, and Voglajna rivers in the lower Savinja Valley, and at the crossing of the roads connecting Ljubljana, Maribor, Velenje, and the Central Sava Valley.

== Name ==
Celje was known as Celeia during the Roman period. Early attestations of the name during or following Slavic settlement include Cylia in 452, ecclesiae Celejanae in 579, Zellia in 824, in Cilia in 1310, Cilli in 1311, and Celee in 1575. The proto-Slovene name *Ceľe or *Celьje, from which modern Slovene Celje developed, was borrowed from Vulgar Latin Celeae. The name is of pre-Roman origin and its further etymology is unclear. In the local Slovene dialect, Celje is called Cjele or Cele. In German it is called Cilli, and it is known in Italian as Cilli or Celie.

== History ==
=== Bronze Age and Antiquity ===
The first settlement in the area of Celje appeared during the Hallstatt era. The settlement was known in Celtic times and to Ancient Greek historians as Kelea; findings suggest that Celts coined Noric money in the region.

Once the area was incorporated in the Roman Empire in 15 BC, it was known as Civitas Celeia. It received municipal rights in AD 45 under the name municipium Claudia Celeia during the reign of the Roman Emperor Claudius (41–54). Records suggest that the town was rich and densely populated, secured with the walls and towers, containing multi-storied marble palaces, wide squares, and streets. It was called Troia secunda, the second; or small Troy. A Roman road through Celeia led from Aquileia (Sln. Oglej) to Pannonia. Celeia became a flourishing Roman colony, and many great buildings were constructed, including the temple of Mars, which was known across the Roman Empire. Celeia was incorporated into Aquileia c. 320 under the Roman Emperor Constantine I (272–337).

=== Medieval and early modern period ===
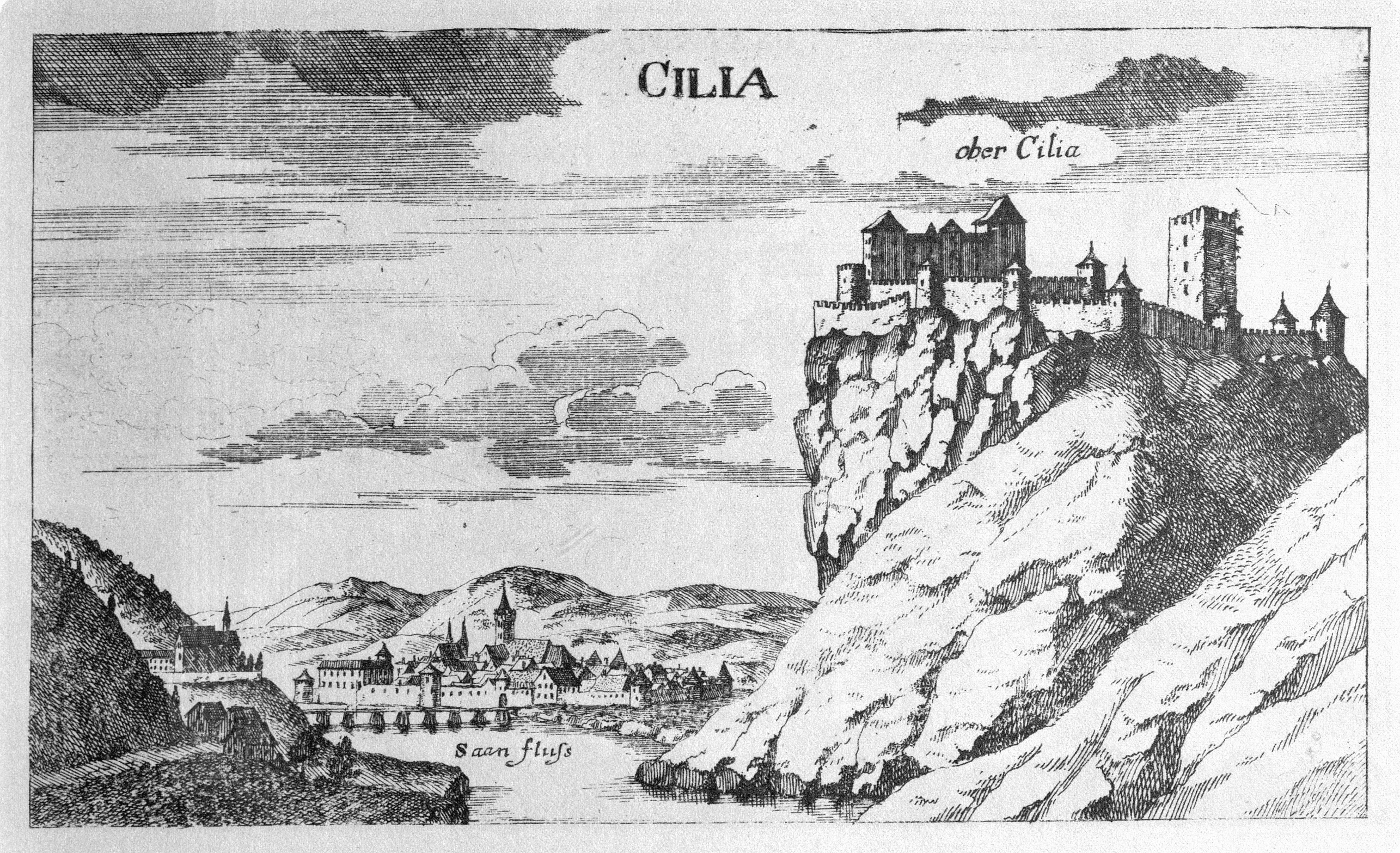
Celje, Georg Matthäus Vischer, Topographia Ducatus Stiriae, Graz 1681

The city was razed by Slavic tribes during the Migration period of the 5th and 6th centuries, but was rebuilt in the Early Middle Ages. The first mention of Celje in the Middle Ages was under the name of Cylie in Wolfhold von Admont's Chronicle, which was written between 1122 and 1137. The town was the seat of the Counts of Celje from 1341 to 1456, with princely status from 1436. It acquired market-town status in the first half of the 14th century and town privileges from Count Frederick II on 11 April 1451. After the Counts of Celje died out in 1456, the region was inherited by the Habsburgs of Austria and administered by the Duchy of Styria. The city walls and defensive moat were built in 1473. The town defended itself against the Turks and during the Slovene peasant revolt of 1515 against peasants, who had taken Old Castle.

Many local nobles converted to Protestantism during the Protestant Reformation, but the region converted back to Roman Catholicism during the Counter-Reformation.

=== Late modern period ===
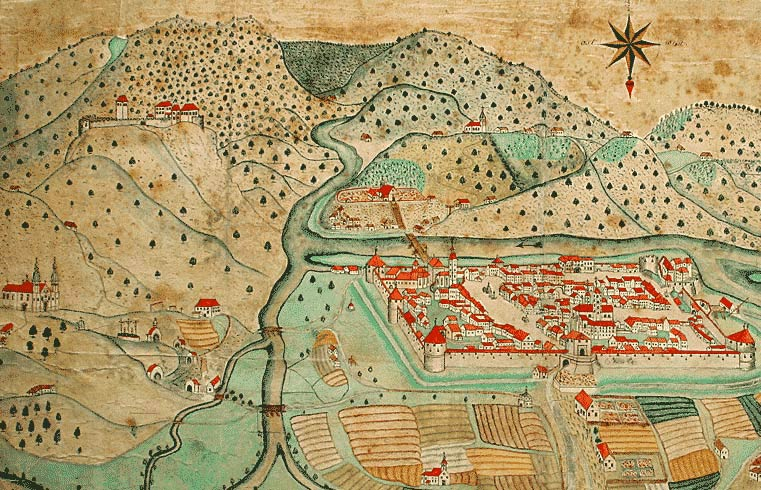
Celje, pictured in 1750. The Voglajna River can be seen on the left, flowing into the Savinja. The island district is called Otok (Slovene for 'island').

Celje became part of the Habsburgs' Austrian Empire during the Napoleonic Wars. In 1867, after the defeat of Austria in the Austro-Prussian War and the ensuing Austro-Hungarian Compromise, the town became part of the Austrian-ruled section of Austria-Hungary.

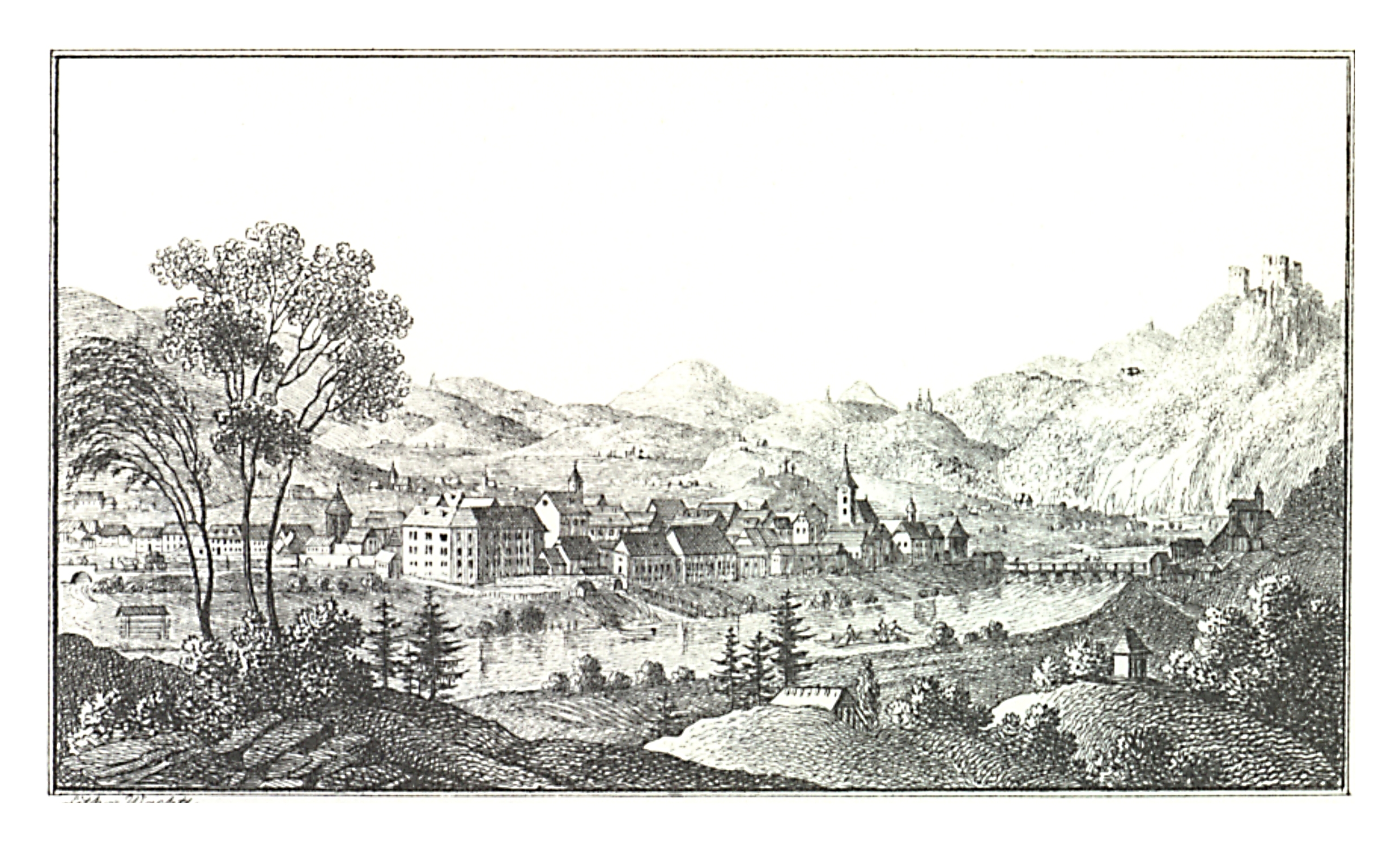
Celje, 1830 - Lith. Kaiser, Graz

The first service on the Vienna-Trieste railway line came through Celje on 27 April 1846. In 1895, Celje secondary school, established in 1808, began to teach in Slovene.

At the end of the 19th century and in the early 20th century, Celje was a center of German nationalism which had repercussions for Slovenes. The 1910 census showed that 66.8% of the population was German. A symbol of this was the German Cultural Center (German: Deutsches Haus), built in 1906 and opened on 15 May 1907, today the Celje Hall (Slovene: Celjski dom). The centuries-old German name of the town, Cilli, sounded no longer German enough to some German residents, the form Celle being preferred by many.

Population growth was steady during this period. In 1900, Celje had 6,743 inhabitants and by 1924 this had grown to 7,750. The National Hall (Narodni dom), which hosts the mayor's office and town council today, was built in 1896. The first telephone line was installed in 1902 and the city received electric power in 1913.

Slovene and German ethnic nationalism increased during the 19th and early 20th centuries. With the collapse of Austria-Hungary in 1918 as a result of World War I, Celje became part of the Kingdom of Serbs, Croats and Slovenes (later known as Yugoslavia). During this period, the town experienced a rapid industrialization and a substantial growth in population.

=== Second World War ===
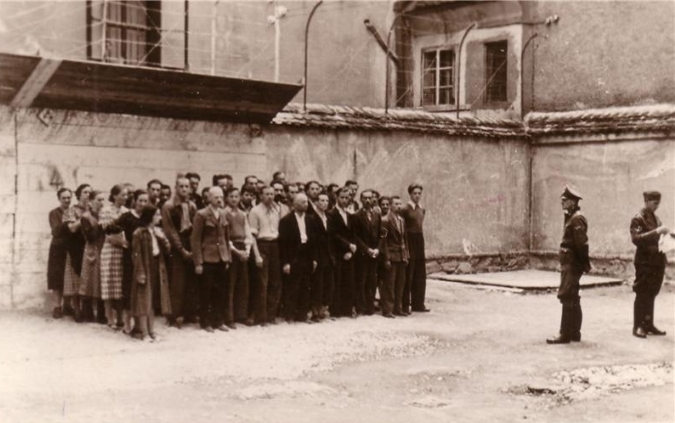
Hostages in the Stari pisker prison in 1942

Celje was occupied by Nazi Germany in April 1941. The Gestapo arrived in Celje on 16 April 1941 and were followed three days later by SS leader Heinrich Himmler, who inspected Stari pisker prison. During the war, the city suffered from allied bombing, aimed at important communication lines and military installations. The National Hall was severely damaged.

The toll of the war on the city was heavy. The city (including nearby towns) had a pre-war population of 20,000 and lost 575 people during the war, mostly between the ages of 20 and 30. More than 1,500 people were deported to Serbia or into the German interior of the Third Reich. Around 300 people were interned and around 1,000 people imprisoned in Celje's prisons. An unknown number of citizens were forcibly conscripted into the German army. Around 600 "stolen children" were taken to Nazi Germany for Germanization. A monument in Celje called Vojna in mir (War and Peace) by the sculptor Jakob Savinšek, commemorates the World War II era.

After the end of the war, the remaining German-speaking portion of the populace was expelled or executed. Anti-tank trenches and other sites were used to create 25 mass graves in Celje and its immediate surroundings and were filled with Croatian, Serbian, and Slovenian militia members that had collaborated with the Germans, as well as ethnic German civilians from Celje and surrounding areas.

=== Independent Slovenia ===
Celje became part of independent Slovenia following the Ten-Day War in 1991. On 7 April 2006, Celje became the seat of a new Diocese of Celje, created by Pope Benedict XVI within the Archdiocese of Maribor.

== Sights ==
The town's tourist sights include a Grayfriars' monastery founded in 1241 and a palace from the 16th century.

The parish church, dating from the 14th century, with its Gothic chapel, is a specimen of medieval architecture. The so-called German church, in Romanesque style, belonged to the monastery, which was closed in 1808. The throne of the counts of Cilli is preserved here, and also the tombs of several members of the family.

== Geography ==
=== Climate ===
Celje has an oceanic climate (Köppen climate classification Cfb).

Climate data for Celje (1991–2020 normals, extremes 1950–present)
Month	Jan	Feb	Mar	Apr	May	Jun	Jul	Aug	Sep	Oct	Nov	Dec	Year
Record high °C (°F)	17.1 (62.8)	21.4 (70.5)	25.5 (77.9)	28.9 (84.0)	32.6 (90.7)	36.9 (98.4)	37.7 (99.9)	39.7 (103.5)	33.3 (91.9)	26.9 (80.4)	22.8 (73.0)	20.0 (68.0)	39.7 (103.5)
Mean daily maximum °C (°F)	4.7 (40.5)	7.3 (45.1)	12.2 (54.0)	17.3 (63.1)	21.8 (71.2)	25.7 (78.3)	27.6 (81.7)	27.4 (81.3)	21.9 (71.4)	16.5 (61.7)	10.1 (50.2)	5.0 (41.0)	16.5 (61.7)
Daily mean °C (°F)	0.1 (32.2)	1.4 (34.5)	5.7 (42.3)	10.3 (50.5)	14.9 (58.8)	18.8 (65.8)	20.3 (68.5)	19.7 (67.5)	14.8 (58.6)	10.4 (50.7)	5.6 (42.1)	0.7 (33.3)	10.2 (50.4)
Mean daily minimum °C (°F)	−4 (25)	−3 (27)	0.1 (32.2)	4.2 (39.6)	8.8 (47.8)	12.8 (55.0)	14.0 (57.2)	13.7 (56.7)	9.8 (49.6)	6.1 (43.0)	2.1 (35.8)	−2.9 (26.8)	5.1 (41.2)
Record low °C (°F)	−29.2 (−20.6)	−28.4 (−19.1)	−24.2 (−11.6)	−9.1 (15.6)	−4.2 (24.4)	−0.7 (30.7)	3.7 (38.7)	2.5 (36.5)	−2.2 (28.0)	−8.6 (16.5)	−19.5 (−3.1)	−23.2 (−9.8)	−29.2 (−20.6)
Average precipitation mm (inches)	46 (1.8)	58 (2.3)	60 (2.4)	74 (2.9)	95 (3.7)	120 (4.7)	126 (5.0)	114 (4.5)	132 (5.2)	115 (4.5)	100 (3.9)	77 (3.0)	1,118 (44.0)
Average extreme snow depth cm (inches)	5 (2.0)	6 (2.4)	2 (0.8)	0 (0)	0 (0)	0 (0)	0 (0)	0 (0)	0 (0)	0 (0)	1 (0.4)	3 (1.2)	1.5 (0.6)
Average precipitation days (≥ 0.1 mm)	10	9	10	13	14	14	13	12	12	12	12	11	141
Average snowy days (≥ 0 cm)	13	12	5	0	0	0	0	0	0	0	3	10	43
Average relative humidity (%) (at 14:00)	67	55	50	48	48	49	48	48	54	60	67	73	56
Mean monthly sunshine hours	81.2	105.4	145.4	178.3	217.4	233.7	258.3	246.8	172.7	131.1	72.5	63.5	1,906.3
Source 1: Slovenian Environment Agency (humidity and snow 1981–2010)
Source 2: NOAA (sun 1991–2020), Ogimet

== Symbols ==
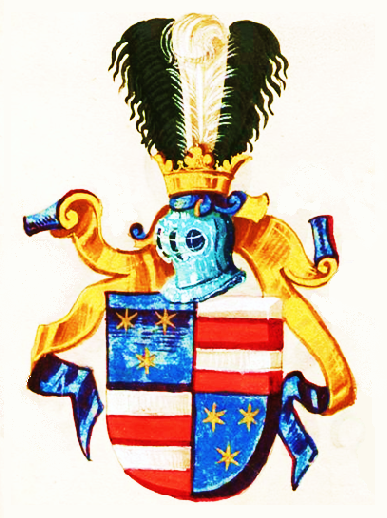
Escutcheon of Ulrich II of Celje

The coat of arms of Celje are based on the coat of arms of the Counts of Celje.

The coat-of-arms of Celje was selected for the national arms immediately after World War I in 1918, when Slovenia together with Croatia and Serbia formed the original Kingdom of Serbs, Croats and Slovenes (later Yugoslavia). A similar coat of arms was integrated into the Slovenian national arms in 1991.

== Districts and local communities ==
The city of Celje is divided into 10 districts (mestne četrti) and the municipality has 9 local communities (krajevne skupnosti):

Districts

- Center
- Dečkovo Naselje
- Dolgo Polje
- Gaberje
- Hudinja
- Karel Destovnik Kajuh
- Lava
- Nova Vas
- Savinja
- Slavko Šlander

Local communities

- Aljažev Hrib
- Ljubečna
- Medlog
- Ostrožno
- Pod Gradom
- Škofja Vas
- Šmartno v Rožni Dolini
- Teharje
- Trnovlje

== Demographics ==
Historical population
Year	Pop.	±% p.a.
1439	1,000	—
1798	1,400	+0.09%
1820	1,635	+0.71%
1834	1,511	−0.56%
1840	1,793	+2.89%
1900	6,743	+2.23%
1924	7,750	+0.58%
1940	20,000	+6.10%
1981	33,033	+1.23%
1991	41,279	+2.25%
2002	37,834	−0.79%
2011	37,520	−0.09%
2021	37,392	−0.03%

In 1991 the population consisted of:

- Slovenes: 33,434 (82.1%)
- Serbs: 1,864 (4.6%)
- Croats: 1,687 (4.1%)
- ethnic Muslims: 466 (1.1%)
- Yugoslavs: 405 (1%)
- Albanians: 189
- Macedonians: 140
- Montenegrins: 93
- Hungarians: 41
- Others: 82
- Unknown: 1,972 (4.8%)
- Undeclared: 249
- Regionally declared: 88

== Education ==
Celje does not have its own university, although some college-level education has been established in the city.

- The Faculty of Logistics, formally part of the University of Maribor, was established in Celje in 2005.
- International School for Social and Business Studies
- Faculty of Commercial and Business Sciences
- UP Faculty of Management

== Law and government ==
=== Mayor ===
The current mayor of Celje is Matija Kovač.

=== Vice mayors ===
The current vice mayors of Celje are Saša Kundih, Samo Seničar and Uroš Lesjak.

=== Courts ===
In Celje there are three courts of general jurisdiction:

- Celje Higher Court;
- Celje District Court;
- Celje Local Court.

In addition to that there are also Celje Labour Court for resolving labour law disputes and an external department of Administrative Court for resolving disputes arising from administrative procedures.

== Communications ==
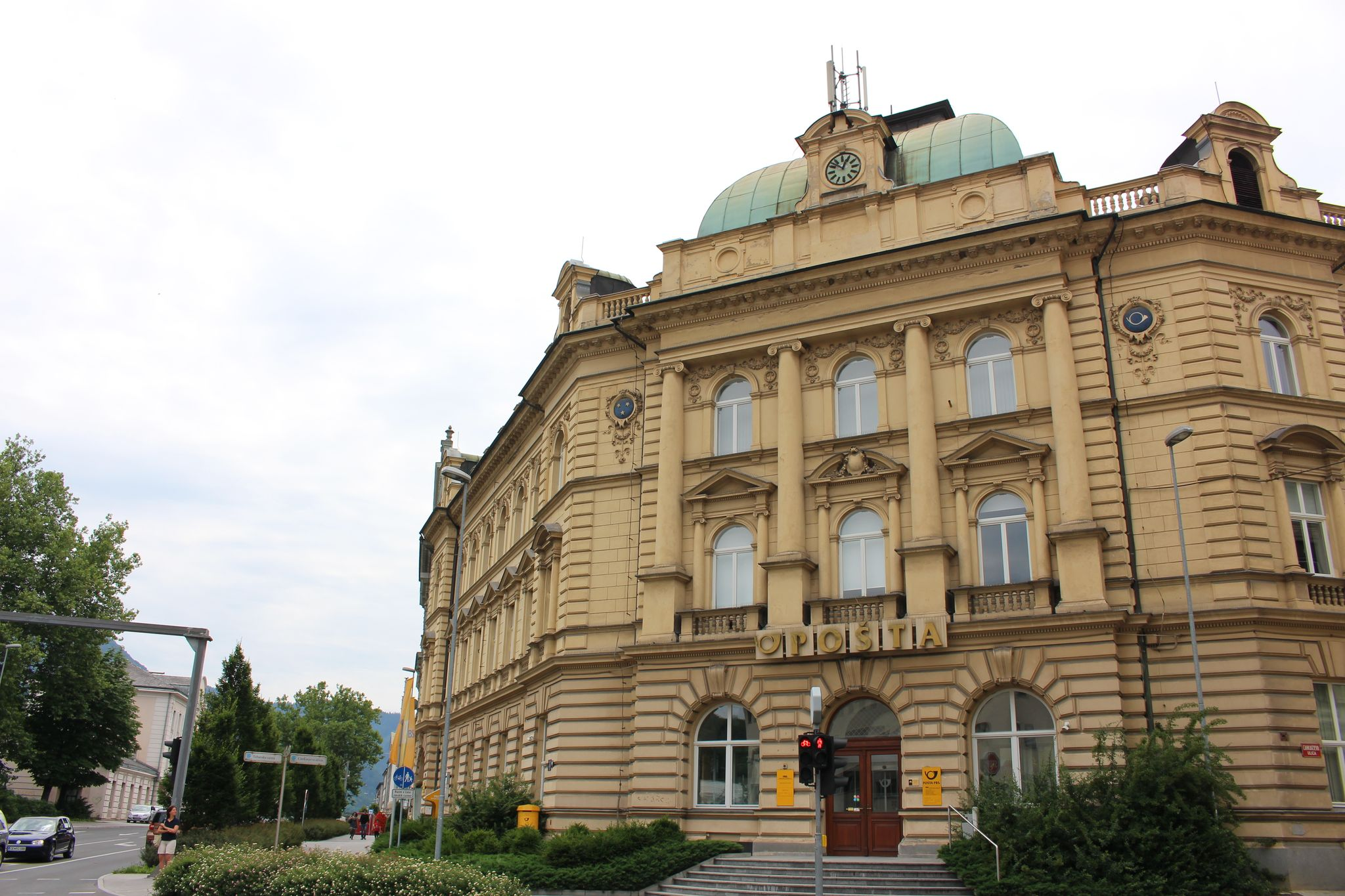
The Celje Post Office

Postal number: SI-3000 (from 1991). (Old one: 63000 (between 1945–1991)).

== Sports ==
Sports clubs based in Celje include football club NK Celje, basketball club KK Celje, handball club RK Celje, ice hockey club HK Celje.

== International relations ==
=== Twin towns and sister cities ===
Celje is twinned with

- Budva, Montenegro (1984)
- Ćuprija, Serbia (1966)
- (Bosnia and Herzegovina) Doboj, Bosnia and Hercegovina (1965)
- Gaziantep, Turkey (2014)
- Grevenbroich, Germany (1986)
- Šabac, Serbia (2012)
- Shchyolkovo, Russia (2017)
- Singen, Germany (1990)
- Sisak, Croatia (1965)
- Slavonski Brod, Croatia (2010)
- Sombor, Serbia (1986)
- Veles, North Macedonia (1979)

Celje also cooperates with Cherepovets in Russia and has informal friendly relations with Graz and Spittal an der Drau in Austria.

== Notable people ==
- Anna of Celje (1381–1416), Queen consort of Poland
- Lenore Aubert (1918–1993), Hollywood actress and model
- Barbara of Celje (1390/1395–1451), second wife of Sigismund, Holy Roman Emperor
- Trude Breitschopf (1915–2001), film actress
- Gregor Cankar (born 1975), athlete
- Jolanda Čeplak (born 1976), athlete
- Anica Černej (1900–1944), poet, author, and schoolmistress
- Janez Drnovšek (1950–2008), politician, statesman, and third president of Slovenia
- Janez Drozg (1933–2005), television director
- Dejan Glavnik (born 1975), Slovenian extreme cyclist
- Damjana Golavšek (born 1964), singer
- Bojan Gorišek (born 1962), pianist
- Hermann II of Celje (1365–1435), Count of Celje, Ortenburg and Seger
- Andrej Hieng (1925–2000), writer, playwright, screenwriter and dramaturgist
- Andrej Inkret (1943–2015), critic, essayist, theatrologist and dramaturgist
- Lea Jagodič (born 1991), basketball player
- Romana Jordan Cizelj (born 1966), physicist and politician
- Boban Jović (born 1991), footballer
- Jelko Kacin (born 1955), politician
- Alma Karlin (1889–1950), traveller, author, poet, and collector
- Margareta of Celje (1411–1480), noblewoman member of the House of Celje, duchess of Głogów and Ścinawa.
- Margit Korondi (born 1932), gymnast, Olympic champion
- Janez K. Lapajne (1937–2012), geophysicist and seismologist
- Janez Lapajne (born 1967), film director
- Marianne Elisabeth Lloyd-Dolbey (1919–1994), personal secretary to the Brunei sultan Omar Ali Saifuddien III
- Julie Martini (1871–1943), photographer
- Janko Orožen (1891–1989), historian, honorary citizen
- Oto Pestner (born 1956), musician and singer
- Milan Pogačnik (born 1946), politician
- Lucija Polavder (born 1984), judoka
- Elza Premšak (1914–1947), worker, victim of the communist regime
- Fran Roš (1898–1976), writer, poet, playwright, honorary citizen
- Johann Gabriel Seidl (1804–1875), archeologist, poet, storyteller and dramatist
- Bina Štampe Žmavc (born 1952), poet and author
- Tina Trstenjak (born 1990), judoka, Olympic champion
- Beno Udrih (born 1982), basketball player
- Bogumil Vošnjak (1882–1955), scholar, politician, diplomat
- Urška Žolnir (born 1981), judoka, Olympic champion

== Gallery ==
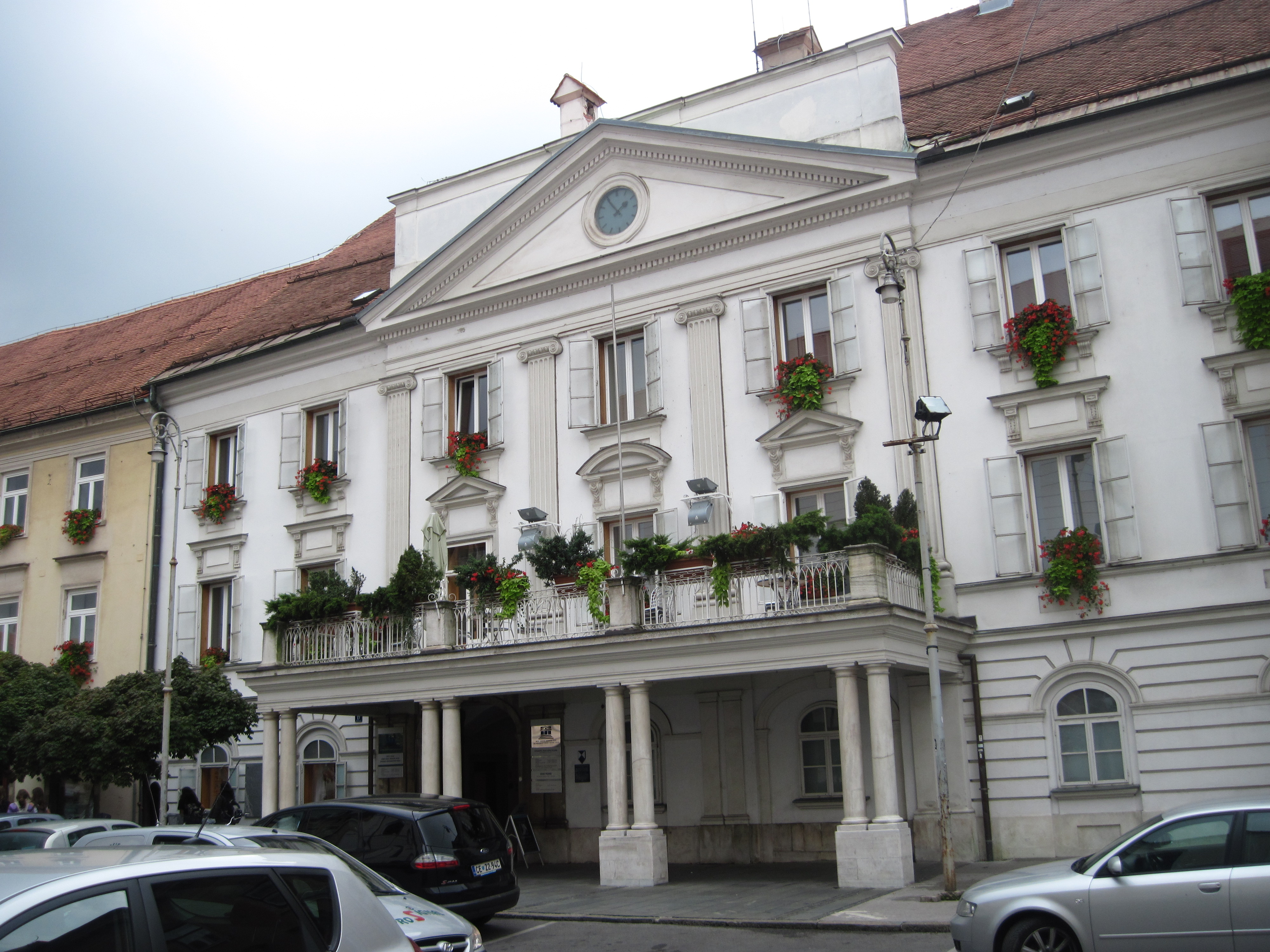
Town Hall

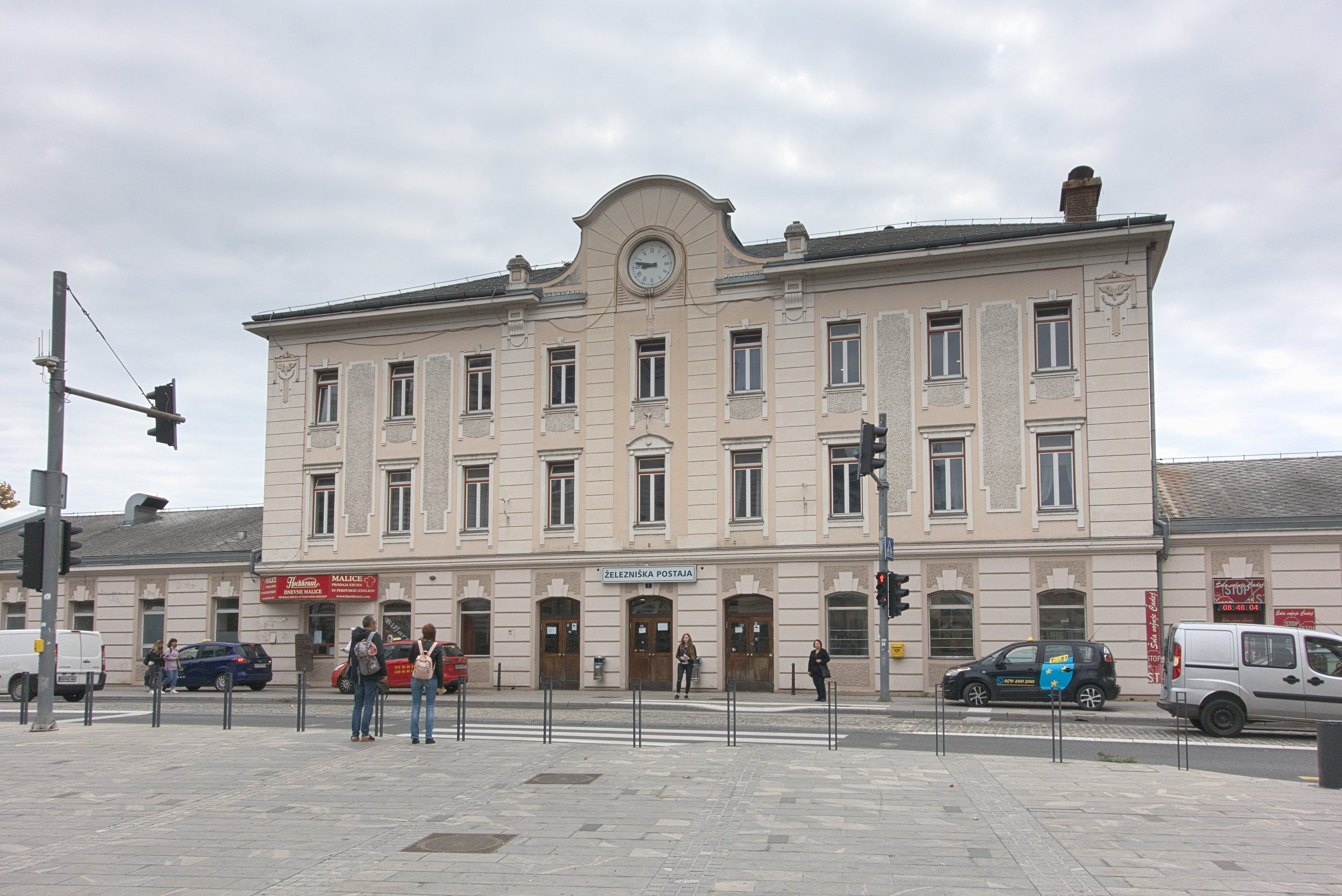
Railway Station

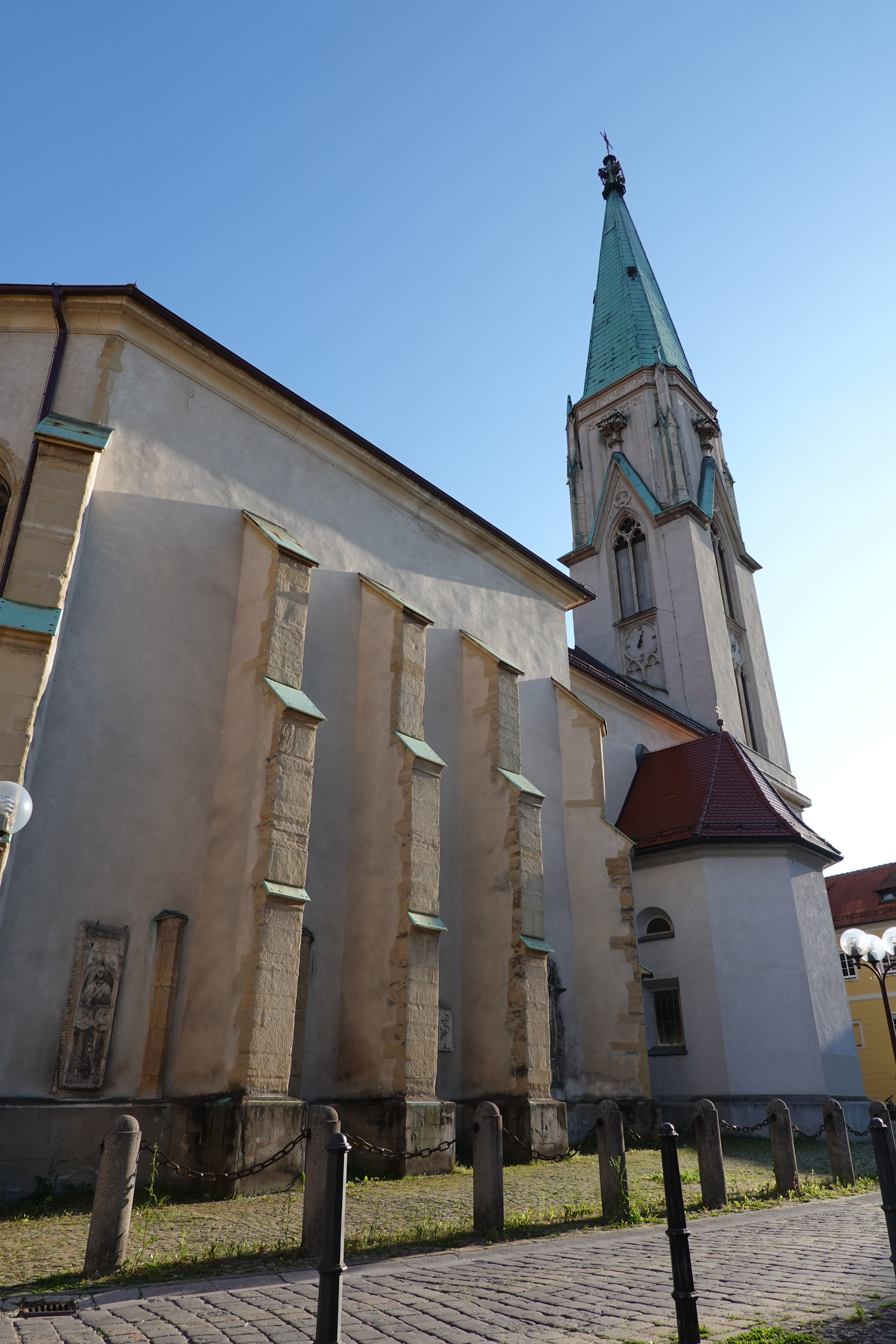
Celje Cathedral

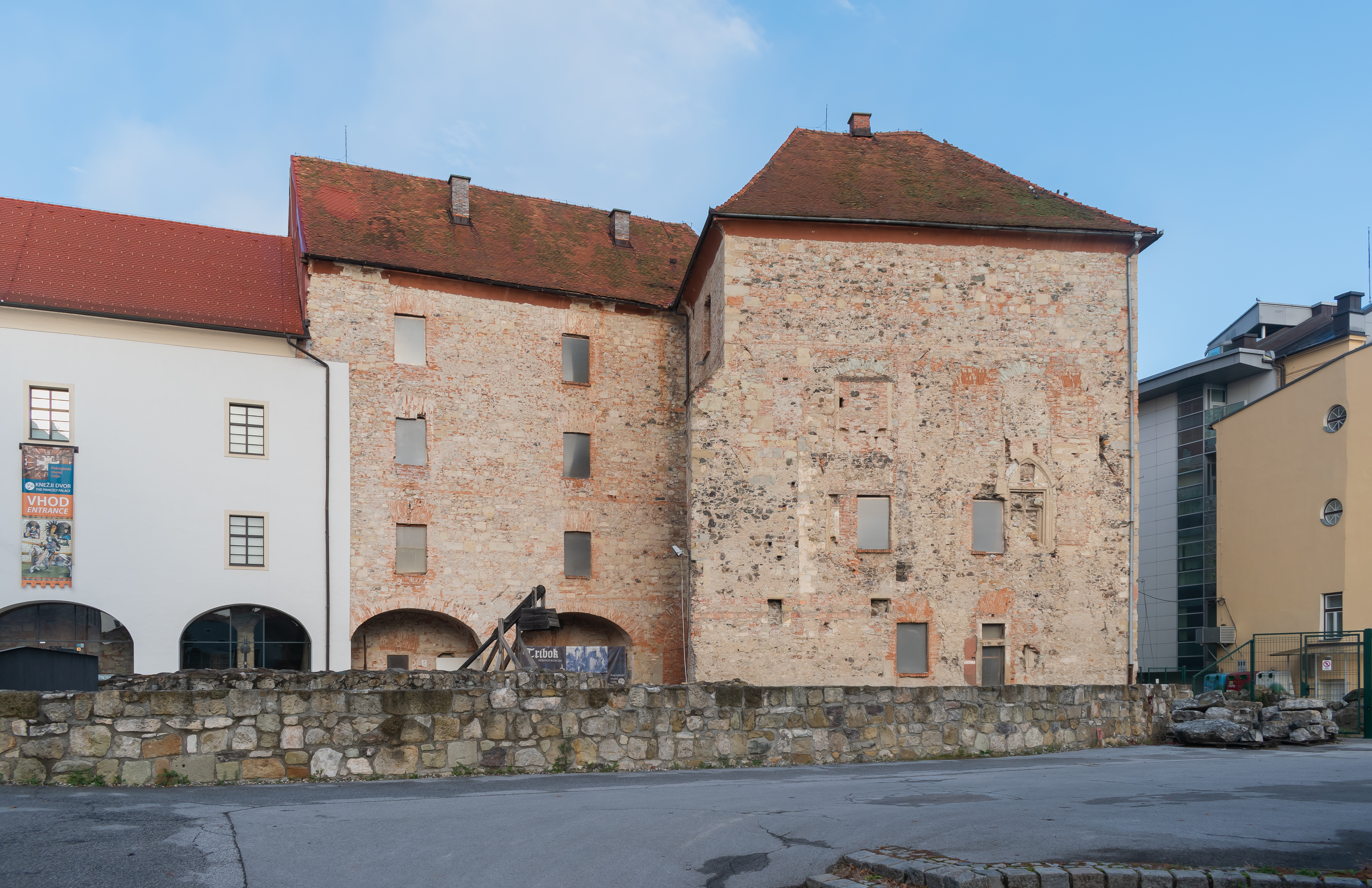
Ducal Court

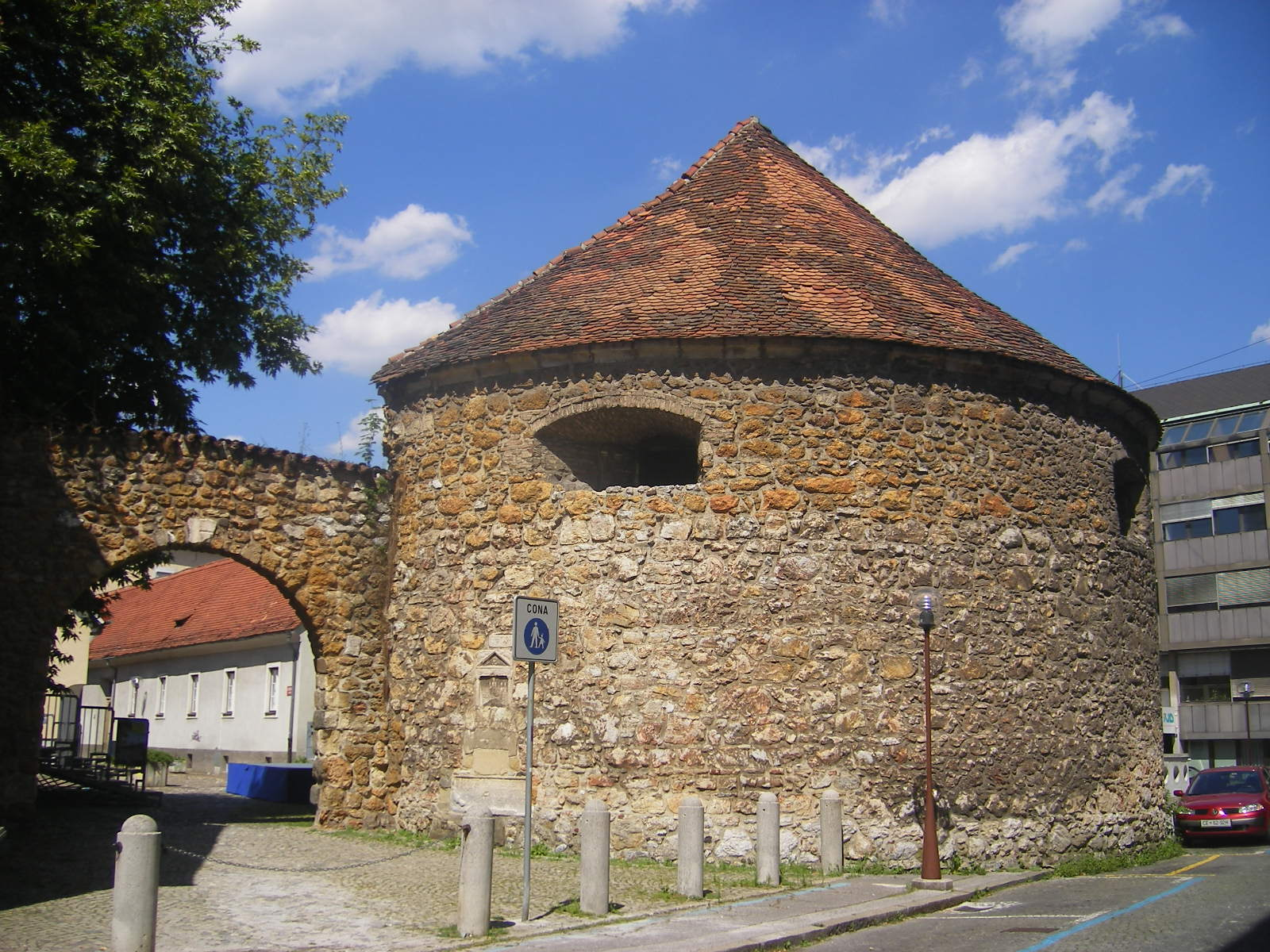
Water Tower

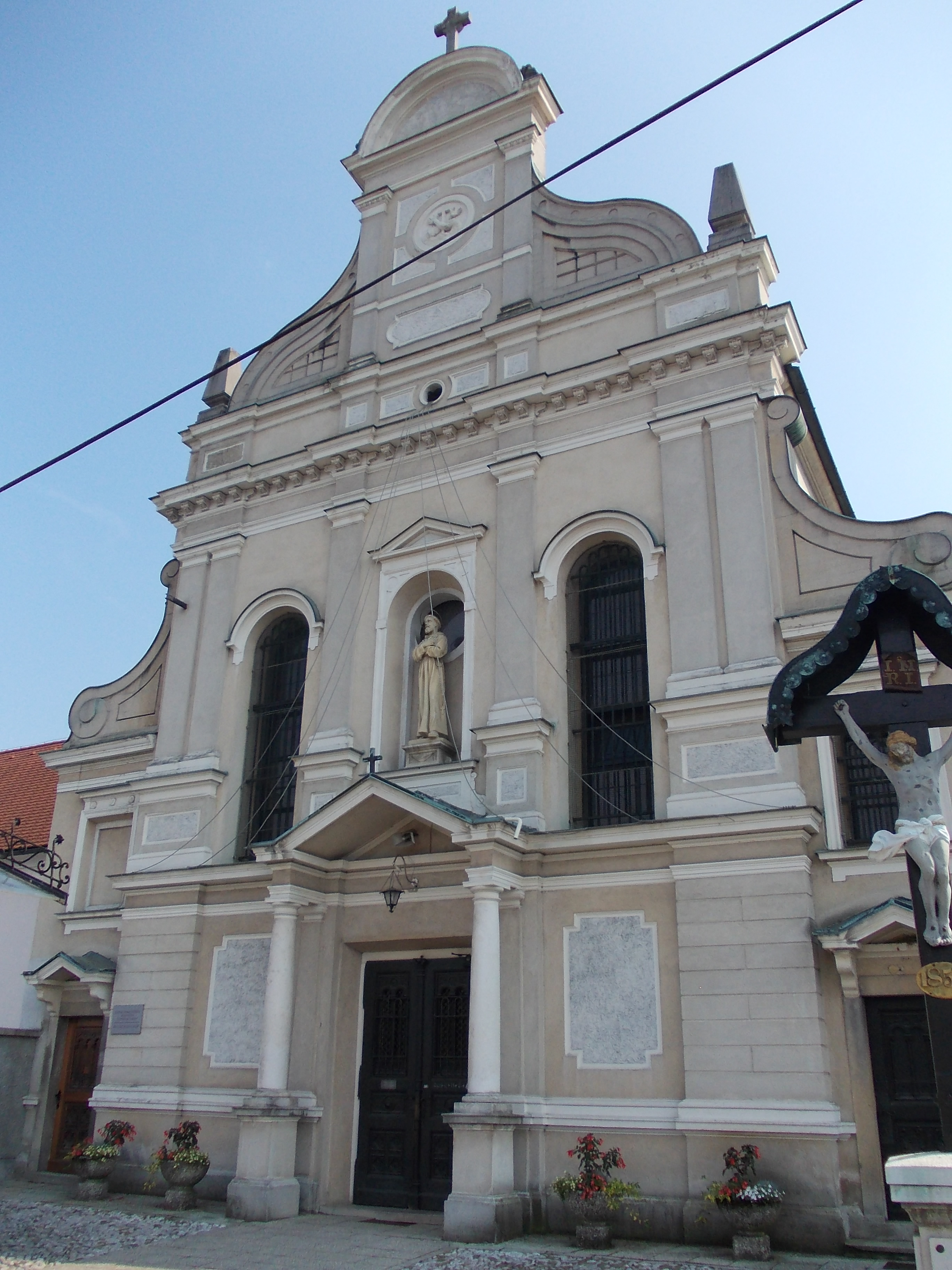
St. Cecilia's Church

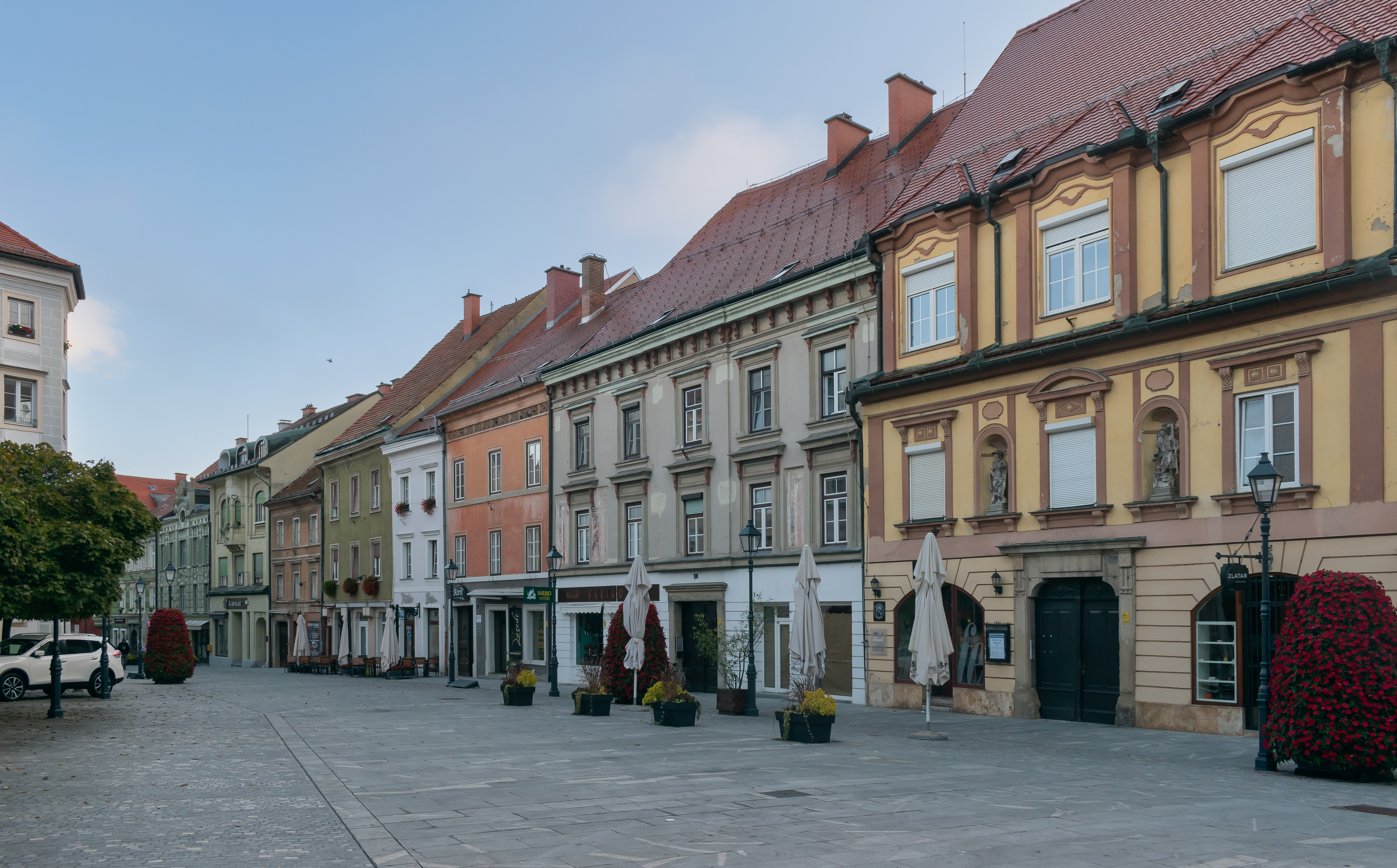
Main Square Houses

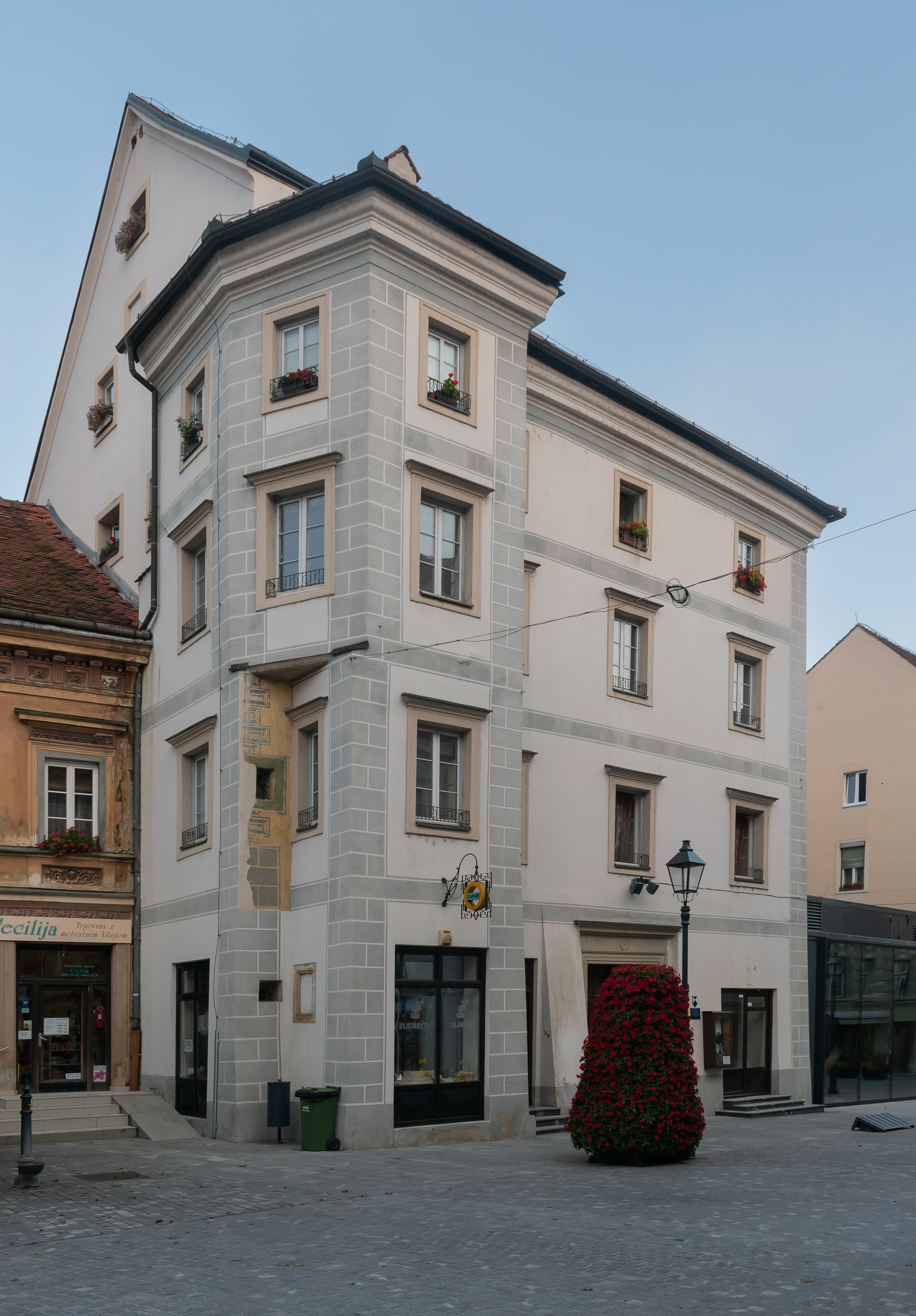
Hohenwarter house

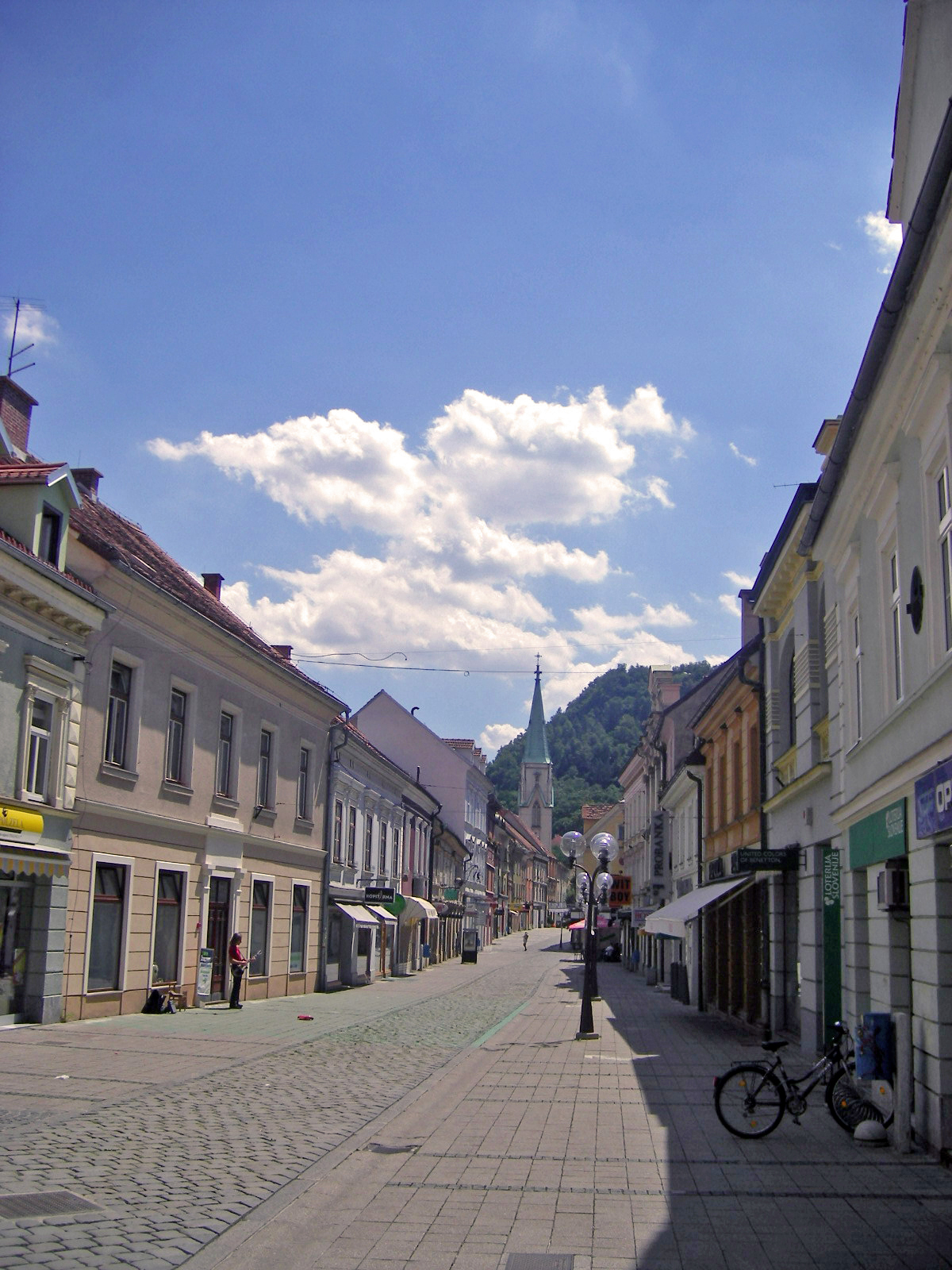
Stane Street

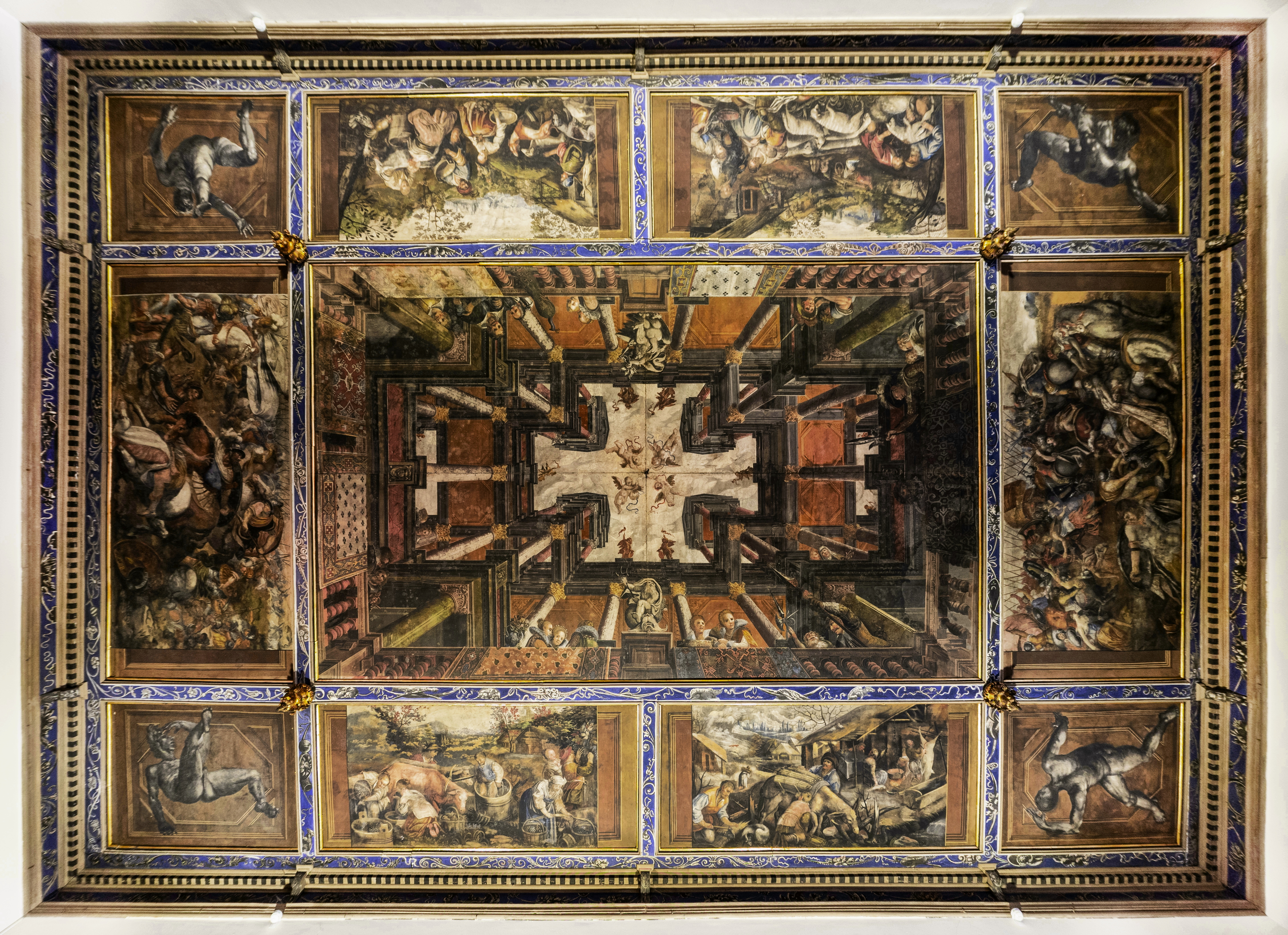
The Celje Ceiling from the Old's Counts Mansion

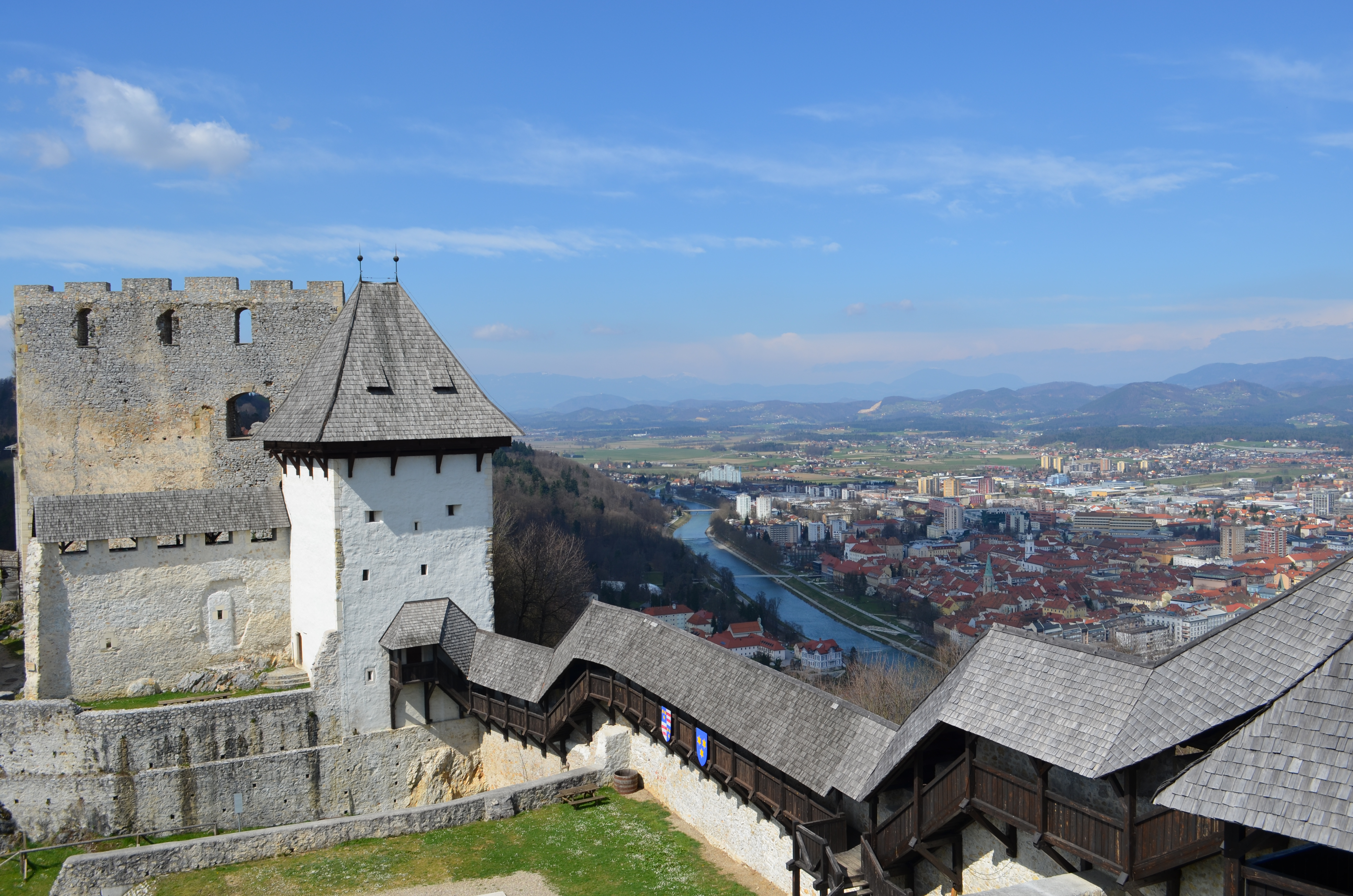
View from the Castle

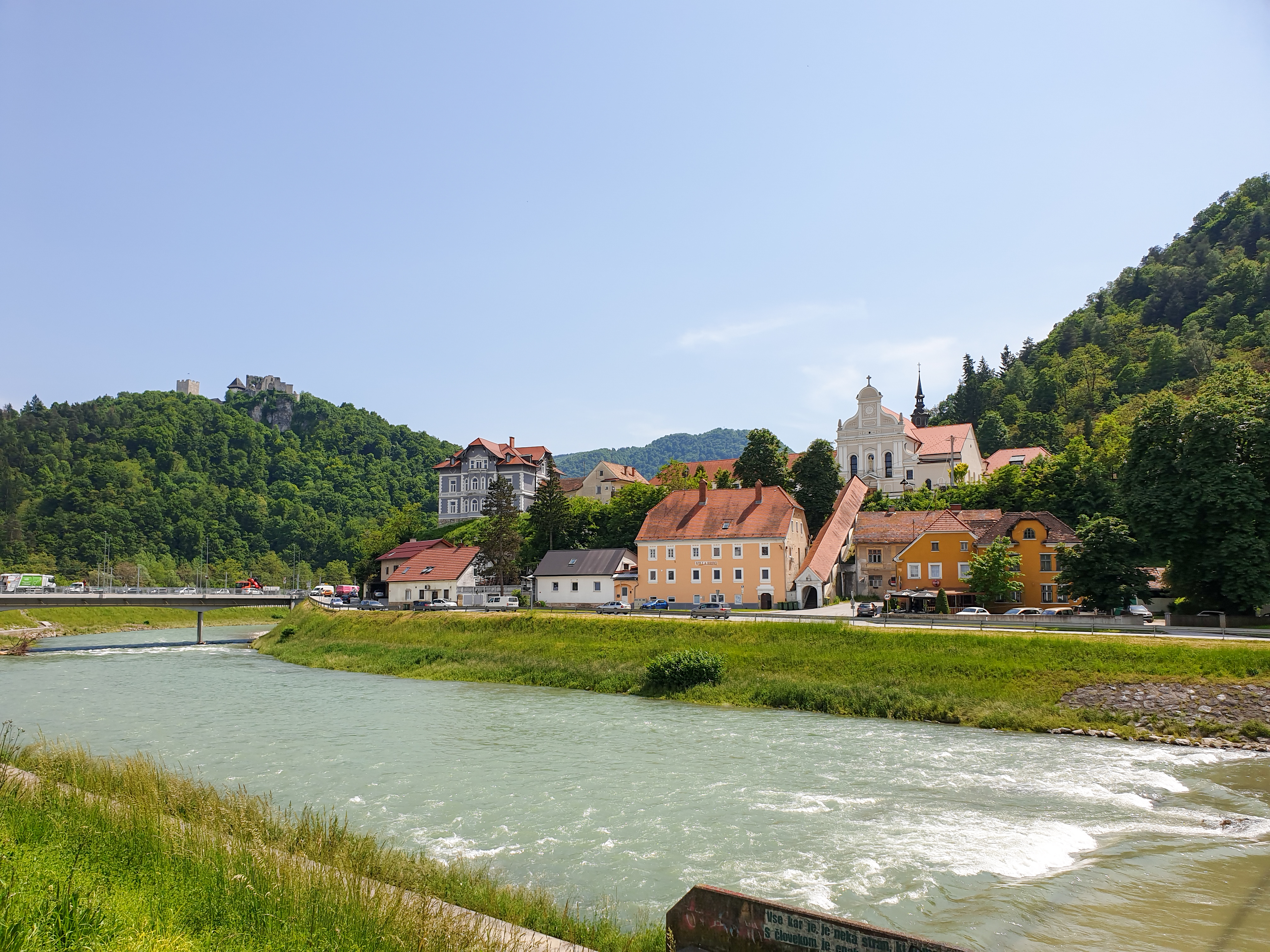
View over the river
