= Hudinja =

Hudinja is a Slovene name that may refer to:

- Hudinja (district), a district of the City Municipality of Celje and a neighbourhood of Celje
- Hudinja (river), a river of Celje
- Hudinja, Vitanje, a village in the Municipality of Vitanje, northeastern Slovenia
