= Gaberje =

Gaberje is a Slovene place name that may refer to:

- Gaberje (district), a district of the City Municipality of Celje and a neighbourhood of Celje
- Gaberje, Ajdovščina, a village in the Municipality of Ajdovščina, southwestern Slovenia
- Gaberje, Lendava, a village in the Municipality of Lendava, northeastern Slovenia
