= Center, Celje =

Coordinates: 46°13′49″N 15°15′44″E

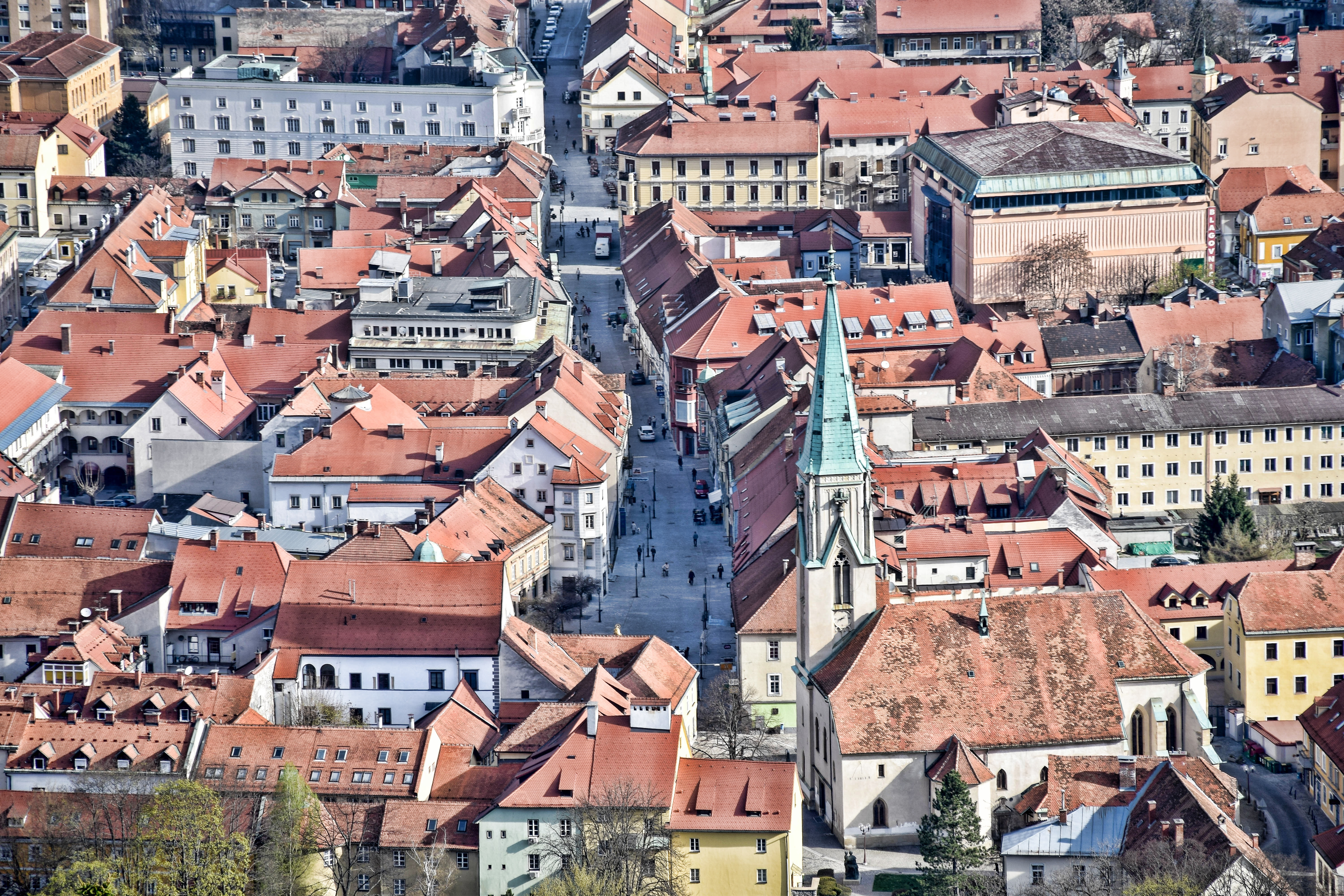
View of the Celje center Main Square and Stane street

Center is a district (Slovene: mestna četrt) and the central neighborhood of the city of Celje in central-eastern Slovenia.
