= Dejan Glavnik =

Slovenian cyclist

- Born: September 26, 1975 (age 50); Celje, SR Slovenia, SFR Yugoslavia
- Citizenship: Slovenian
- Occupation: Endurance cyclist
- Known for: Cycling around the world (2006–2011)

Dejan Glavnik (born 26 September 1975) is a Slovenian endurance cyclist who completed a five-year journey around the world by bicycle, during which he travelled more than 112,000 kilometres across dozens of countries.

== Early life and career ==
Glavnik was born in Celje, Slovenia, and grew up in Breg pri Polzeli. He began training in endurance sports at a young age, initially focusing on running and cycling. As a teenager, he competed in triathlon and duathlon, becoming a member of the Slovenian national team and winning multiple national titles.

His early athletic career ended following a serious traffic accident during training in the United States, after which he shifted his focus toward long-distance cycling and endurance challenges.

=== Around-the-world journey ===
On 22 April 2006, Glavnik began a global cycling expedition from his hometown of Celje. Over the course of five years, he travelled more than 112,000 kilometres across multiple continents, visiting dozens of countries before returning home in July 2011.

The journey included travel through Europe, the Americas, Asia, Africa, and Oceania, and is regarded as one of the longest continuous solo cycling expeditions undertaken by a Slovenian cyclist.
