= Ostrožno (local community) =

Coordinates: 46°15′06″N 15°15′07″E

Ostrožno (pronounced [ɔˈstɾoːʒnɔ]) is a local community (Slovene: krajevna skupnost) of the City Municipality of Celje in central-eastern Slovenia. Until 1982, Ostrožno was an independent settlement.
