= Celje Post Office =

Coordinates: 46°13′46.17″N 15°16′2.62″E

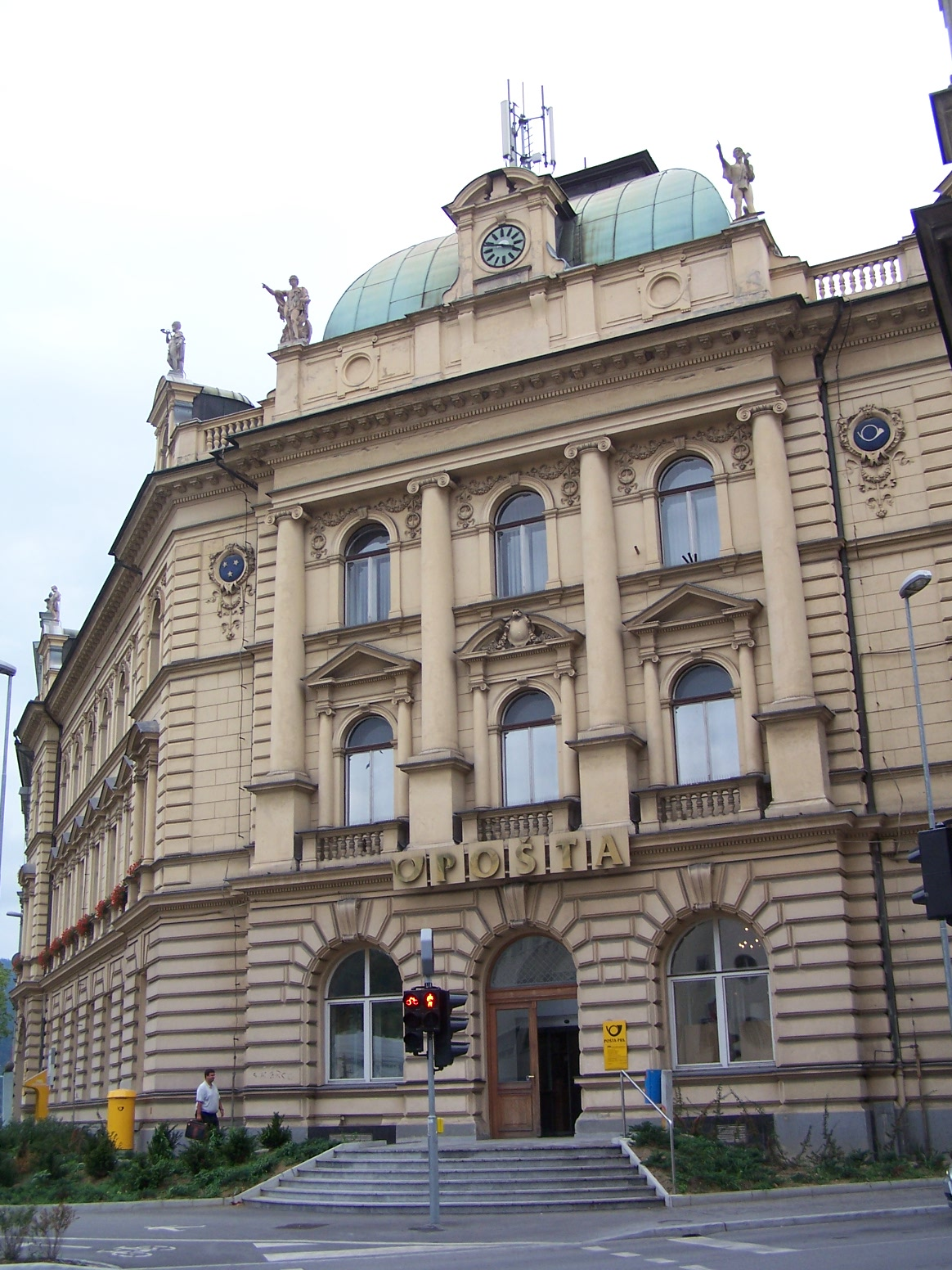
Main entrance to the Celje Post Office

The Celje Post Office (Slovene: Pošta Celje) is the administrative post office in the city of Celje, Slovenia. Celje used the post number 63000 between 1945 and 1991. Since 1991, when Slovenia became independent, it uses the number SI-3000.

The building of the Celje Post Office stands at 9 Krek Square. It was built in the neo-Renaissance style in 1898 upon the plans by Bureau für Postbauten company from Vienna. It is protected as a local cultural monument.
