= Fran Roš =

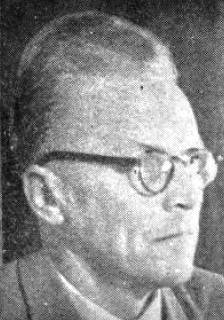
- Born: 14 January 1898; Kranj, Duchy of Carniola, Austria-Hungary (now in Slovenia)
- Died: 22 August 1976 (aged 78); Celje, Yugoslavia (now Slovenia)
- Occupations: Writer, poet, playwright

Fran Roš (pronounced [ˈfɾaːn ˈɾoːʃ], 14 January 1898 – 22 August 1976) was a Slovene writer, poet, and playwright.

== Life ==
Fran Roš was born in Kranj. In 1902, when he was three years old, his family moved to Celje. He attended the local boys' school, where he was on the honor roll. He then enrolled in the lower secondary school and continued his education at the German-language upper secondary school. After the First World War he joined militants that sought to include parts of Carinthia in the newly formed Kingdom of Yugoslavia. He then studied law in Zagreb, but was more attracted by teaching schoolchildren. He served as a schoolteacher in Prebold from 1919 to 1925 and then in Celje from 1925 to 1941. During the Second World War he and his family were exiled to Serbia by the German authorities because of his political views. He returned to Celje after four years in exile. He became a school principal during the first academic year after the war, and then taught at a high school and teacher training school. He retired at age 55 and then further developed as a poet. During his retirement he was invited to schools to read his poetry and prose.

Roš received a number of Yugoslav awards for his work, including the Order of Labor (Third Class), Order of Service to the Nation with Silver Rays, and Order of Brotherhood and Unity with a Silver Wreath. He was also honored by Celje by being named an honorary citizen of the town.

== Work ==
Roš started writing poetry while still a schoolchild and published his poems in the student newsletter Savinja. His poetry had an anti-Austrian character, and so during the First World War he was persecuted by the Austrian educational and military authorities. While teaching in Prebold he became familiar with conditions in industrial centers, and he published a number of works in the left-oriented magazines Svoboda and Domači prijatelj. During his exile in Serbia he wrote Pesmi iz ječe in pregnanstva (Poems of Prison and Exile), which he published soon after returning to Celje. Another noteworthy work was his book Slovenski izseljenci v Srbiji 1941–1945 (Slovene Emigrants in Serbia 1941–1945), in which he described the memories and testimonies of those that were exiled.

Roš also wrote a considerable body of narrative work expressing goodness, nobility, ethnic consciousness, and connections to justice. Zvesta četa (The Faithful Company, 1933) is an autobiographical description of his generation. He also published many novellas, sketches, and serial stories in various periodicals based on his memories from his childhood and early years. Some of these also appeared in his book Korporal Huš in druge zgodbe (Corporal Huš and Other Stories). Roš also contributed journalism about Rudolf Maister, Franjo Malgaj, Srečko Puncer, the Šlander family, and the 1938 and 1939 Celje culture weeks to Celjski zbornik, and about the rebel Boštjan Natek and the composer Risto Savin to Savinjski zbornik.

Roš wrote most of his children's poetry while his children were young and while engaged with schoolchildren and later his own grandchildren. He published his poetry and sketches for children in the magazines Zvonček, Vrtec, and Naš rod during the interwar period, and after the war in the Trieste magazine Galeb and in Kurirček. In addition to the stories that he published in children's magazines, he also published the books Medvedek Rjavček (The Little Brown Bear, 1929, 1931), Juretovo potovanje (George's Trip, 1939), Letalec Nejček (Bart the Pilot, 1972), and Vid Nikdarsit (Vitus Neverfull, 1976).

He also wrote two plays for children, which were staged in Celje: Ušesa carja Kozmijana (Tsar Cosmian's Ears, 1948) and Desetnica Alenčica (Magda the Tenth-Born, 1951). For adults, he wrote the comedy Mokrodolci (The People of Mokri Dol), staged in 1946. He also collaborated with the composer Risto Savin, for whom he wrote librettos for the operas Gosposvetski sen (Maria Saal Dream, 1921) and Matija Gubec (1923).

== Bibliography ==
=== Poetry ===
- Gosposvetski sen, 1923
- Pesmi iz ječe in pregnanstva, 1947
- Ljubil sem te, življenje, 1990
- Čarovnije, 1992

=== Adult prose ===
- Zvesta četa, 1933
- Korporal Huš in druge zgodbe, 1971
- Srečko Puncer njegovo življenje, delo in boj, 1972
- Halo, halo! Tukaj Mokri dol!, 1991
- Ne bodo nas!, Osnovna šola Fran Roš, Celje, 1991

=== Children's prose ===
- Medvedek Rjavček, 1929
- Juretovo potovanje in še kaj, 1930
- Dija, 1939
- Medvedek Dija, 1962
- Letalec Nejček, 1972
- Vid Nikdarsit, 1976
- Tinca brez mezinca, 1977
- Žaba na golem vrhu, 1990

=== Plays ===
- Mokrodolci, 1946
- Desetnica Alenčica, 1951
- Car Trojan ima kozja ušesa, 1990
- Čarobna piščalka, 195?

=== Historical documentaries ===
- Resevna 1941-1961, 1961
- Slovenski izgnanci v Srbiji 1941–1945, 1967

== Selected bibliography ==
- Medvedek rjavček: povesti za mladino, 1929
- Mokrodolci: komedija v treh dejanjih, 1946
- Pesmi iz ječe in pregnanstva (poezije), 1947
- Desetnica Alenčica: igra za otroke v treh dejanjih, 1951
- Medvedek dija (pravljice), 1962
- Korporal Huš in druge zgodbe (kratka proza), 1971
- Letalec Nječek (pravljice), 1972
- Tinca brez mezinca (kratka proza), 1977
- Car Trojan ima kozja ušesa: radijska igra: po srbski narodni pripovedki, 1990
- Žaba na golem vrhu : zbirka otroške proze (kratka proza), 1990
- Halo, halo! Tukaj Mokri dol! humoreske, satire in še kaj, 1991
- Ne bodo nas! zbirka proze iz narodnoosvobodilne vojne, 1991
- Čarovnije (pojezija), 1992
- Čarobna piščalka: (pravljica v treh dejanjih), 195?

== Prizes and awards ==
In 1960 Roš received the Šlander Award (a municipal prize), and two years before his death he received the Žagar Award as recognition of his work in education.
