= Judgement Tower =

Coordinates: 46°33′24.6″N 15°38′29.04″E

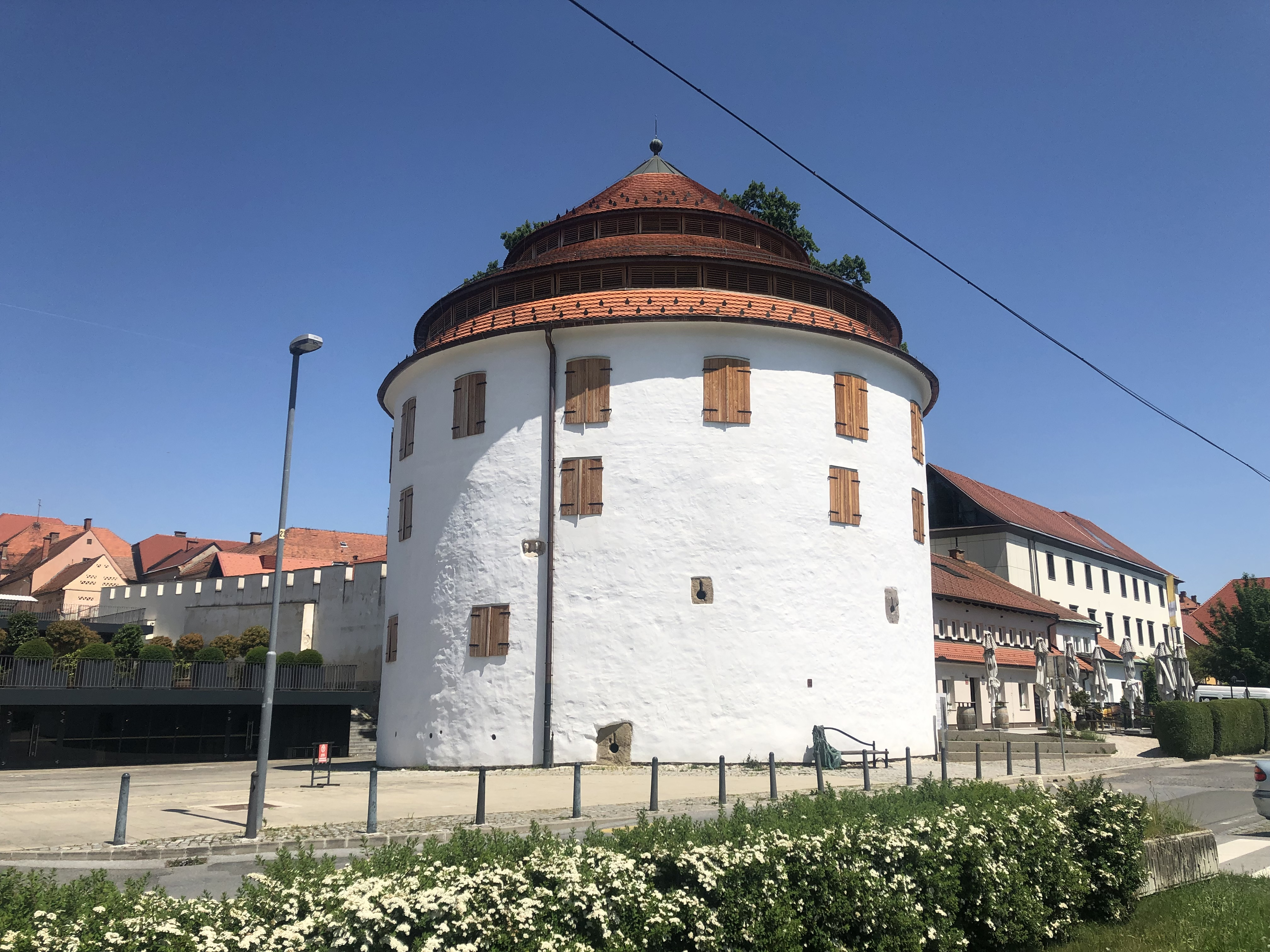
Judgement Tower in 2022

The Judgement Tower (Slovene: Sodni stolp) is a fortified medieval tower in the city of Maribor, Slovenia. An original tower built on the site in the early 14th century secured the southwestern corner of the city walls. It was completely rebuilt in 1540, with the addition of a conical roof which burned down in the 17th century.

The tower has seen several additions; the Renaissance structure extends to the tops of the second-floor windows, and is followed an early 17th-century extension. Four more floors were added in the 19th century.

The tower partially burned down again in 1937 and was restored in the 1950s. It is one of several surviving elements of the former city walls; others include the Water Tower and the Jewish Tower, while the Benetke Tower was demolished in the late 1960s to make way for a hydroelectric reservoir.
