= Savinja (district) =

District in Slovenia

Coordinates: 46°14′04″N 15°15′11″E

Savinja is a district (Slovene: mestna četrt) of the Urban Municipality of Celje and a neighbourhood of the city of Celje in Slovenia. One of Slovenia's coal regions, it is named after the Savinja River.
