= Lea Jagodič =

Slovenian basketball player

Personal information
- Born: 12 February 1991 (age 35) Celje, SFR Yugoslavia
- Listed height: 1.82 m (6 ft 0 in)

Career information
- WNBA draft: 2013: undrafted
- Playing career: –2013
- Position: Small forward / power forward

Career history
- Sentjur
- Athlete Celje
- 2012–2013: A.S.D. San Martino

Lea Jagodič (born 12 February 1991) is a Slovenian female professional basketball player.
