= Lava (district) =

Coordinates: 46°14′37″N 15°15′09″E

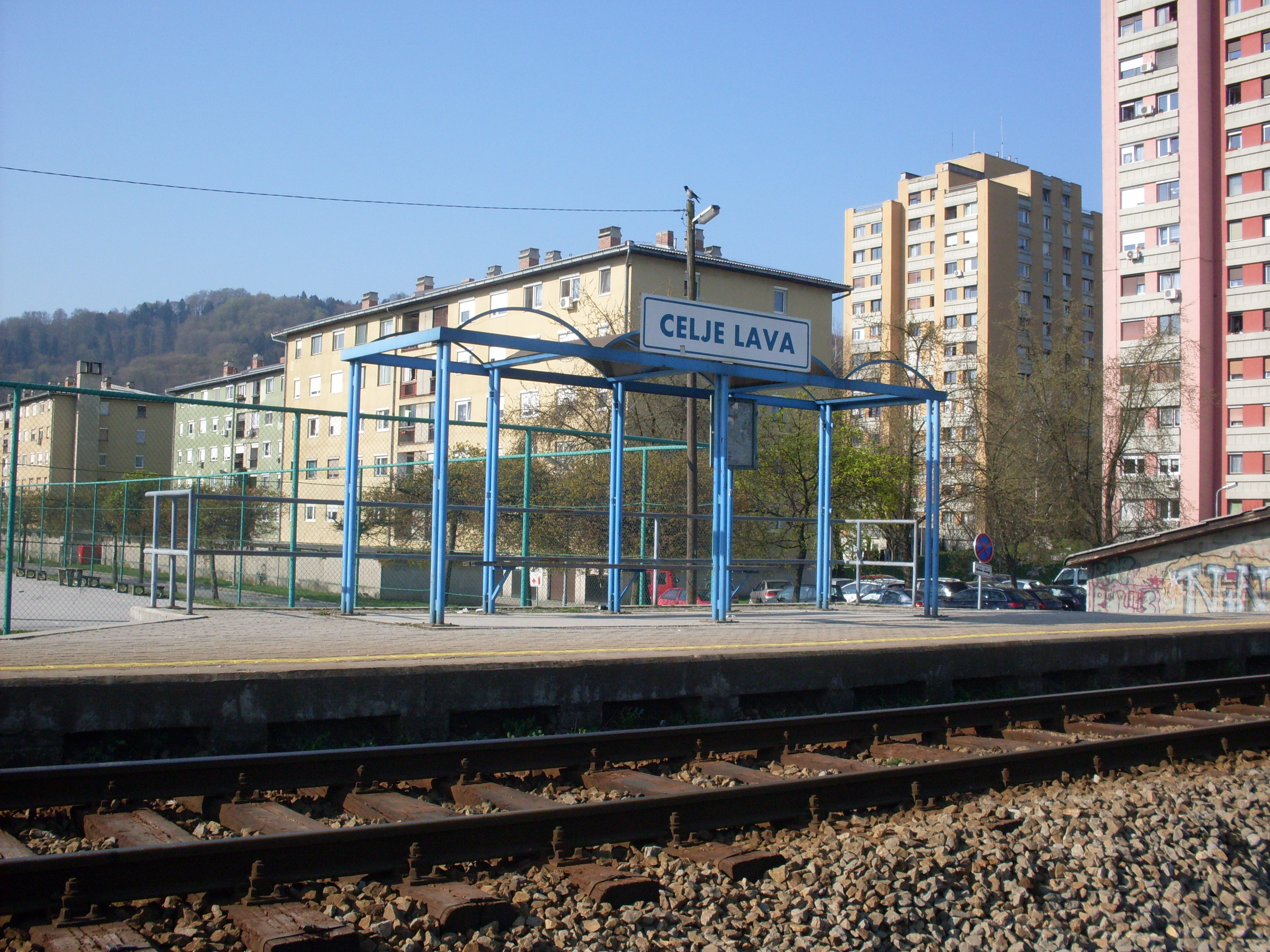
The rail halt in Lava

Lava (pronounced [ˈlaːʋa]) is a district (Slovene: mestna četrt) of the City Municipality of Celje and a locality in the northwestern part of the city of Celje. Until 1982, Lava was an independent settlement.
