= Ostrožno, Celje =

Ostrožno
- Location in Slovenia
- Coordinates: 46°15′06″N 15°14′45″E
- Country: Slovenia
- Traditional region: Styria
- Statistical region: Savinja
- Municipality: Celje
- Elevation: 250 m (820 ft)

Ostrožno (pronounced [ɔˈstɾoːʒnɔ]; German: Forstwald or Ostroschno) is a former settlement in the City Municipality of Celje in northeastern Slovenia. It is now part of the city of Celje. The area is part of the traditional region of Styria. The municipality is now included in the Savinja Statistical Region.

== Geography ==
Ostrožno is a scattered settlement northwest of the city center of Celje; most of the settlement is on a plain and part of it extends into rolling terrain to the north. The regulated course of Koprivnica Creek turns to the west at Ostrožno and flows south of the settlement. It is bordered by Babno to the southwest, Ložnica pri Celju to the south, and Lopata to the north. The soil has a high loam and clay content.

== Name ==
The name Ostrožno, like related names (e.g., Ostrog and Ostrožno Brdo), is derived from the common noun ostrog 'settlement surround by a palisade', referring to the configuration of the settlement in the past.

== History ==
Under the Counts of Celje in the 14th and 15th centuries, Ostrožno was part of the feudal forest extending to Celje. In the mid-18th century, excavations on Ostrožno Hill revealed medieval walls. Farming activity did not start in the village until the 18th century, and agriculture intensified after 1842, when the old feudal estate was divided. Clay deposits in Ostrožno were exploited for brickmaking in the nineteenth century, when brick kilns were active for several decades.

During the Second World War, members of the Vedenik family in the village were shot or sent to a concentration camp, where they died. This is now commemorated by a plaque at house no. 79 in the village. On September 18, 1952 Josip Broz Tito delivered a speech in a meadow at Ostrožno; in preparation for this event, high-quality road connections were built to the village.

Ostrožno was annexed by Celje in 1982, ending its existence as an independent settlement.
