= Aljažev Hrib =

Coordinates: 46°13′44.64″N 15°16′9.48″E

Aljažev Hrib (pronounced [aˈljaːʒɛu̯ ˈxɾiːp]; Slovene: Aljažev hrib) is a local community (krajevna skupnost) in the City Municipality of Celje in Slovenia.
