= Dečkovo Naselje =

Coordinates: 46°14′38″N 15°15′40″E

Dečkovo Naselje (Slovene: Dečkovo naselje) is a district (mestna četrt) and a neighborhood of the city of Celje in Slovenia.
