= Dolgo Polje =

District of Celje, Slovenia

Coordinates: 46°14′14″N 15°15′56″E

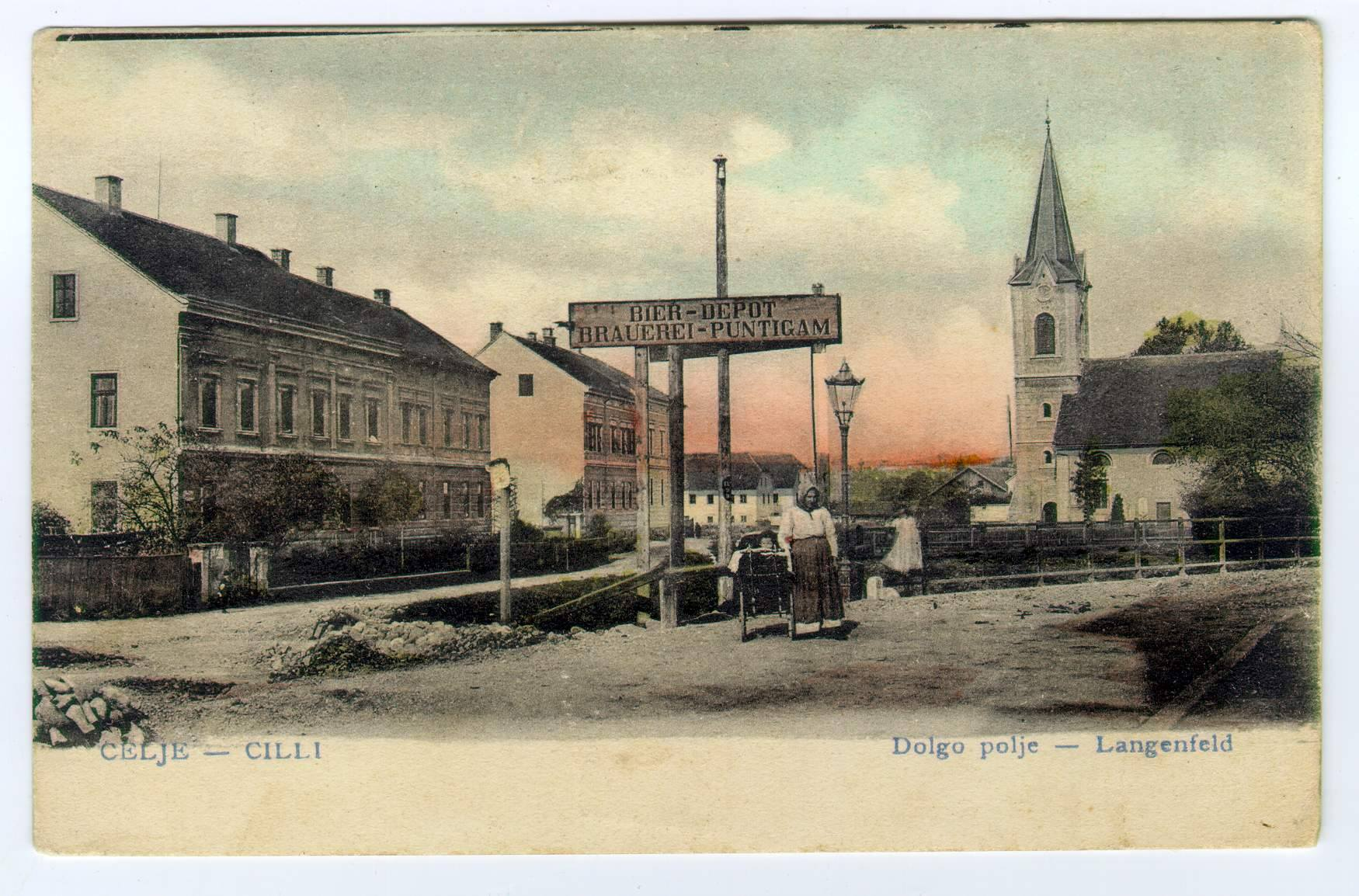
1905 postcard of Dolgo Polje

Dolgo Polje (pronounced [ˈdoːu̯ɡɔ ˈpoːljɛ]; Slovene: Dolgo polje) is a district (mestna četrt) of the City Municipality of Celje and a neighborhood of the city of Celje in central-eastern Slovenia.

== Geography ==
Dolgo Polje lies at an elevation of approximately 238 meters (781 ft), near the Savinja River and its tributaries, including the Hudinja, Ložnica, and Voglajna rivers.

== Name ==
Dolgo Polje was known as Langefeld in German. Both the Slovene and German names mean 'long field'. It was originally an agricultural area divided into selions.
