= Pod Gradom =

Coordinates: 46°12′55″N 15°15′56″E

Pod Gradom (Slovene: Pod gradom) is a local community (Slovene: krajevna skupnost) of the City Municipality of Celje in central-eastern Slovenia.
