= Celje Water Tower =

Fortified tower in Celje, Slovenia

Coordinates: 46°13′35.69″N 15°15′57.12″E

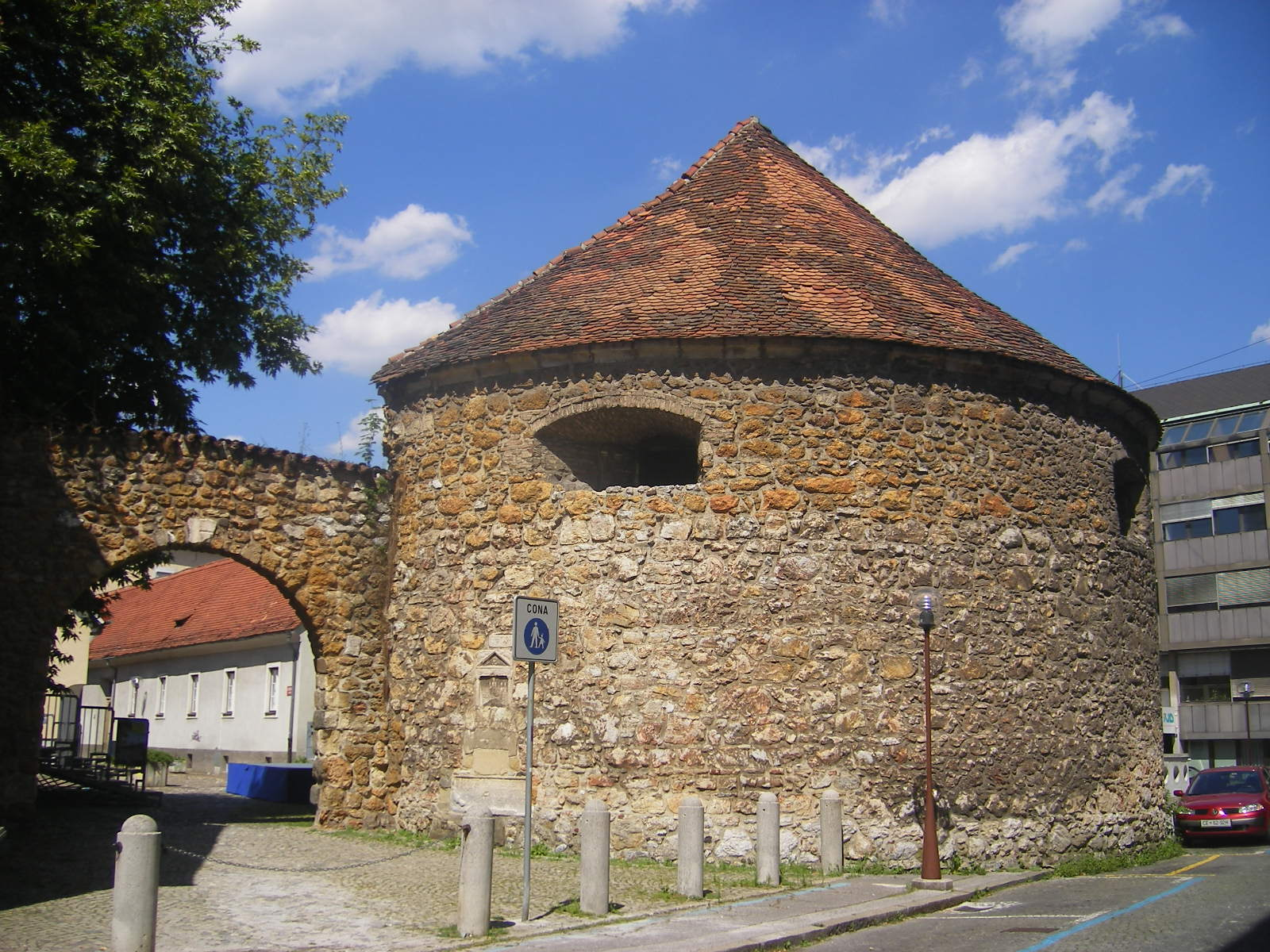
The water tower in Celje is built of stone and has a conical roof.

The Celje Water Tower (Slovene: Vodni stolp v Celju) is a well-preserved part of the town walls of Celje, Slovenia. It was built as a corner tower after 1451 and redesigned in the 16th century. Since 2010, it has been protected as a cultural monument of local significance.
