= Maribor Water Tower =

Fortified tower in Maribor, Slovenia

- Slovenia
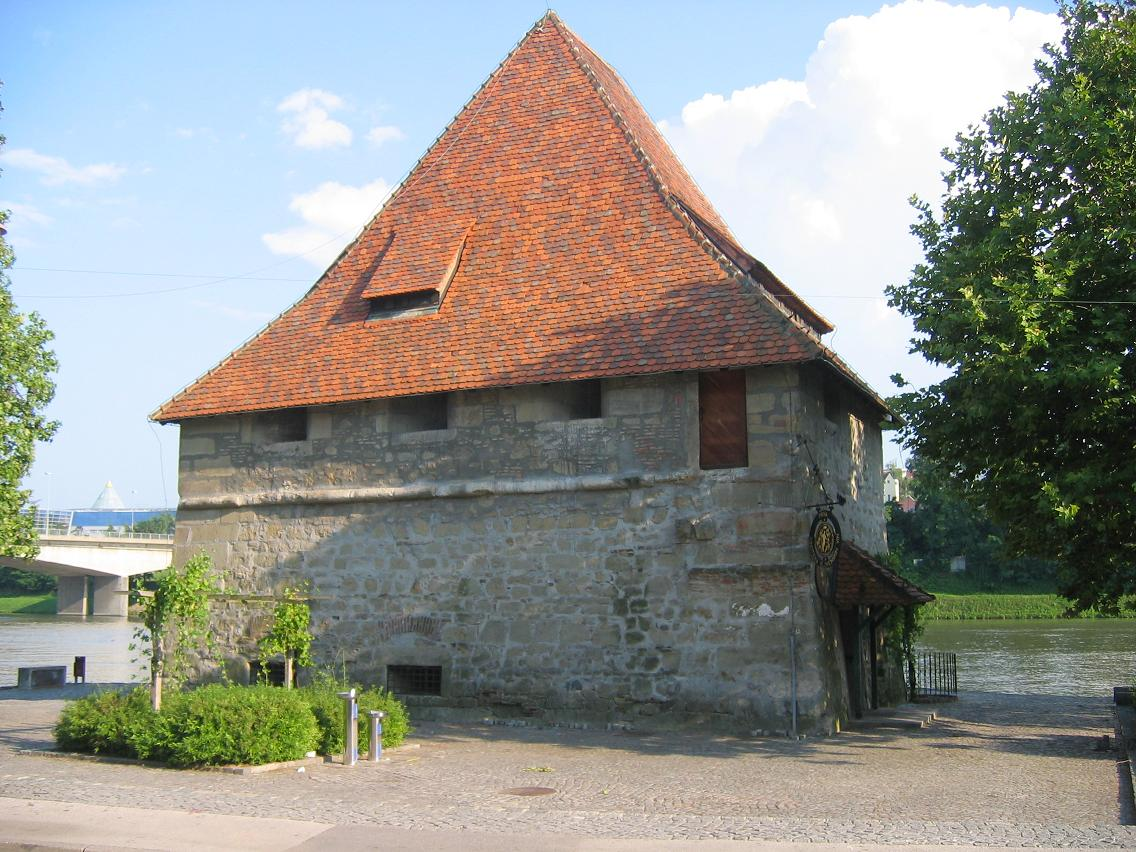
- Water Tower

Location
- Coordinates: 46.557°N 15.645°E

Site history
- Materials: Limestone

The Maribor Water Tower (Slovene: Vodni stolp) is a medieval fortified tower in the city of Maribor, Slovenia. The late-Renaissance tower stands directly abuts the Drava River and dates from 1555. It is of pentagonal form and consists of massive stone blocks interspersed with embrasures. It was built to secure the southeast part of the Maribor city walls from the direction of the river.

== History ==
Before the mid-16th century, the southern part of the Maribor city walls was guarded by two round defensive towers, the predecessor of the current Jewish Tower and the predecessor of the Water Tower, known as the Gunpowder Tower (Slovene: Smodniški stolp), mentioned as of 1529. Around 1555, a decision was made to extend the city's defensive fortifications against Turkish raids to include the municipal port. Italian master builders erected two bastions on the Drava, a tower that came to be known as Mariborske Benetke ("Maribor Venice") to the west and the water tower to the east. The city gates once stood between the Benetke Tower and the Judgement Tower.

A site called Pristan ("quay") or Lent had earlier developed outside the walls, serving as the mercantile center of old Maribor. Until the construction of the Carinthian railway between Maribor and Klagenfurt in 1863, the Benetke port building saw annual eastward-bound traffic of up to 800 šajke (characteristic local barges) and 1200 rafts.

During the 1960s, the Drava was dammed at Melje for the Zlatoličje Hydroelectric Plant, causing the water levels to rise. Much of the old urban core of Maribor was due to be submerged in the resultant reservoir, including the Water Tower, which was originally slated for demolition so as not to pose a hazard to navigation.

Between 1966 and 1967, the Benetke Tower and many medieval houses on the riverbanks were torn down, but the position of the Water Tower made it a better prospect for salvageability. The tower was saved by the efforts of builder Jože Požauk (1908–1995), who directed a project to raise the 1500 t mass by 2.6 metres over seven months in 1967 and 1968.

At present, the Water Tower houses a wine shop which specializes in top-quality Slovenian wines. It is Slovenia's oldest wine cellar, and is situated in what is now the center of Maribor. The shop is on the ground floor. The top floor of the tower contains a large, round hall with a high ceiling, reminiscent of a medieval banquet hall, which is dedicated entirely to wine tasting. The world's oldest grapevine is located on the side of a building a few hundred metres away.

== See also ==
- List of castles in Slovenia
