= Hudinja (district) =

District of Celje, Slovenia

Coordinates: 46°14′55.26″N 15°16′34.05″E

Hudinja (pronounced [xuˈdiːnja]) is a district (mestna četrt) along the Hudinja in the northern part of Celje, Slovenia. Hudinja consists of two informal parts: Spodnja Hudinja (literally, 'Lower Hudinja') and Zgornja Hudinja (literally, 'Upper Hudinja'). It is named after the Hudinja River, a tributary of the Savinja, which flows through it. Zgornja Hudinja was an independent settlement until 1982.

A modern sports center was recently built in Hudinja. The main buildings are the Arena Petrol football stadium (built between 1999 and 2003) and the Zlatorog Arena.
