= Gaberje (district) =

Coordinates: 46°14′11″N 15°16′23″E

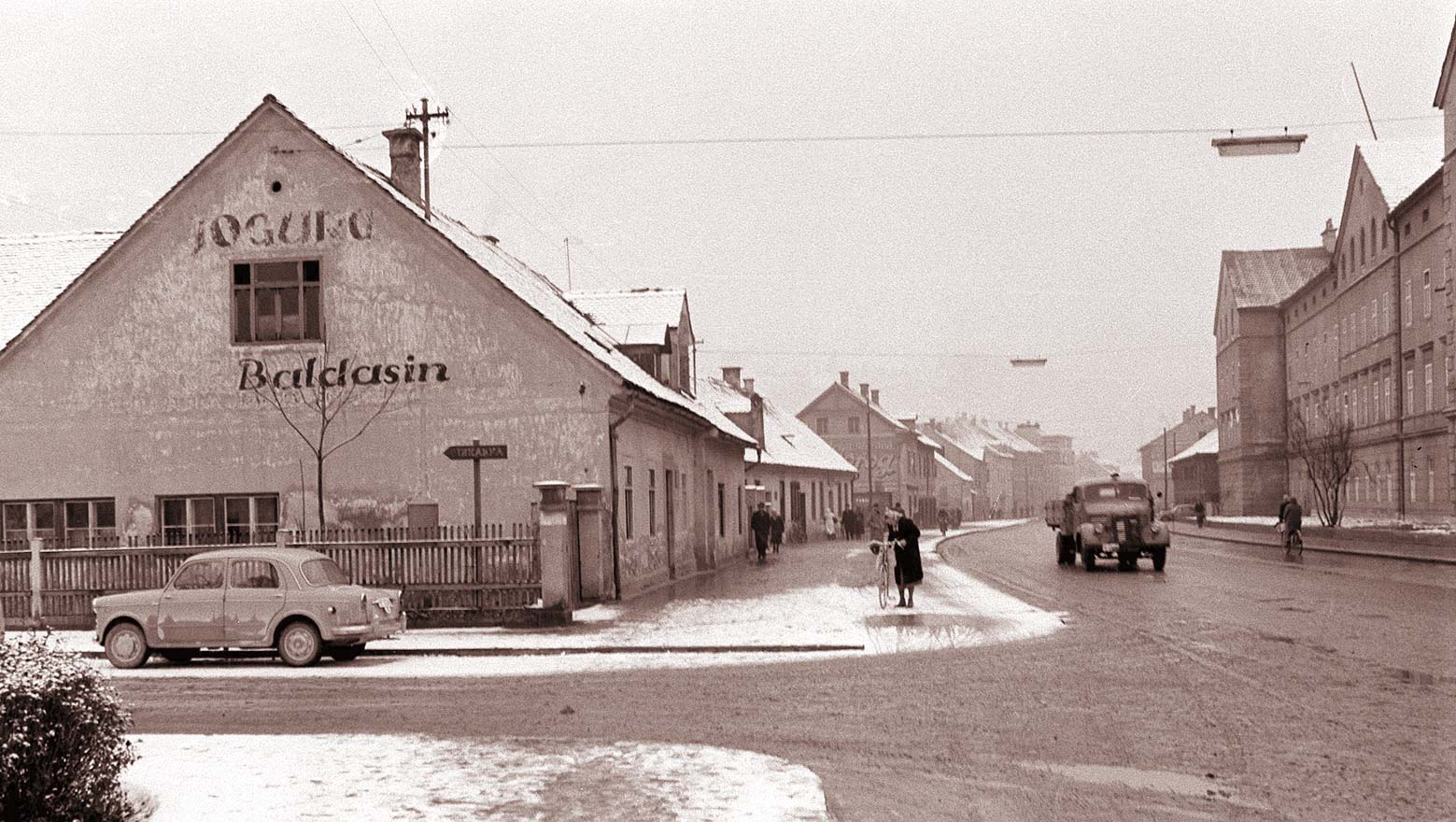
Gaberje in 1960

Gaberje (pronounced [ˈɡaːbɛɾjɛ]) is a district (mestna četrt) of the City Municipality of Celje and a neighbourhood of the town of Celje in central-eastern Slovenia. It is particularly known as a workers' settlement.

Gaberje includes residential housing and industrial buildings. The Cinkarna Celje zinc smelter, which began operations in 1873 on land in Gaberje, was one of the first industries in the district.

The Gaberje Celje Partisan Hockey Club, a field hockey club established in Gaberje, achieved prominence in the 1960s, winning multiple Slovenian championships before it ceased operations in 1995.
