= Novi Klošter Monastery =

Former Dominican priory in Slovenia

Novi klošter (Konferenčni center Polzela)
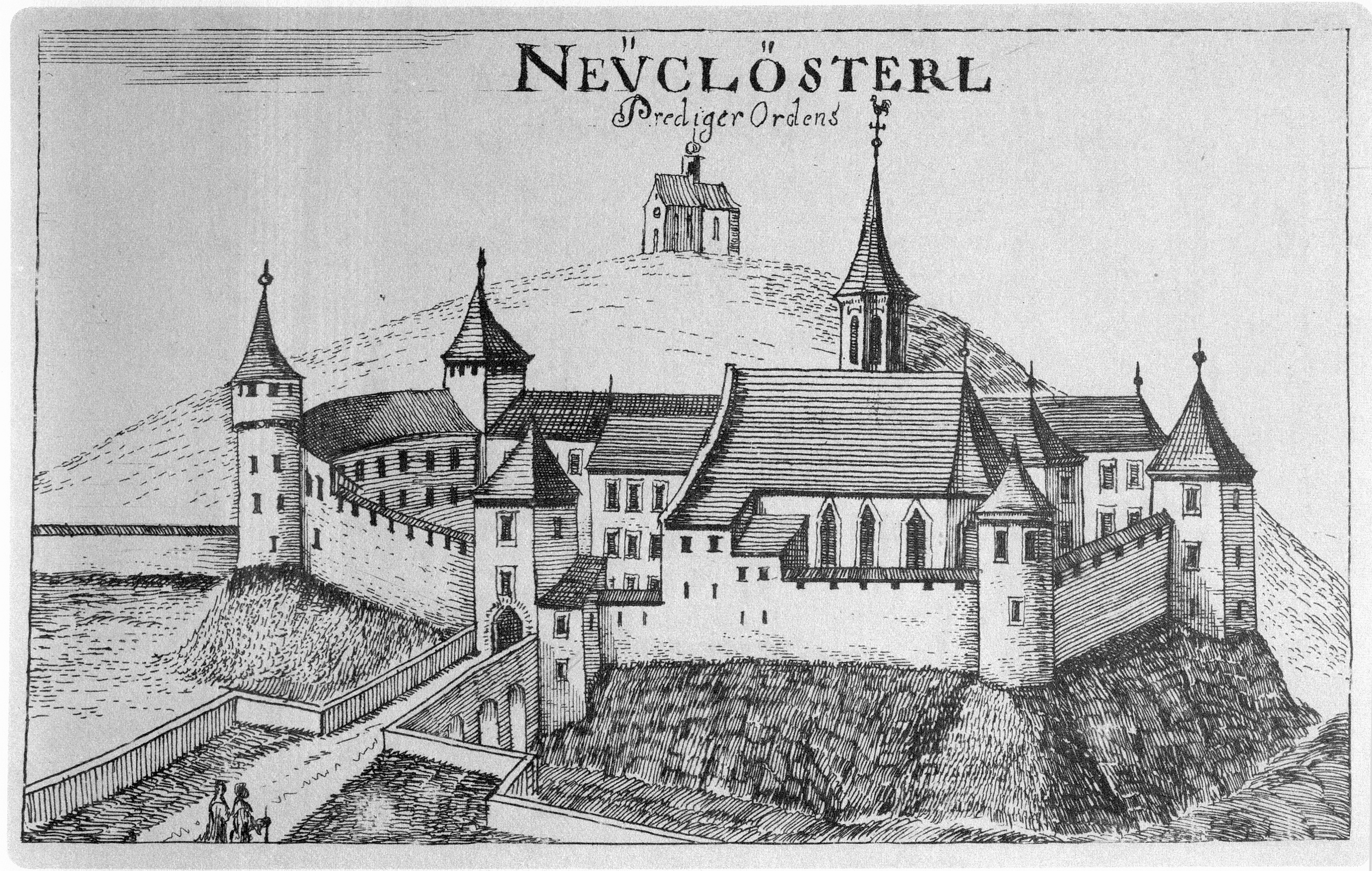
- Novi Klošter in 17th Century

- Location within Slovenia
- 46°17′13″N 15°6′14″E
- Location: Založe, Municipality of Polzela, Slovenia
- Nearest city: Celje

Novi Klošter (from German: Neukloster > "The New Cloister") is a former Dominican priory near Polzela (Slovenia), built in the mid-15th century by Frederick II, Count of Celje.

The monastery had a chequered history, having been invaded by the Ottomans shortly after its foundation, attacked by peasants, used as a fortress and novitiate, and much of the building damaged by fire.

The monastery was dissolved by the imperial edict of Joseph II in 1787. Subsequent owners rebuilt it several times and considerably altered its original appearance. The present neo-Gothic and mansion-style appearance dates from the early 19th century.

After the World War II, part of the building was used for residential purposes, but otherwise left to decay. Since 2010, it has been gradually restored by its new owner, the Zavod Tromostovje. As a conference centre it hosts social, cultural, educational and spiritual events.

== History ==
=== Dominican Priory ===
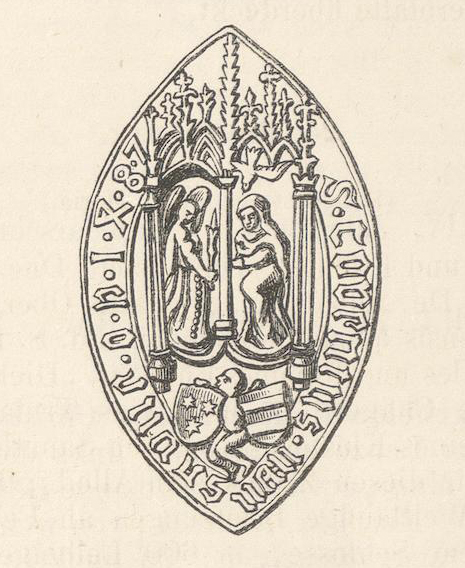
Monastery seal from 1487

The founding of the priory is closely linked to the Counts of Celje, as it was erected in the hunting grounds of Frederick II, who issued the foundation charter in 1453. With the consent of the Patriarch of Aquileia, Ludovico Trevisan, and Pope Nicholas V, he donated the monastery with the church and the nearby estates to the Dominican Order. The Dominicans were Frederick's confessors towards the end of his life and, according to the historian Jože Mlinarič, it is likely that the monastery was founded so"that the Dominicans should become the guardians of his earthly remains and the prayers for the repose of his soul, which was burdened with so many vices.« After the extinction of the Counts of Celje, the Habsburg emperor Frederick III confirmed the friars' rights and estates in 1459.

In 1479, the monastery was seized and captured by the Ottomans. Three friars, including the prior, were enslaved and one was killed. The places of worship were desecrated and many sacred images and statues smashed. The place was then abandoned for several years. In the late 15th century, the vicar general of Aquileia reconsecrated the altar and called on the faithful to help fortify the monastery and protect it from further attacks.

After being rebuilt in the 16th century, it served as a fortress with a defensive wall, moat and five towers, but repeated attacks and high taxes left it in material distress. Dominicans had to mortgage parts of their scattered properties and take out loans, which increased their debt. The crisis was later resolved by the support of the Landstände. In addition to the economic difficulties, friars' monastic life and discipline was negatively impacted by protestantism, although the apostasy was not significant. A 1593 visitation reports that the monastery "is guarded as a fortress by the brethren [and] their servants" and that "they live in libertinage."

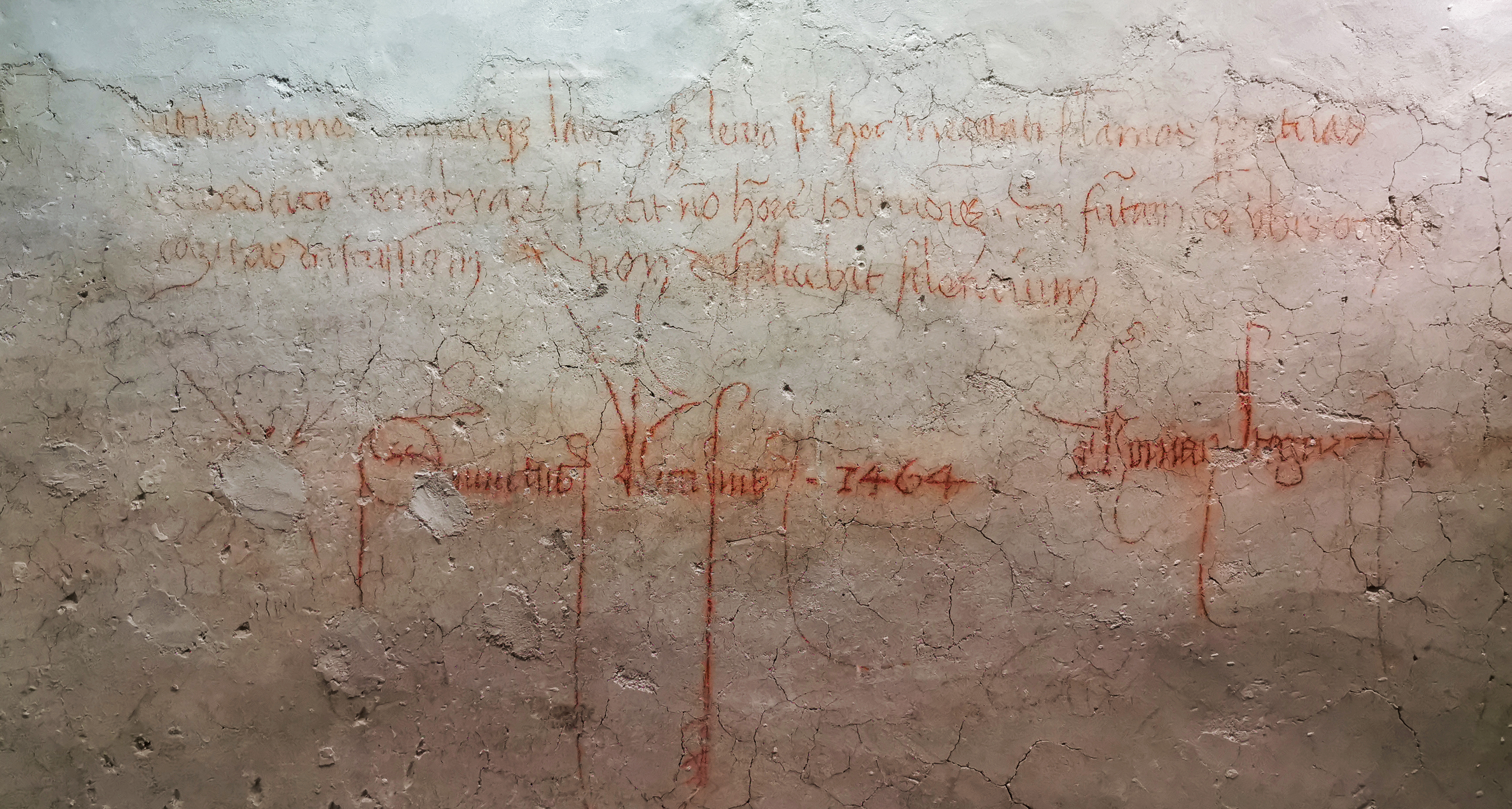
Latin inscription in Novi Klošter

In 1635, during the Second Slovene Peasant Revolt, it was occupied and plundered by local inhabitants, who rebelled against the Dominicans for excessive taxes and socage. They addressed their complaints to the Inner Austrian government, which informed monastery's leaders about the peasants' demands and instructed them to settle. The two sides were able to reach an agreement only after several months. Nevertheless, relations remained tense until the end of the century. The procurator of priory, Dominik Majhen, was particularly harsh with the subjects, causing problems also to his brethren.

In the early 18th century, Novi Klošter served as a novitiate. The friars revived popular devotions and founded confraternities of the rosary. In the mid-18th century, the complex was struck by lightning and damaged by fire, which destroyed the bell tower and part of the church of Our Lady, as well as most of the buildings.

=== Mansion ===
By the 1787 Edict on Idle Institutions, the monastery was dissolved and its assets, which after deduction of debts amounted to 90,736 florins, confiscated. Some of the friars and the prior left for Graz, others for Breže in Carinthia. The Gothic statue of the Virgin Mary with Jesus, or the seated Madonna, which is now in the Church of St Peter in Šempeter, and the organ, which was transferred to Stranice, preserved. Many books and art objects were lost or sent abroad, especially to Graz and Vienna. After the dissolution, the education of the local population continued in the monastery facilities until 1794, when the elementary school (trivialka) was moved to Polzela.

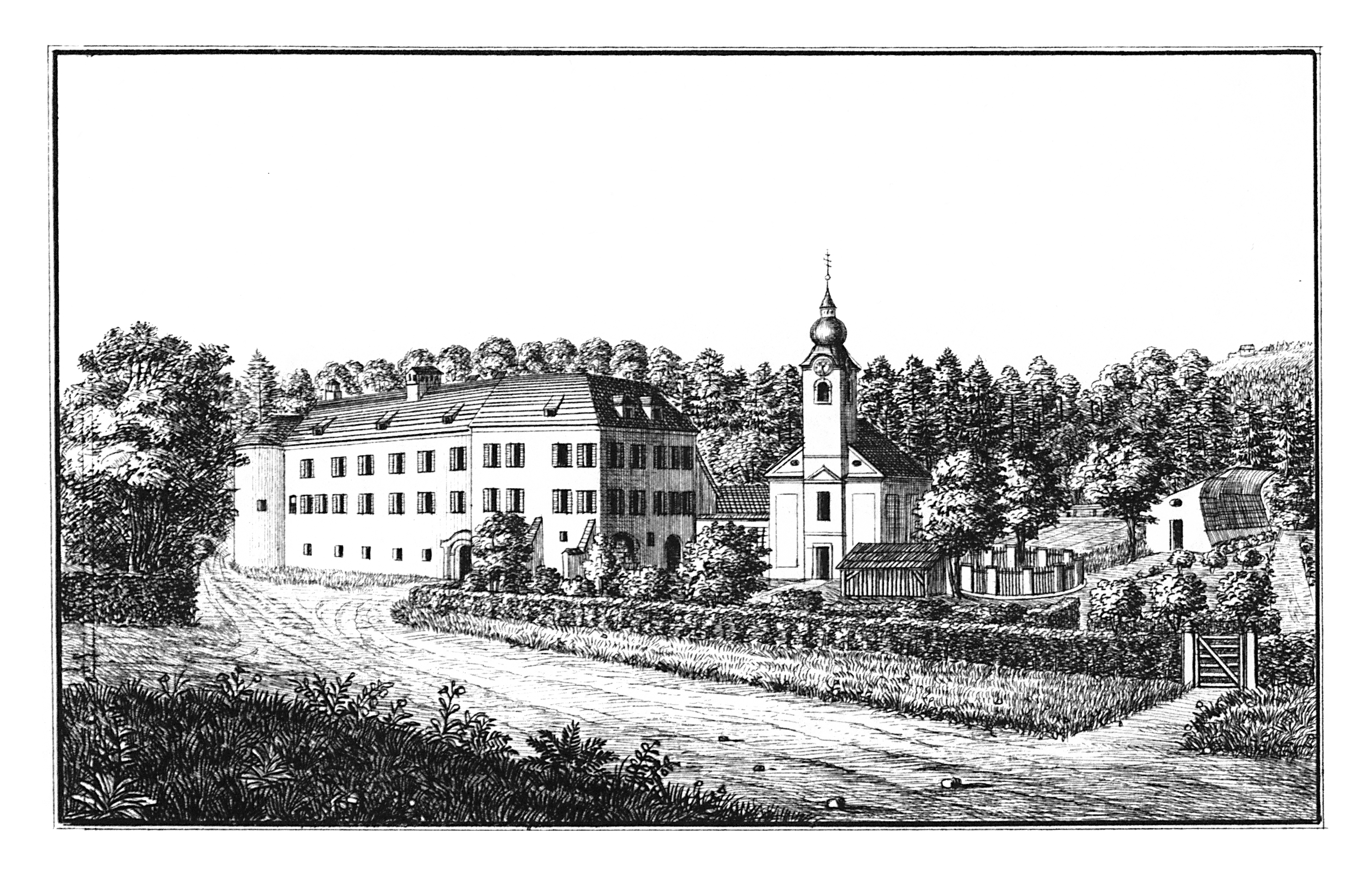
The mansion in 1830 (J. F. Kaiser)

In 1803, a decree was issued to take the three bells of the monastery church to Celje. However, the local peasants rebelled and prevented the bells from being taken. They were only taken away after the district commissioner sent 60 soldiers. Several hundred rebellious peasants, who started pelting the soldiers with stones, were fired upon and one peasant boy was killed.

The building was sold in 1805 to a private buyer, Jakob Brezic. The next owner, Josef Oesterlein, had the monastery church of Our Lady demolished and the church of St Dominic, which still stands in front of the mansion, built in 1826. Various demolitions and constructions turned the monastery complex into a mansion.

The monastery also had a small church of St Dominic dating from the mid-17th century, which was located to the north-east of the monastery on a small hill, but was left to decay after the dissolution of the monastery. The painting of the saint is kept in the parish of Šempeter. The monastery, which had been converted into a mansion, underwent a major restoration in the second half of the 19th century under the ownership of Ignatius Kurz. The building was given a two-storey link to the church and a neo-Gothic corner tower.

The building remained in private ownership until between the interwar period, when it was owned by Oto Parin. Surrounded by a park of exotic trees and ponds dating back to monastic times, he successfully managed the estate with dairy cattle, arable crops and hops. His son Paul, who spent his early years at the mansion, made a name for himself as a surgeon, psychoanalyst and writer in Switzerland. His Jewish family had moved there because of antisemitism during the occupation by Nazi Germany. He shared his memories of his youth in interviews and wove them into his books Untrügliche Zeichen von Veränderung and Karakul: Erzählungen.

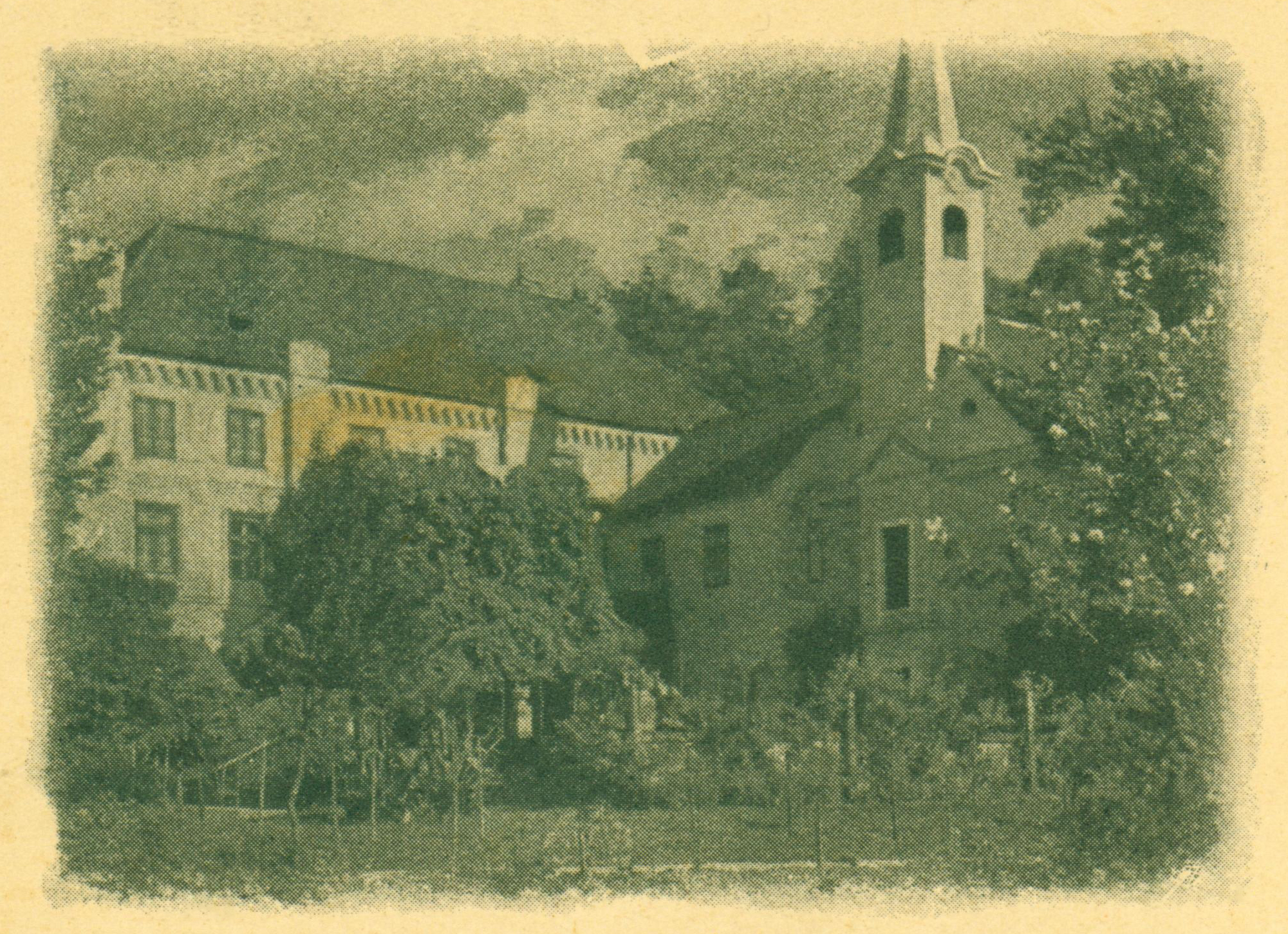
Postcard from 1936

During the World War II, the mansion was taken up by the German army and later emptied and partially burnt down in partisan reprisals. After the war, it ended up in state hands. Social housing was arranged for about 25 people, though the accommodation was poor and inadequate. In their search for work and a better life, they were shaped by a special sense of belonging.

=== Konferenčni center Polzela ===
After the Slovenian independence, the ownership of the mansion was in the hands of the Municipality of Polzela. After a minor renovation, a library was established. Various cultural activities took place, organised by Slovene-Swiss Slovica Association.

The municipality transferred last inhabitants out of the building before selling it to Zavod Tromostovje, based in Ljubljana. It bought the mansion at auction and gradually restored it in accordance with monument protection, turning it into a conference centre. Within the Polzela Conference Centre, cultural and educational activities are conducted by Društvo Dvorec.

The oldest part of the building, which is the northern part with the corner tower from the early 16th century, has been partially reconstructed. Fully renovated are the western wing from the mid-18th century, the south-western wing from the late 17th century, and the two-storey extension to the church on the south side from the 19th century. Before restoring other parts and the façade with the help of donators, the plan is to convert the attic into a mansard.

== Gallery ==
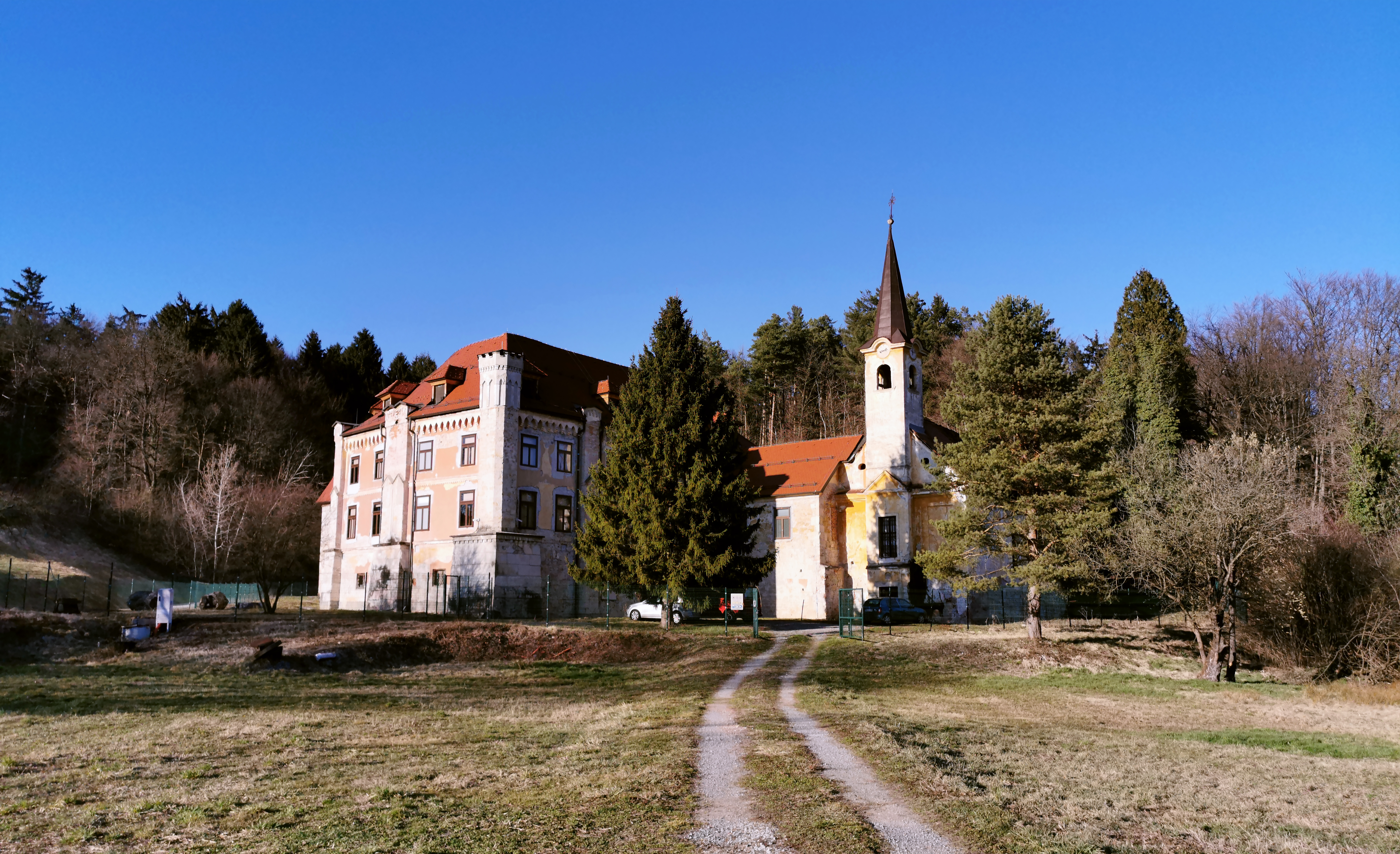

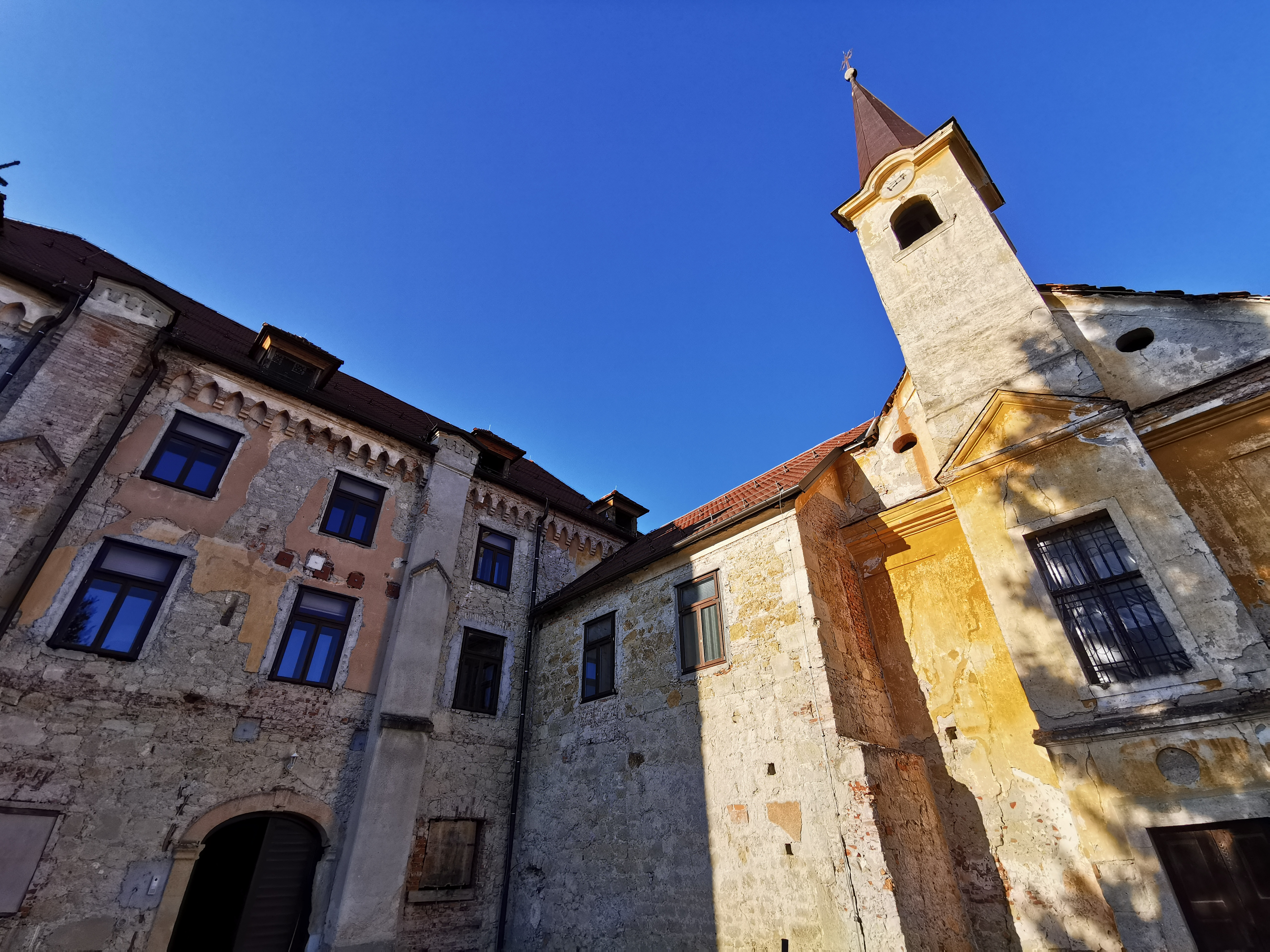

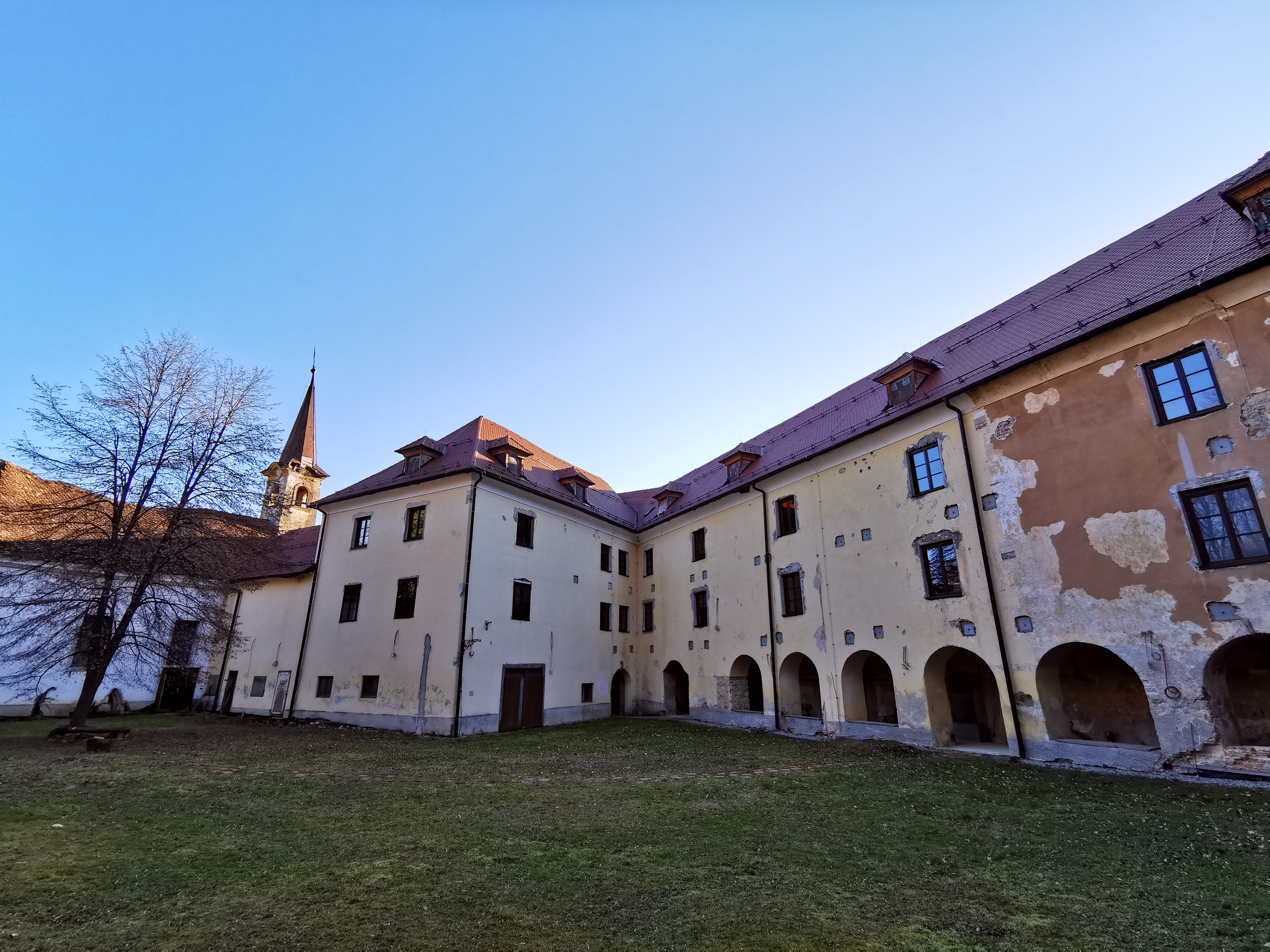

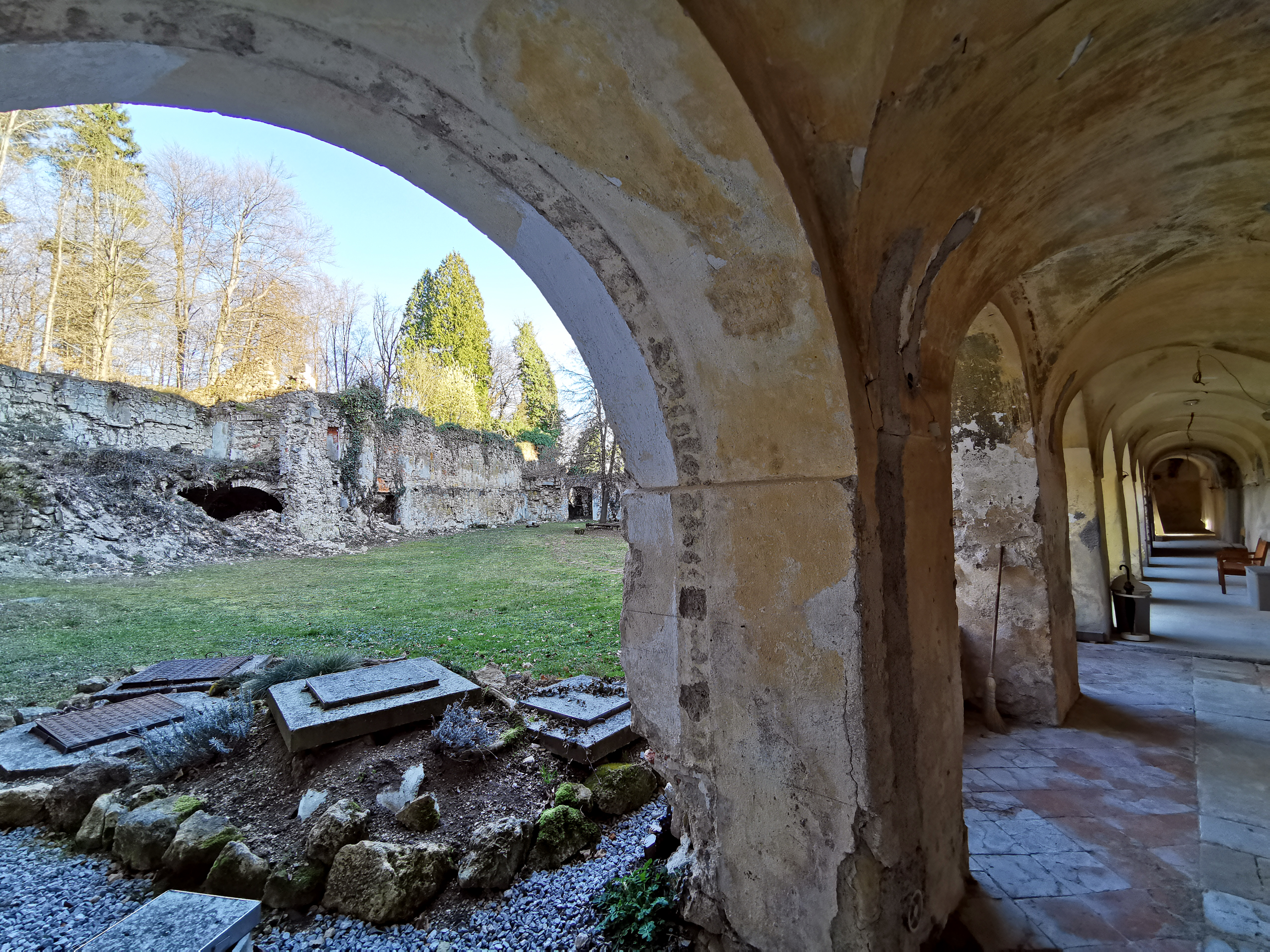

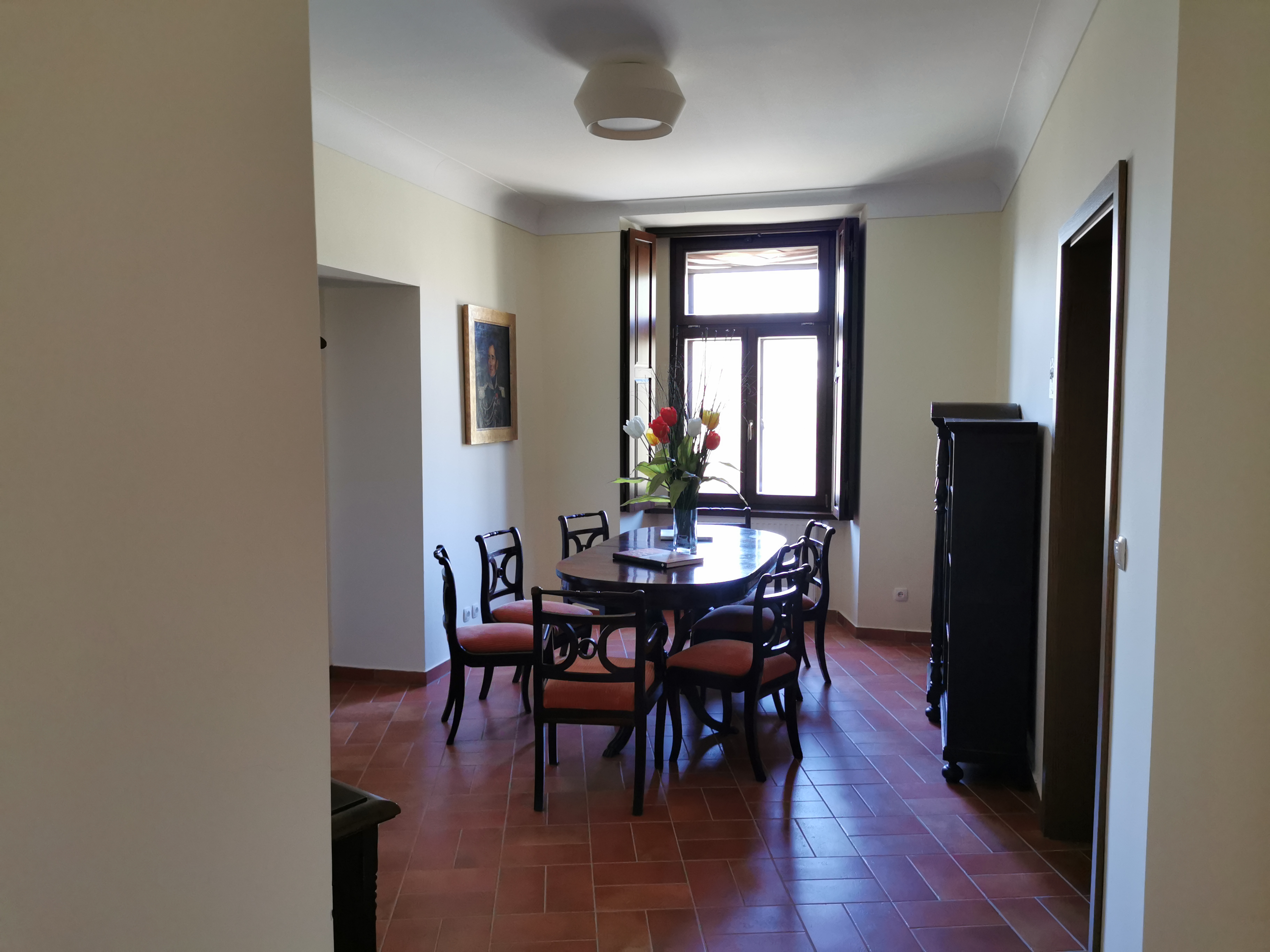

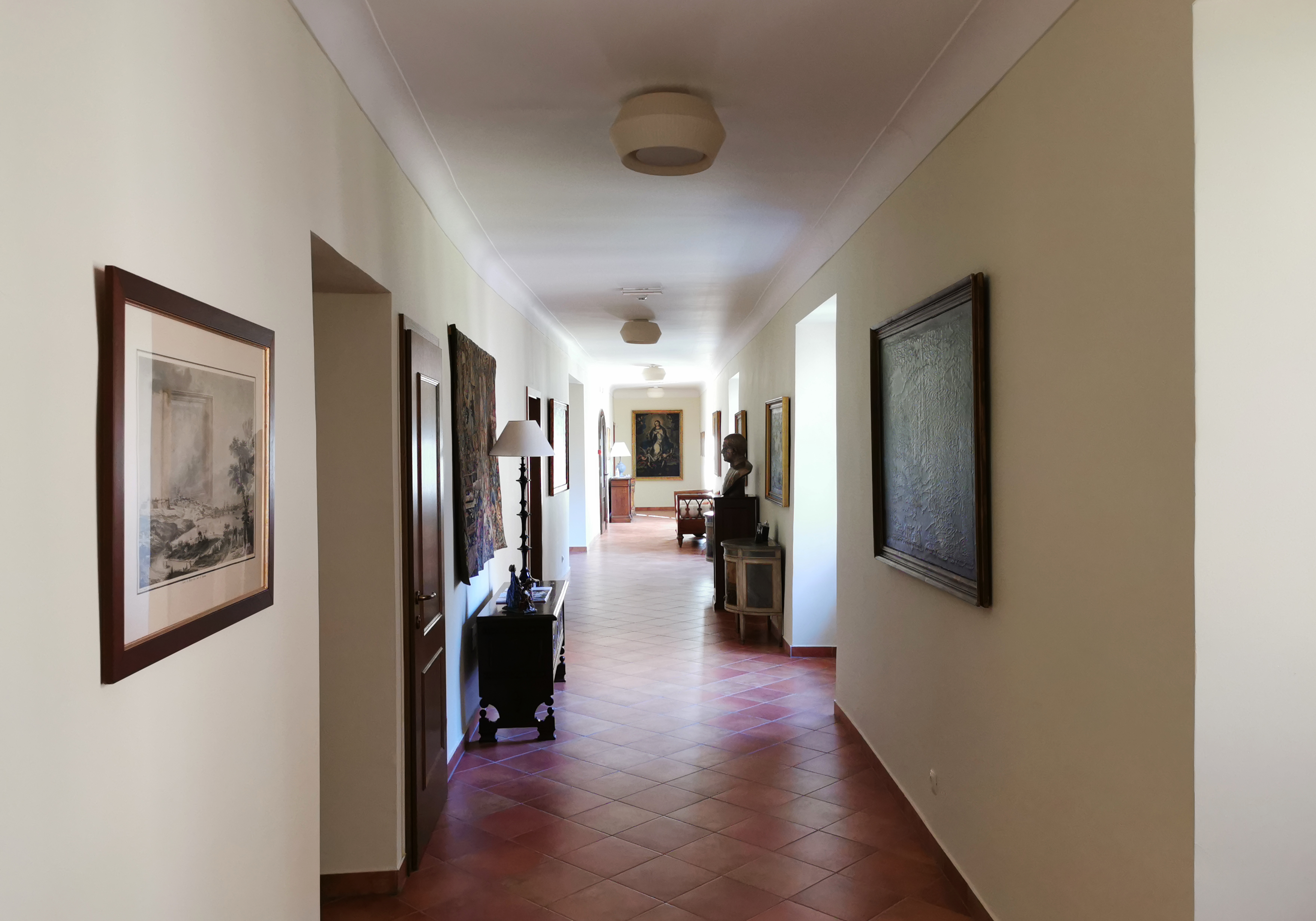

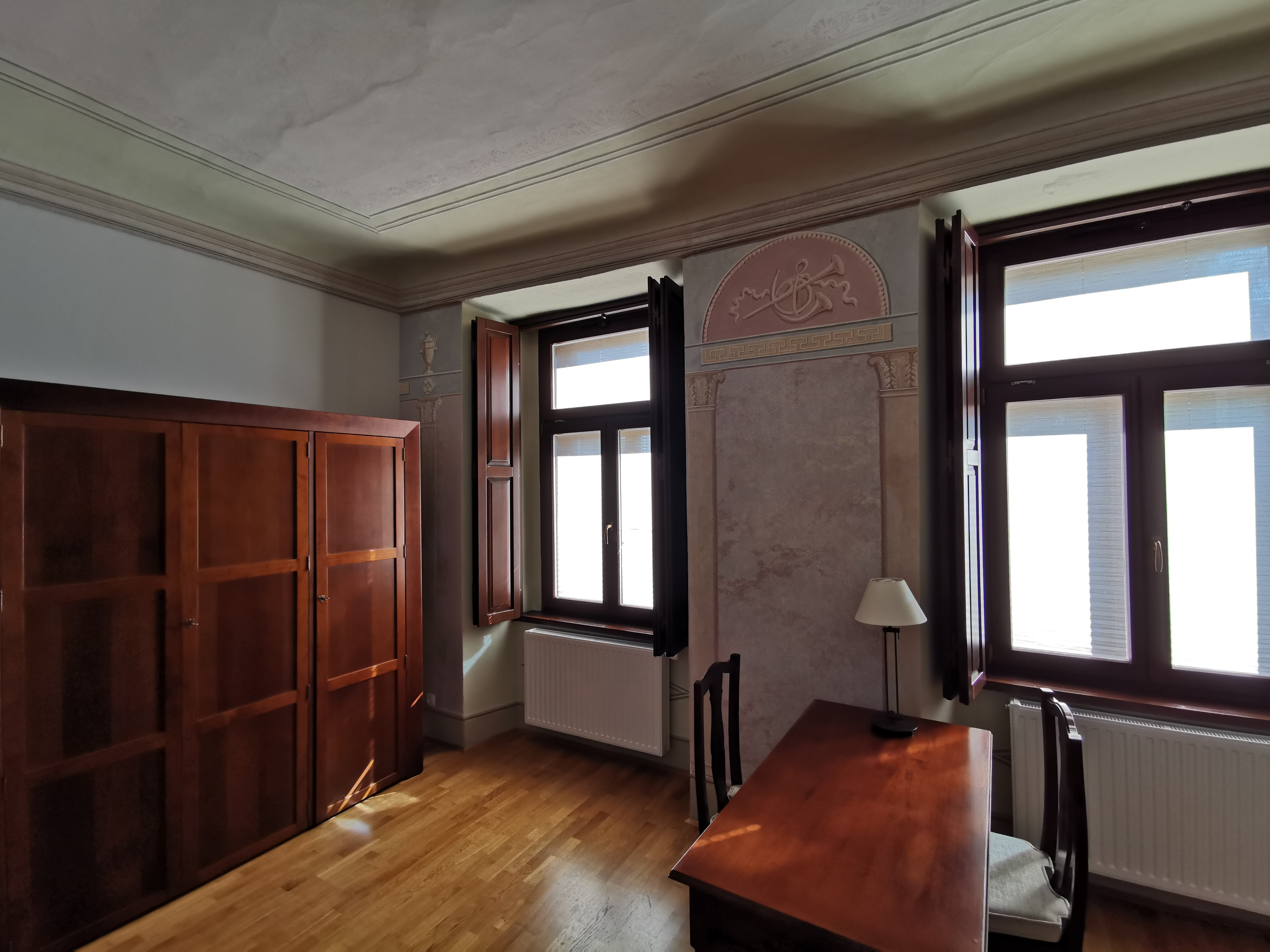

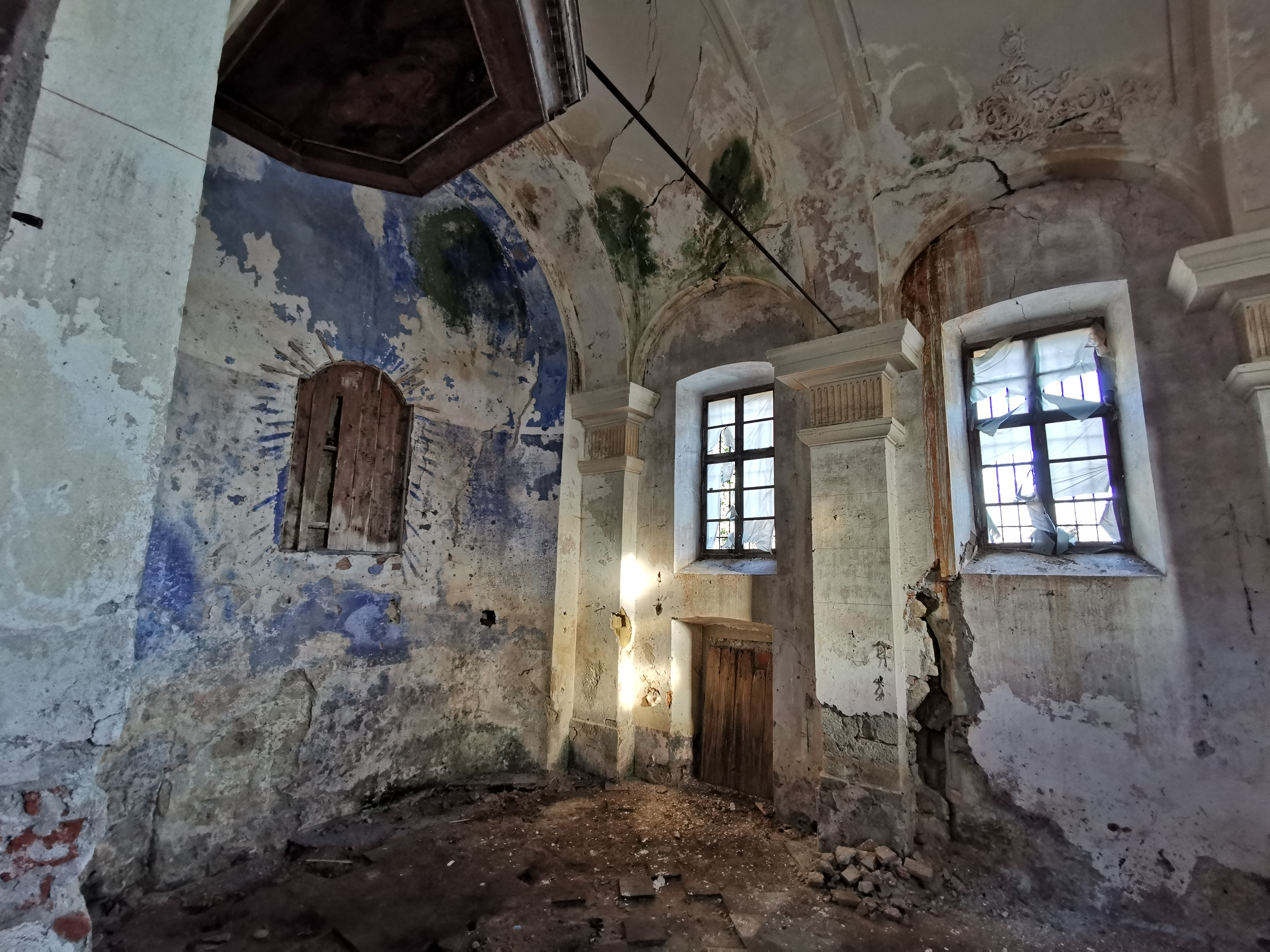

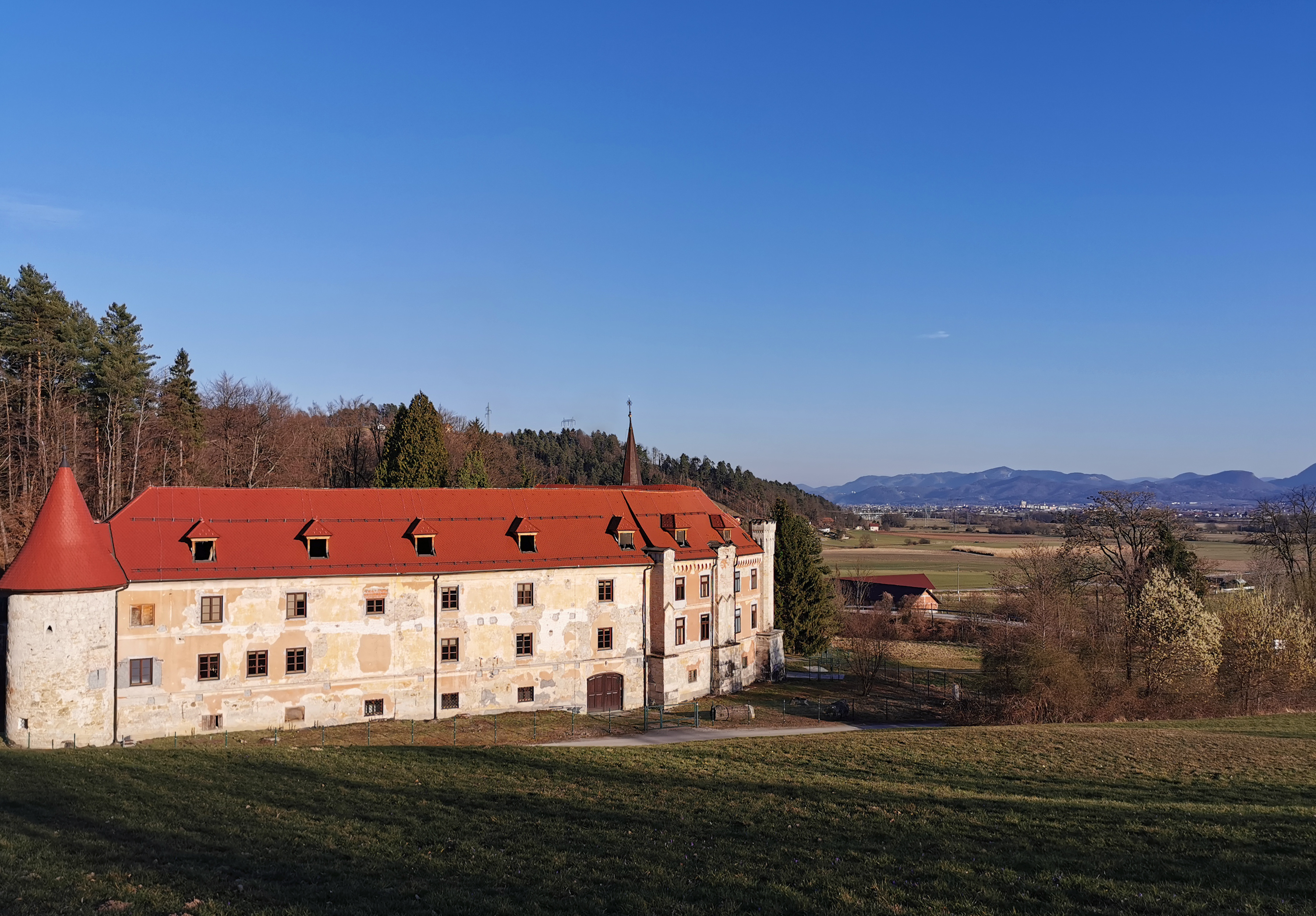

== See also ==
- Counts of Celje
- Dominican Order

== Sources ==
- Curk, Jože (1984). Gradbeni oris Novega kloštra in njegovega gospostva. Časopis za zgodovino in narodopisje (55/2): 217–225. COBISS 769284
- Kolar, Bogdan (2016). Zgodovina krščanstva na ozemlju celjske škofije. Celje: Celjska Mohorjeva družba. ISBN 978-961-278-253-5 COBISS 283767808
- Koropec, Jože (1984). Zemljiško gospostvo Novi klošter do konca 17. stoletja. Časopis za zgodovino in narodopisje (55/2): 191–216 COBISS 160639
- Kovačič, Franc (1928). Zgodovina Lavantinske škofije (1228–1928). Maribor: Lavantinski kn. šk. ordinariat. COBISS 21179393 Document in the Digital Library of Slovenia.
- Mlinarič, Jože (2009). Dominikanski samostan na Ptuju. Ptuj: Zgodovinski arhiv. Gradiva in razprave: 5. ISBN 978-961-6305-15-0 COBISS 248813568
- Orožen, Ignacij (1880). Das Bisthum und die Diözese Lavant (Lavanter Diözesan Chronik). Cilli: J. Rakusch. COBISS 30013441 Document in the Digital Library of Slovenia.
- Pukl, Valerija idr. Monografija Polzele. Polzela, Občina, 2008. COBISS 241106176
