= Neža Maurer =

Slovene poet and writer (1930–2025)

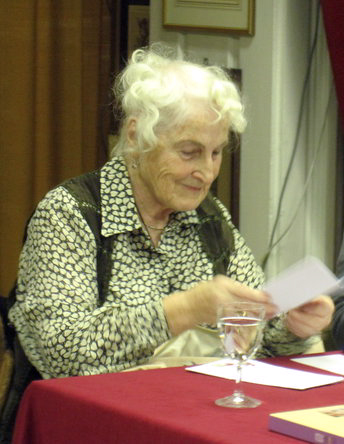
- Born: 22 December 1930; Podvin pri Polzeli, Kingdom of Yugoslavia (now in Slovenia)
- Died: 20 April 2025 (aged 94); Preddvor, Slovenia
- Occupations: Poet, writer, journalist, editor and teacher
- Writing career
- Notable awards: Poetry Gold Medal; 2010 for her life work

Neža Maurer Škofič (22 December 1930 – 20 April 2025) was a Slovene poet and writer. She wrote for children, young adults, and adults and worked as a translator, journalist, editor and teacher.

Neža Maurer was born in the village of Podvin near Polzela in 1930. She trained as a teacher in Ljubljana and taught in schools in Črni vrh nad Idrijo and Ilirska Bistrica and, at the same time, got a degree in Slavistics from the University of Ljubljana. She worked as a journalist and program coordinator for youth programs at TV Ljubljana and as a contributor and editor at numerous magazines and journals. She lived in Preddvor and, as a retired artist, continued to be a prolific writer and poet.

In 2010, she received the Poetry Gold Medal for her life's work. Maurer died on 20 April 2025, at the age of 94.

== Published works ==
=== For young adults and children ===
==== Poetry ====
- Sončne statve, 1970
- Kam pa teče voda, 1972
- Kako spi veverica, 1975
- Kostanjev škratek, 1980
- Beli muc, 1981
- Kadar Vanči riše, 1985
- Televizijski otroci, 1986
- Uh, kakšne laži, 1987
- Iskal sem kukavico, 1989
- Bratec Kratekčas, 1989
- Oče Javor, 1990
- Muca frizerka, 1995
- Kdo, 1997
- Od srede do petka, 1997
- Sloni v spačku, 1997
- Kostanjev škratek, 1997
- Velik sončen dan, 2000
- Kdo se oglaša, 2003
- Zajčkova telovadba, 2004
- Pišem, berem A, B, C, 2005

==== Prose ====
- Čukec, 1978
- Koruzni punčki, 1993
- Zvesti jazbec, 1999
- Dica Prstančica, 2001
- Ti si moje srce, 2008

=== For adults ===
==== Poetry ====
- Skorja dlani in skorja kruha, 1969
- Ogenj do zadnjega diha, 1973
- Čas, ko je vse prav, 1978
- U službi života, 1978
- Tej poti se reče želja, 1984
- Drevo spoznanja, 1987
- Kadar ljubimo, 1990
- Litanije za mir, 1991
- Od mene k tebi, 1993
- Leva stran neba, 1994
- Wenn wir lieben, 1995
- The veiled landscape, 1995
- Metulj na snegu, 1997
- Igra za življenje, 1999
- Zbrana dela I.del, 2000
- Zbrana dela II. del, 2003
- Zmenek, 2004
- Raj, 2007
- Od mene k tebi, 2007
- Na tvojo kožo pišem svoje verze, 2008
- Piramide upanja, 2010
- Sama sva na svetu – ti in jaz, 2010

==== Prose ====
- Zveza mora ostati, 1967
- Dom za telohov cvet, 1999
- Velika knjiga pravljic, 1999
