= Andraž nad Polzelo =

Andraž nad Polzelo Šent Andraž (until 1955)
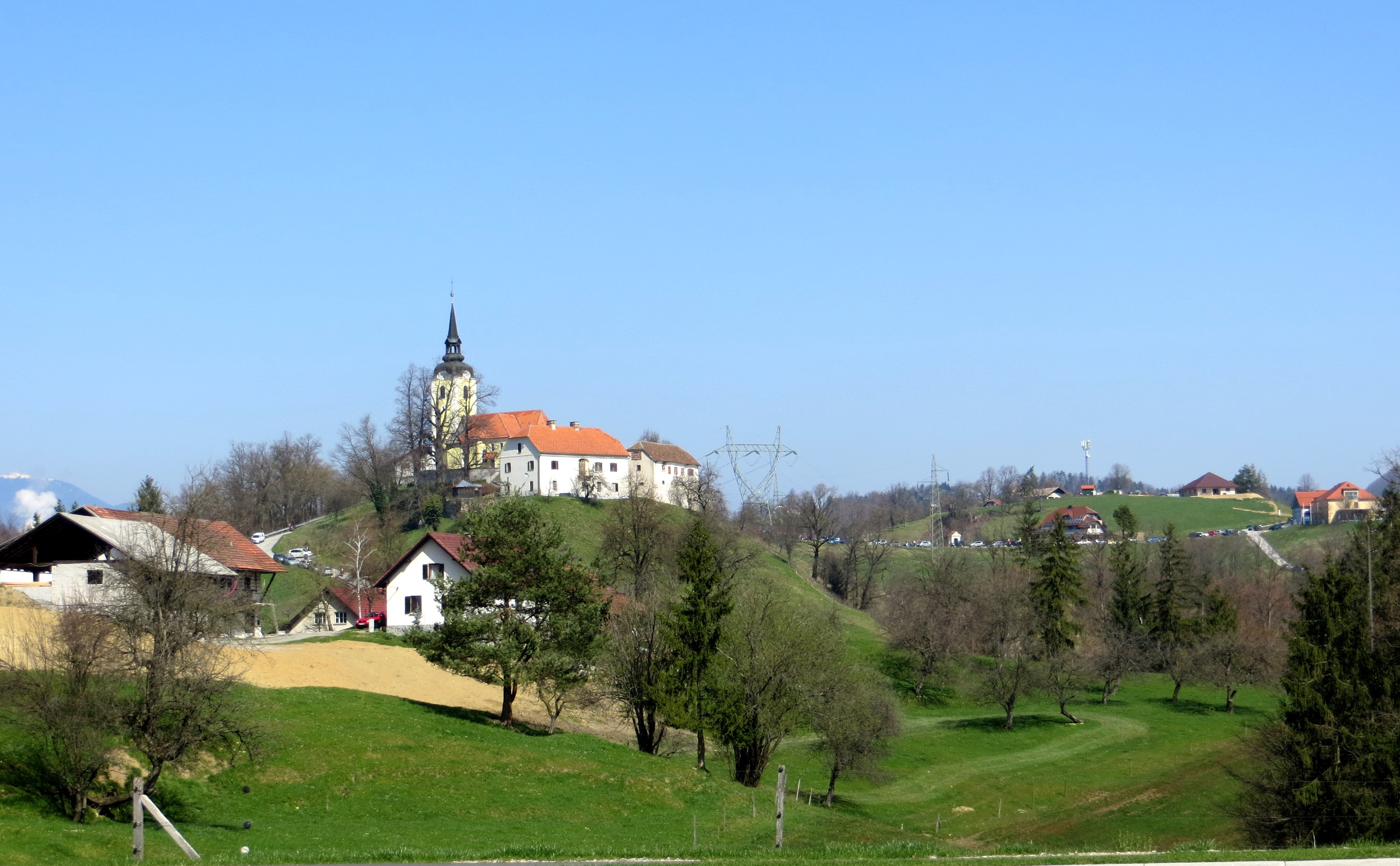

- Location in Slovenia
- Coordinates: 46°19′9.09″N 15°5′11.36″E
- Country: Slovenia
- Traditional region: Styria
- Statistical region: Savinja
- Municipality: Polzela

Area
  - Total: 11.18 km^{2} (4.32 sq mi)
- Elevation: 327.1 m (1,073 ft)

Population (2002)
  - Total: 728

Andraž nad Polzelo (pronounced [anˈdɾaːʃ nat ˈpoːu̯zɛlɔ]) is a settlement in the Municipality of Polzela in Slovenia. It lies in the Ložnica Hills north of Polzela and south of Velenje. The area is part of the traditional region of Styria. The municipality is now included in the Savinja Statistical Region.

== Name ==
The name of the settlement was changed from Šent Andraž (literally, 'Saint Andrew') to Andraž nad Polzelo (literally, 'Andrew above Polzela') in 1955. The name was changed on the basis of the 1948 Law on Names of Settlements and Designations of Squares, Streets, and Buildings as part of efforts by Slovenia's postwar communist government to remove religious elements from toponyms.

== Church ==
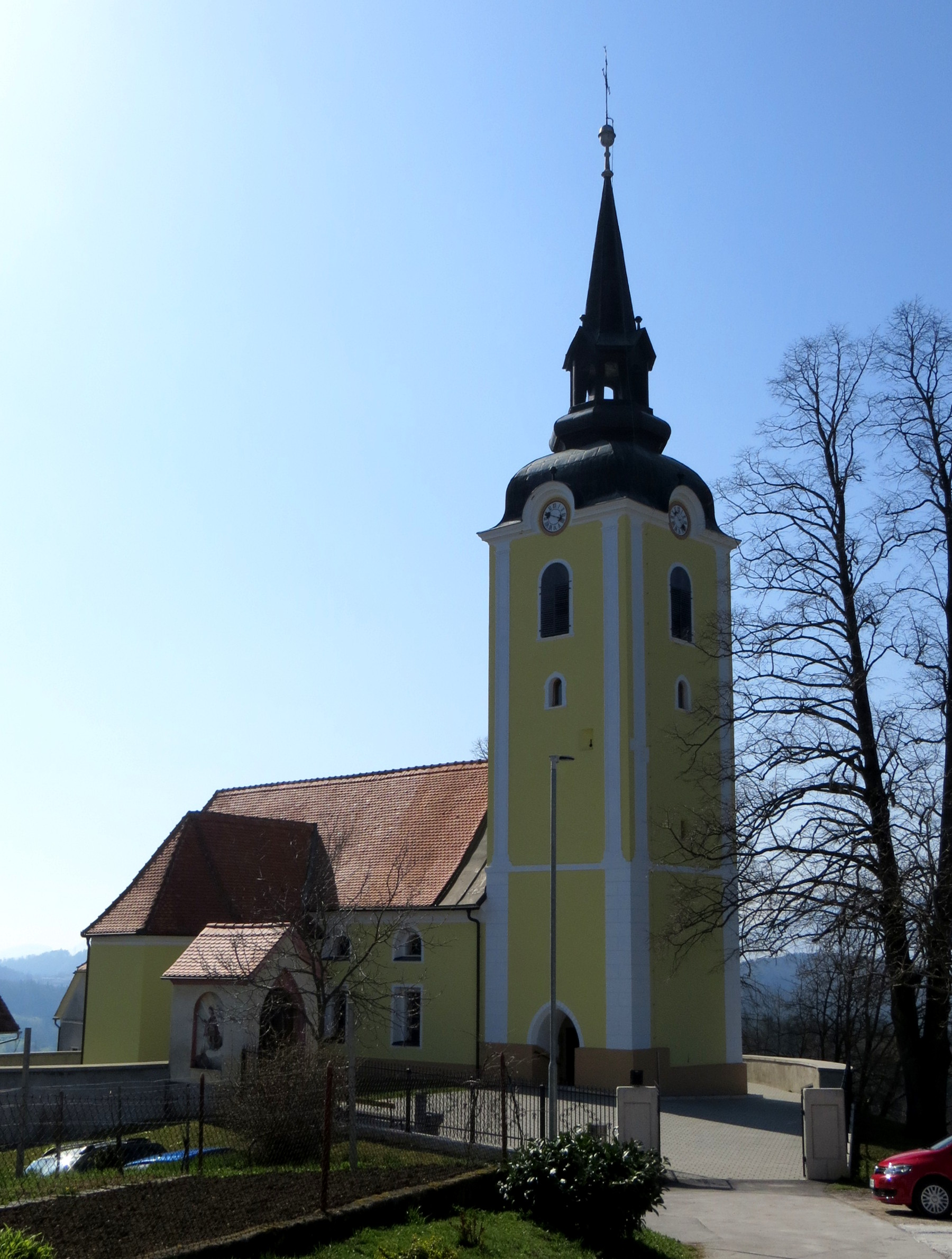
Saint Andrew's Church

The local parish church, from which the settlement gets its name, is dedicated to Saint Andrew and belongs to the Roman Catholic Diocese of Celje. It was first mentioned in written documents dating to 1229. The core of the current church is Gothic and dates to around 1400. It is built on a small hill in the middle of the settlement and it served as a protective enclosure against Ottoman raids.
