= Podvin pri Polzeli =

Podvin pri Polzeli Podvin Vranski (1952–1963)
- Location in Slovenia
- Coordinates: 46°18′1.46″N 15°3′35.45″E
- Country: Slovenia
- Traditional region: Styria
- Statistical region: Savinja
- Municipality: Polzela

Area
  - Total: 2.8 km^{2} (1.1 sq mi)
- Elevation: 399.7 m (1,311 ft)

Population (2002)
  - Total: 235

Podvin pri Polzeli (pronounced [pɔˈdʋiːm pɾi ˈpoːu̯zɛli]; German: Podwin) is a settlement on the left bank of the Savinja River in the Municipality of Polzela in Slovenia. The area is part of the traditional region of Styria. The municipality is now included in the Savinja Statistical Region.

== Name ==
The name of the settlement was changed from Podvin to Podvin Vranski in 1952. It was changed again from Podvin Vranski to Podvin pri Polzeli in 1963.

== Church ==
The local church, built on Vimperk Hill south of the settlement, is dedicated to Saint Nicholas and belongs to the Parish of Polzela. It is a Gothic church that was greatly rebuilt in the 18th century.

== Notable people ==
Notable people that were born or lived in Podvin pri Polzeli include:

- Neža Maurer (1930–), poet and journalist
