= Orova Vas =

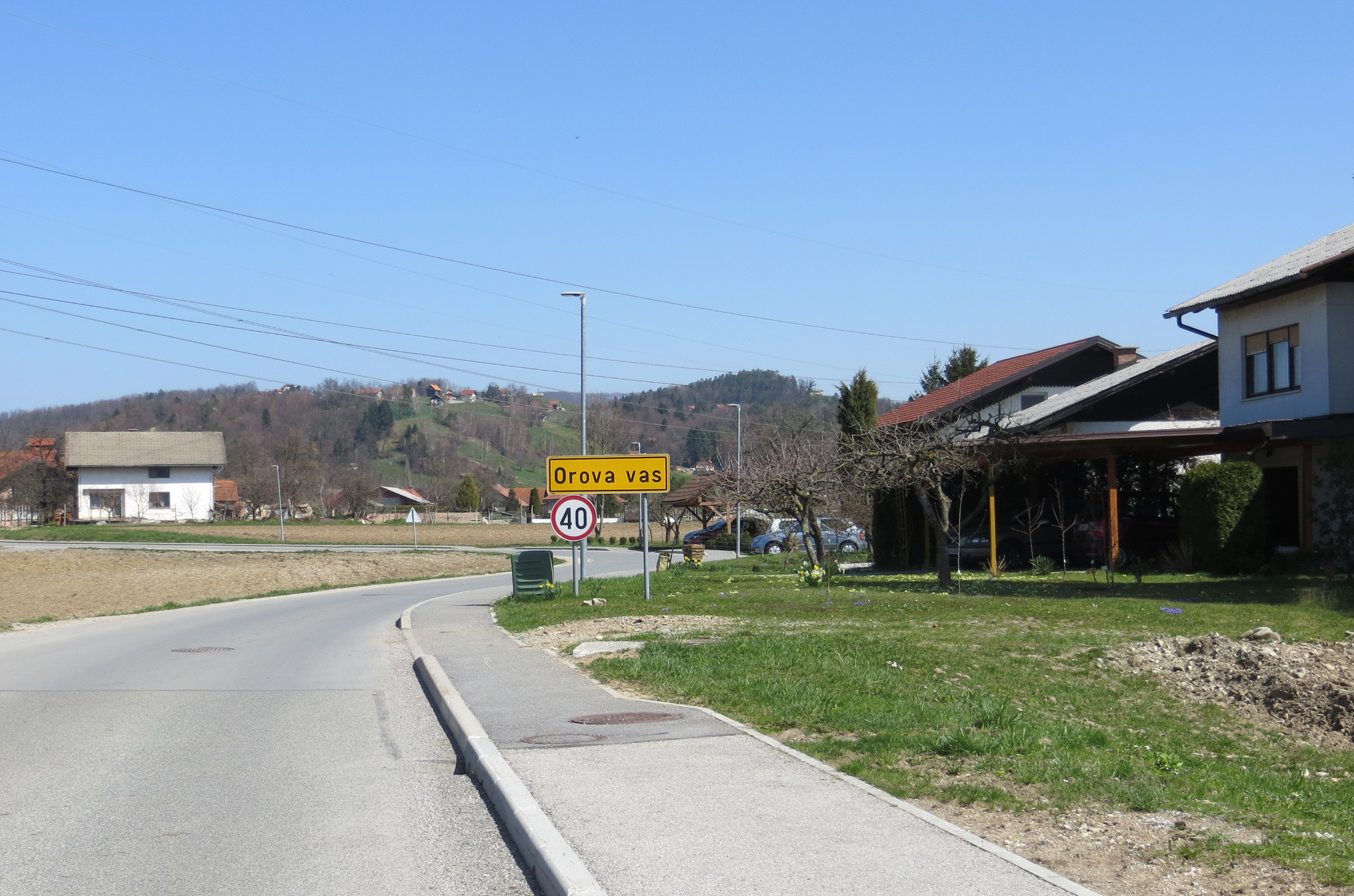

- Location in Slovenia
- Coordinates: 46°16′47.87″N 15°5′14.41″E
- Country: Slovenia
- Traditional region: Styria
- Statistical region: Savinja
- Municipality: Polzela

Area
  - Total: 1.45 km^{2} (0.56 sq mi)
- Elevation: 286.2 m (939 ft)

Population (2002)
  - Total: 98

Orova Vas (pronounced [ɔˈɾɔːʋa ˈʋaːs] or [ɔˈɾoːʋa ˈʋaːs]; Slovene: Orova vas; German: Pfaffendorf) is a small village settlement in the Municipality of Polzela in eastern Slovenia. The area is part of the traditional region of Styria. As part of the Municipality of Polzela, it is now included in the Savinja Statistical Region.
