= Založe =

- Location in Slovenia
- Coordinates: 46°17′25.12″N 15°6′25.39″E
- Country: Slovenia
- Traditional region: Styria
- Statistical region: Savinja
- Municipality: Polzela

Area
  - Total: 5.77 km^{2} (2.23 sq mi)
- Elevation: 371.5 m (1,219 ft)

Population (2002)
  - Total: 363

Založe (pronounced [ˈzaːlɔʒɛ], German: Sallosche) is a settlement in the Municipality of Polzela in Slovenia. The area is part of the traditional region of Styria. The municipality is now included in the Savinja Statistical Region.

The Novi Klošter Monastery is a 15th-century monastery in the southeast of the settlement. It was built by Frederick II, Count of Celje. It was dissolved in 1787 and converted into a mansion in the 19th century. The complex now serves as a conference center.
