= Breg pri Polzeli =

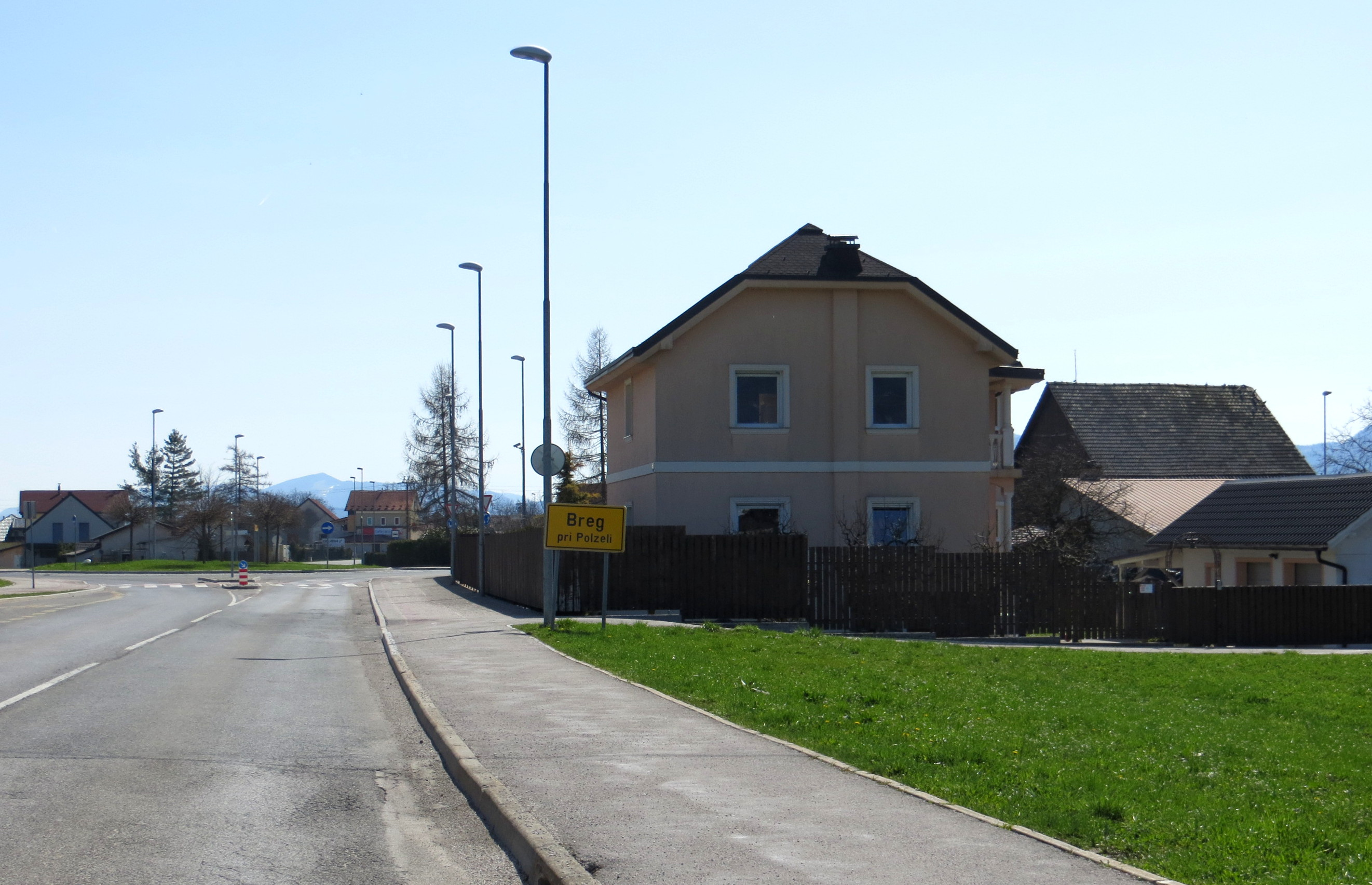

- Location in Slovenia
- Coordinates: 46°16′21.95″N 15°5′21.37″E
- Country: Slovenia
- Traditional region: Styria
- Statistical region: Savinja
- Municipality: Polzela

Area
  - Total: 1.32 km^{2} (0.51 sq mi)
- Elevation: 282.8 m (928 ft)

Population (2002)
  - Total: 805

Breg pri Polzeli (pronounced [ˈbɾeːk pɾi ˈpoːu̯zɛli]; German: Wreg) is a settlement in the Municipality of Polzela in Slovenia. It lies on the left bank of the Savinja River southeast of Polzela. The area is part of the traditional region of Styria. The municipality is now included in the Savinja Statistical Region.

== Name ==
The name of the settlement was changed from Breg to Breg pri Polzeli in 1953.

== Cultural heritage ==
A small roadside chapel in the settlement dates to 1925.
