= Ločica ob Savinji =

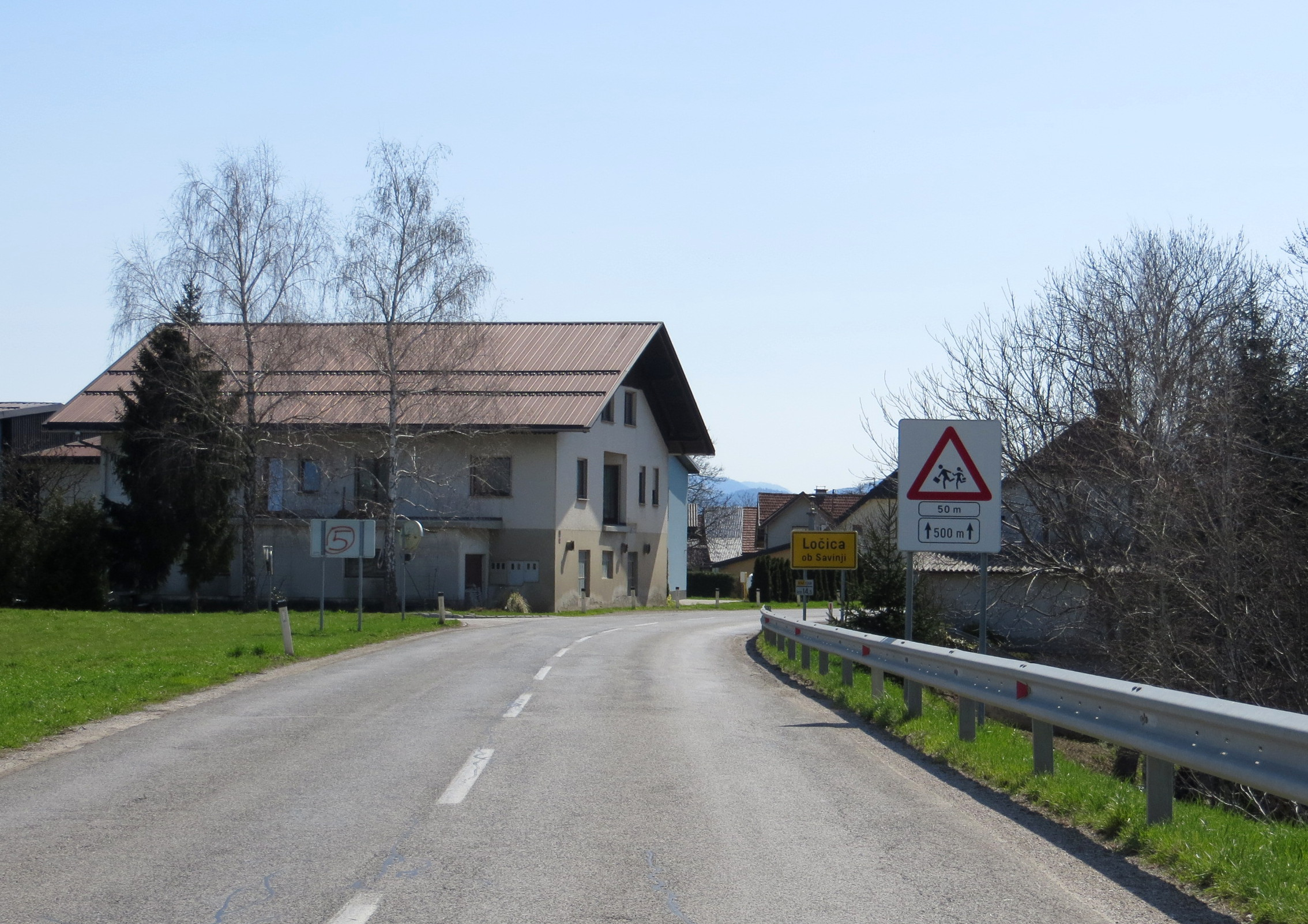

- Location in Slovenia
- Coordinates: 46°15′49.21″N 15°5′58.68″E
- Country: Slovenia
- Traditional region: Styria
- Statistical region: Savinja
- Municipality: Polzela

Area
  - Total: 1.56 km^{2} (0.60 sq mi)
- Elevation: 276.3 m (906 ft)

Population (2002)
  - Total: 653

Ločica ob Savinji (pronounced [lɔˈtʃiːtsa ɔp saˈʋiːnji]; German: Lotschitz) is a settlement on the left bank of the Savinja River in the Municipality of Polzela in Slovenia. The area is part of the traditional region of Styria. The municipality is now included in the Savinja Statistical Region.

== Name ==
The name of the settlement was changed from Ločica to Ločica ob Savinji in 1953.

== Cultural heritage ==
An archaeological site in the settlement has revealed remains of a Roman military encampment dating to the Marcomannic Wars in the late 2nd century AD.
