= Dobrič, Polzela =

Dobrič
- Location in Slovenia
- Coordinates: 46°19′9.46″N 15°4′11.99″E
- Country: Slovenia
- Traditional region: Styria
- Statistical region: Savinja
- Municipality: Polzela

Area
  - Total: 6.23 km^{2} (2.41 sq mi)
- Elevation: 358.2 m (1,175 ft)

Population (2002)
  - Total: 160

Dobrič (pronounced [dɔˈbɾiːtʃ]) is a settlement in the Municipality of Polzela in Slovenia. It lies in the Ložnica Hills (Slovene: Ložničko gričevje) north of Polzela and south of Velenje. The area is part of the traditional region of Styria. The municipality is now included in the Savinja Statistical Region.

== Mount Oljka ==
=== Church ===
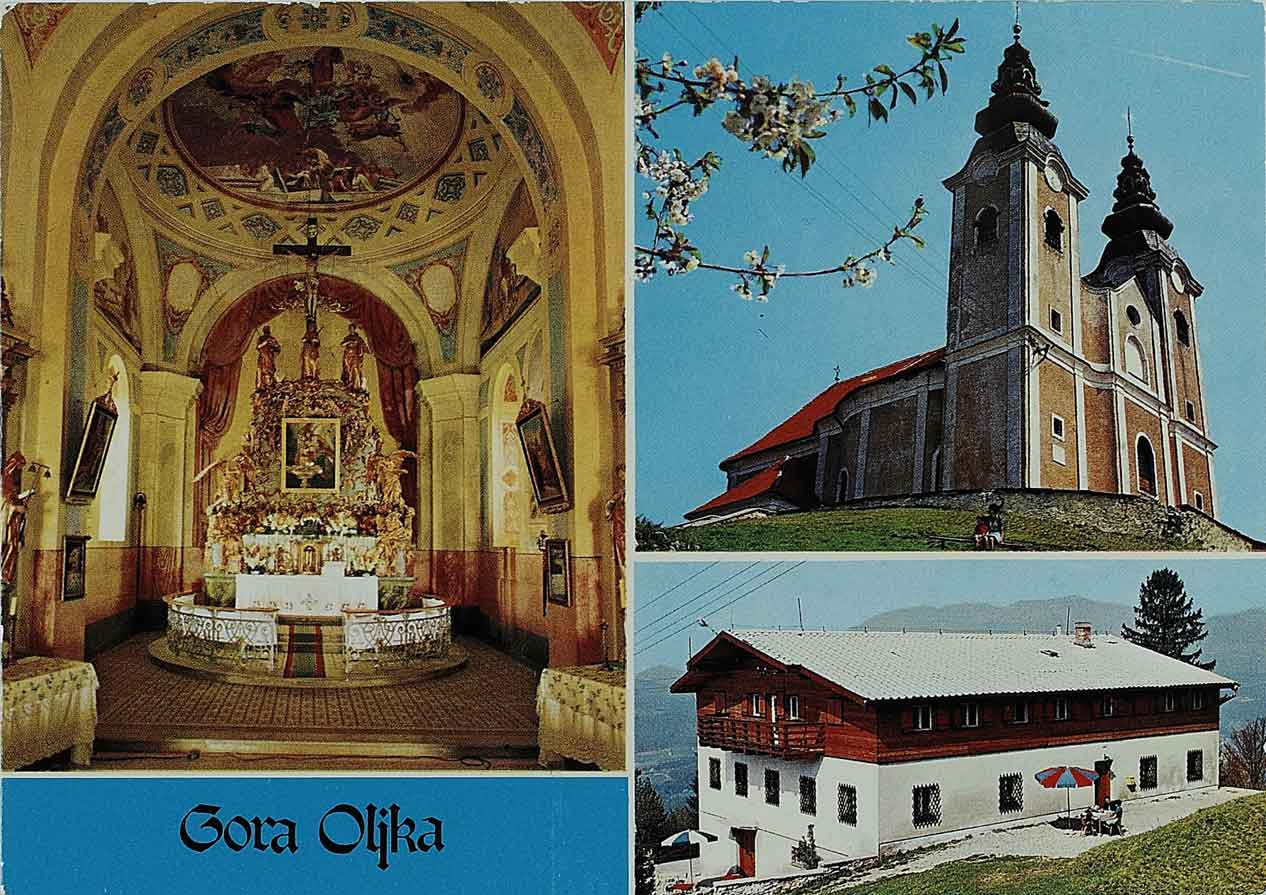
1969 postcard of Mount Oljka

The local church, built on top of Mount Oljka west of the settlement, is dedicated to the Holy Cross and belongs to the parish of Polzela. It was built between 1754 and 1757 and has a triple nave with a double belfry.
