= Municipality of Polzela =

Municipality of Slovenia

Municipality of Polzela Občina Polzela
- Municipality
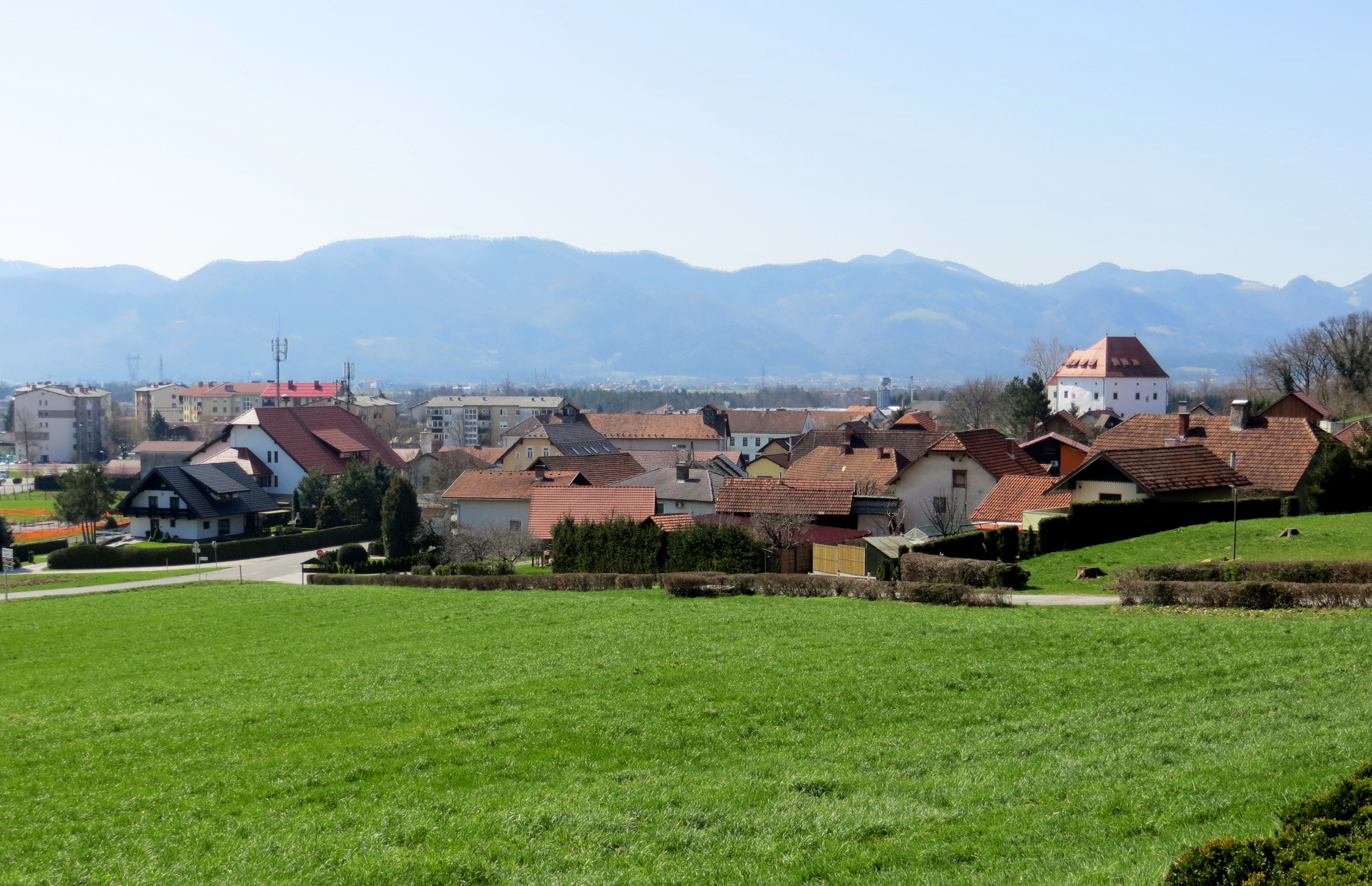

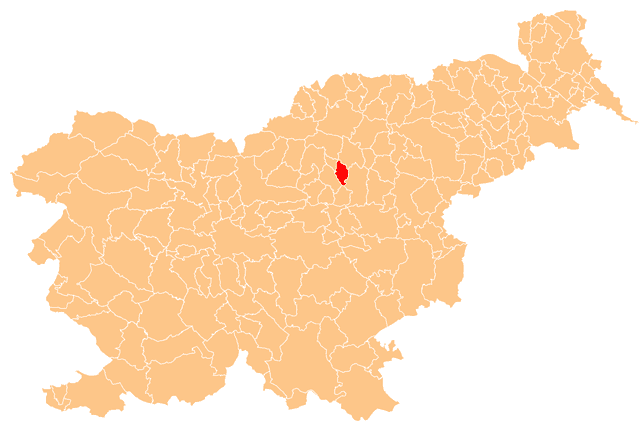
- Location of the Municipality of Polzela in Slovenia
- Coordinates: 46°17′N 15°04′E
- Country: Slovenia

Government
  - Mayor: Jože Kužnik (SDS)

Area
  - Total: 34.0 km^{2} (13.1 sq mi)

Population (July 1, 2018)
  - Total: 6,196
  - Density: 182/km^{2} (472/sq mi)
- Time zone: UTC+01 (CET)
  - Summer (DST): UTC+02 (CEST)
- Website: www.polzela.si

The Municipality of Polzela (pronounced [ˈpoːu̯zɛla]; Slovene: Občina Polzela) is a municipality in the traditional region of Styria in northeastern Slovenia. The seat of the municipality is the town of Polzela. Polzela became a municipality in 1998.

== Settlements ==
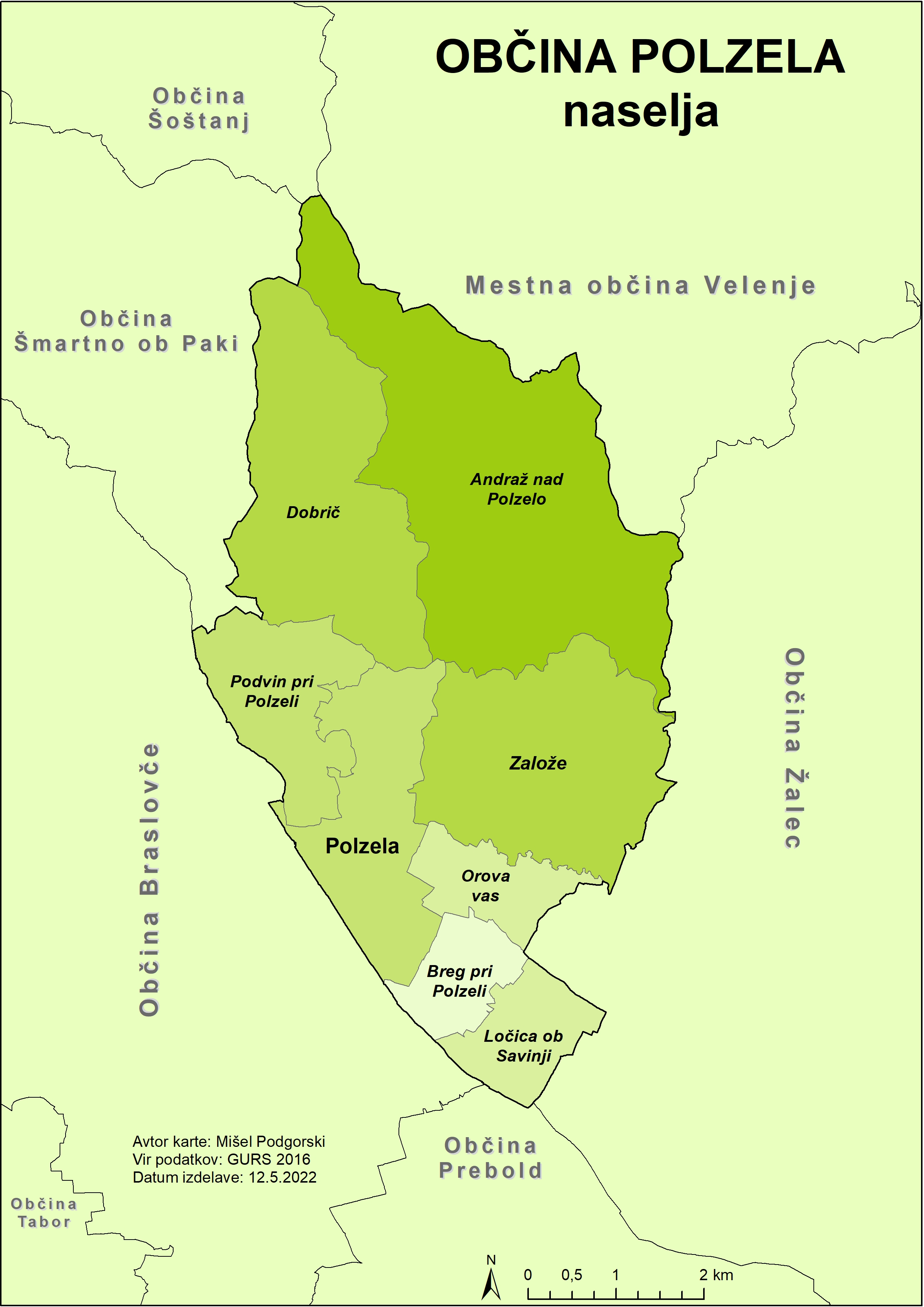
Villages in the municipality

In addition to the municipal seat of Polzela, the municipality also includes the following settlements:

- Andraž nad Polzelo
- Breg pri Polzeli
- Dobrič
- Ločica ob Savinji
- Orova Vas
- Podvin pri Polzeli
- Založe
