= Polzela =

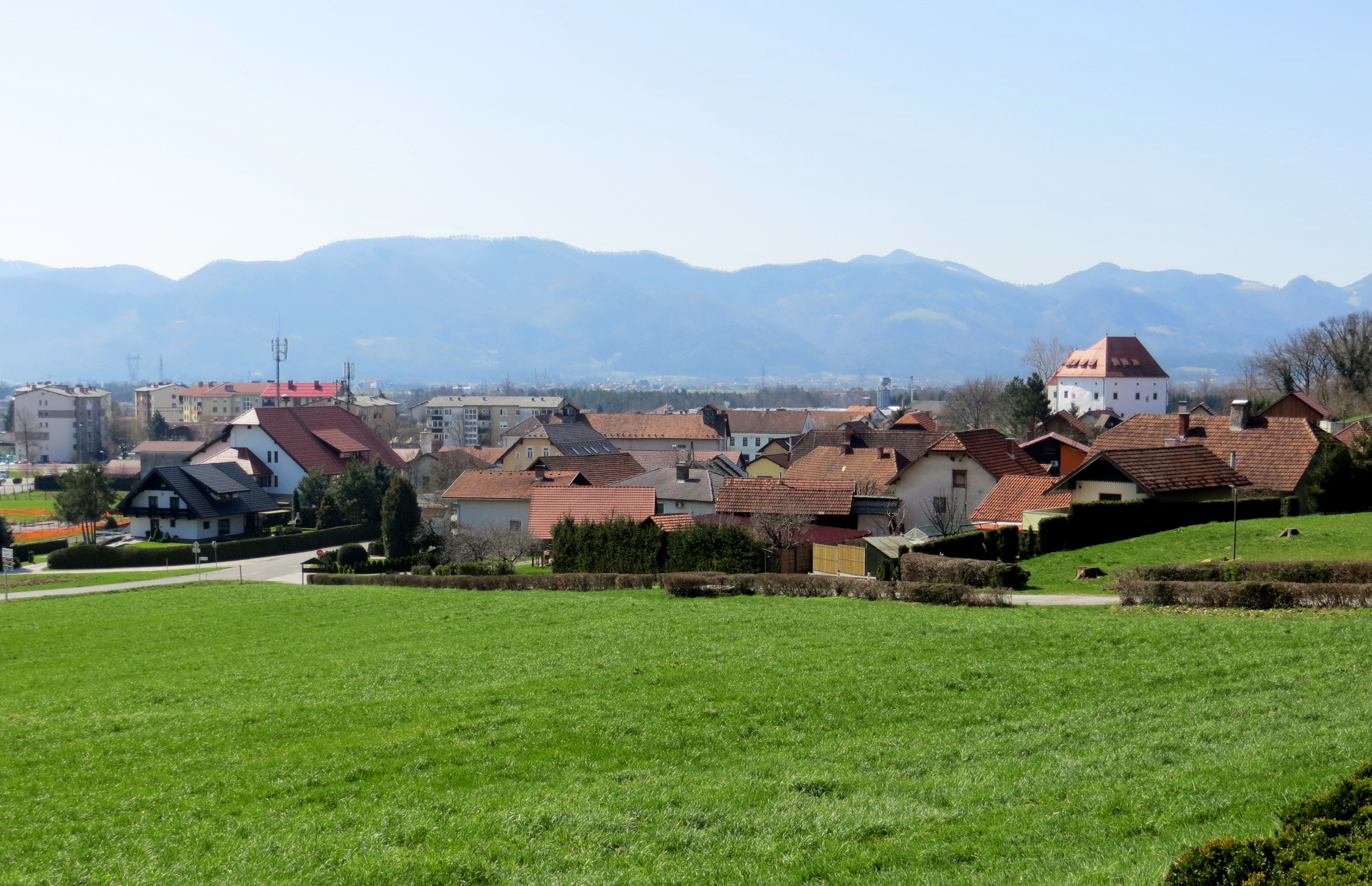

- Location in Slovenia
- Coordinates: 46°16′51.15″N 15°4′26.29″E
- Country: Slovenia
- Traditional region: Styria
- Statistical region: Savinja
- Municipality: Polzela

Area
  - Total: 3.70 km^{2} (1.43 sq mi)
- Elevation: 292.5 m (960 ft)

Population (2019)
  - Total: 2,351

Polzela (pronounced [ˈpoːu̯zɛla]; German: Heilenstein) is a settlement in Slovenia. It is the seat of the Municipality of Polzela. It lies on the left bank of the Savinja River extending into the Ložnica Hills (Slovene: Ložniško gričevje) to the north. The area is part of the traditional region of Styria. It is now included in the Savinja Statistical Region.

== Buildings ==
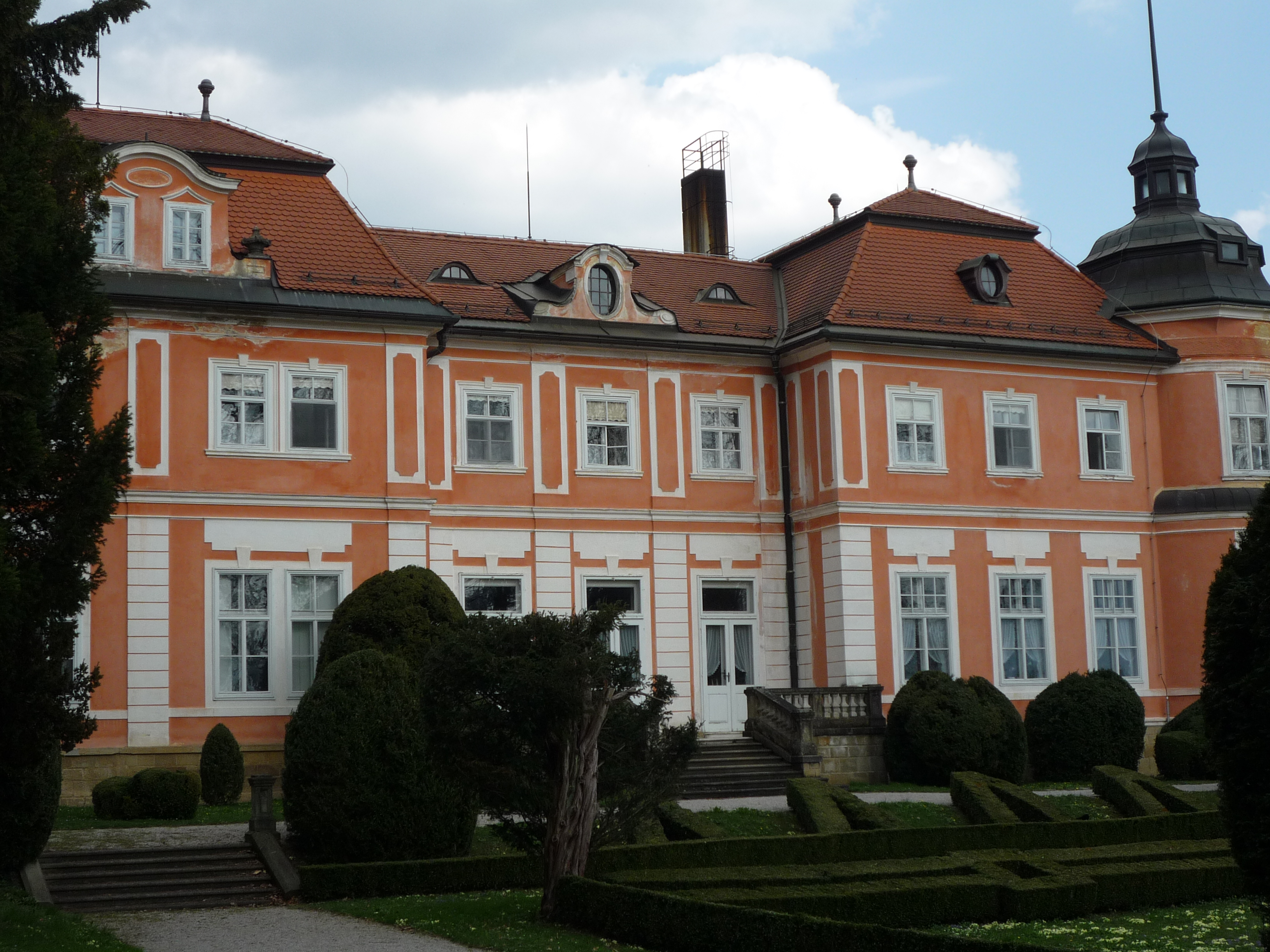
Šenek Mansion

On a hill in the centre of the settlement is Komenda Castle, a 13th-century castle used in later centuries by the Knights Hospitaller and greatly rebuilt in the 19th century. A marble lion found at the castle and the Hospitallers' Maltese cross appear in the municipal coat of arms. A Late Baroque mansion dating to the late 18th century known as Šenek Mansion with a chapel dedicated to Saint Florian and its surrounding park to the northeast of the settlement is one of the municipality's major landmarks. The parish church in the settlement is dedicated to Saint Margaret (Slovene: Sveta Marjeta) and belongs to the Roman Catholic Diocese of Celje. It was first mentioned in written documents dating to the 13th century and the core of its nave is still the original Romanesque building with 18th-century extensions and a 15th-century belfry.

== Notable people ==
Notable people that were born or lived in Polzela include the following:

- Pankracij Gregorc (1867–1920), poet and writer, lived in Polzela in 1892
- Alojz Kunst (1890–1970), radiologist
- Viljem Kunst (1904–1973), writer
- Anton Lipovšek (1799–1865), journalist
- Franc Lekše (1862–1928), author of texts on linguistic, literary history, and local history
- Pavel Strmšek (1891–1965), Slavic scholar and historian
- Vili Vybihal (1927–2010), agronomist and editor
