= Municipality of Žalec =

Municipality of Slovenia

Municipality of Žalec Občina Žalec
- Municipality
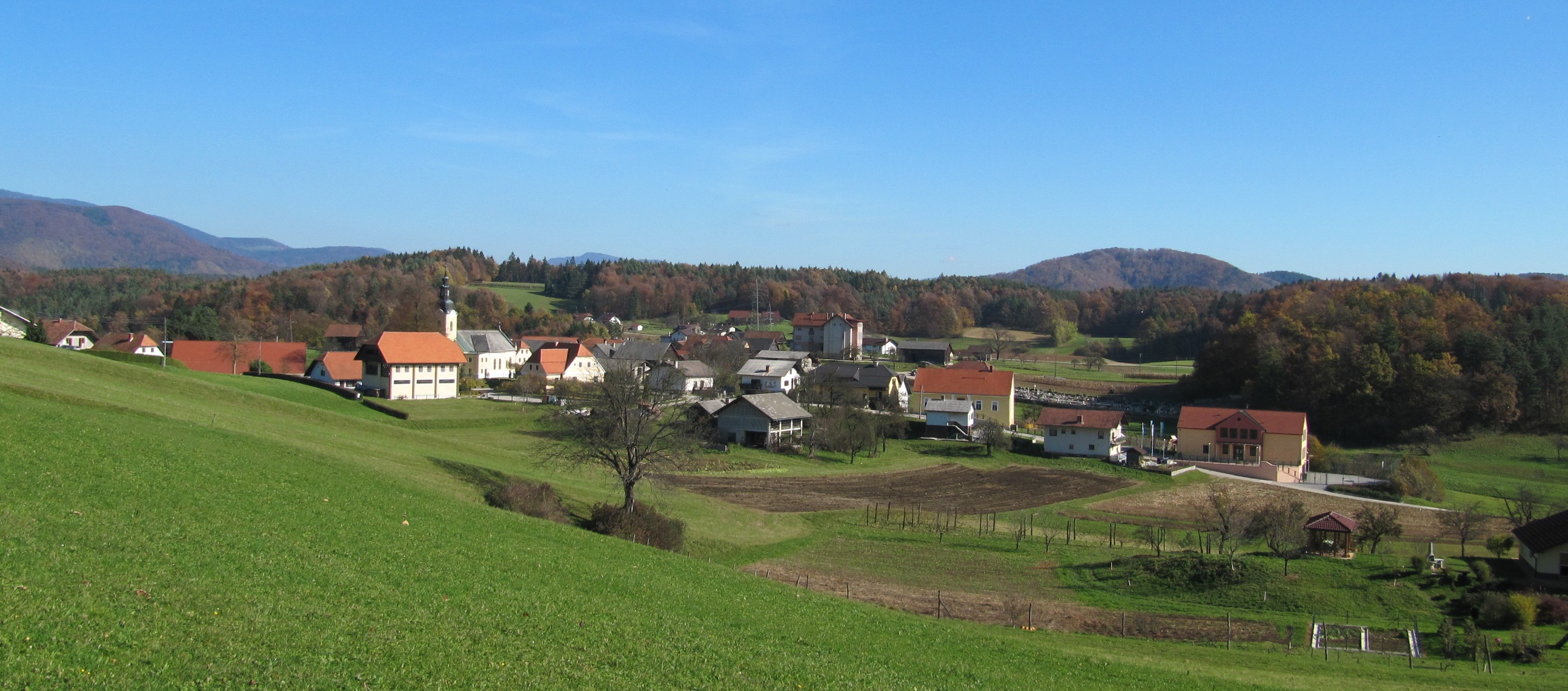

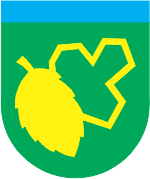
- Coat of arms

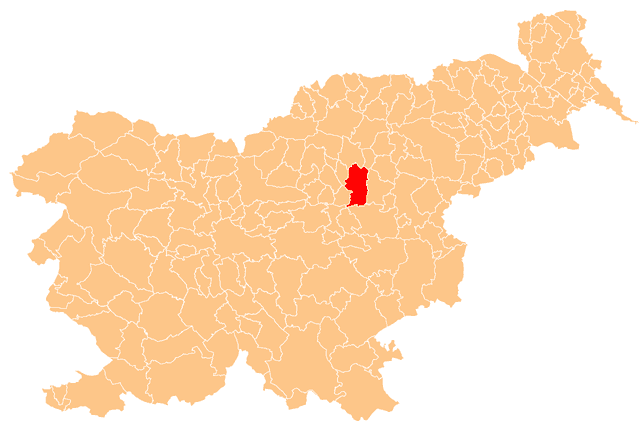
- Location of the Municipality of Žalec in Slovenia
- Coordinates: 46°15′40″N 15°9′40″E
- Country: Slovenia

Government
  - Mayor: Janko Kos

Area
  - Total: 117.1 km^{2} (45.2 sq mi)

Population (2002)
  - Total: 20,335
  - Density: 173.7/km^{2} (449.8/sq mi)
- Time zone: UTC+01 (CET)
  - Summer (DST): UTC+02 (CEST)
- Website: www.zalec.si

The Municipality of Žalec (pronounced [ˈʒaːləts]; Slovene: Občina Žalec) is a municipality in Slovenia in the traditional region of Styria. The seat of the municipality is the town of Žalec. The municipality was established in its current form on 7 August 1998, when the former larger municipality of Žalec was divided into six smaller municipalities.

== Settlements ==
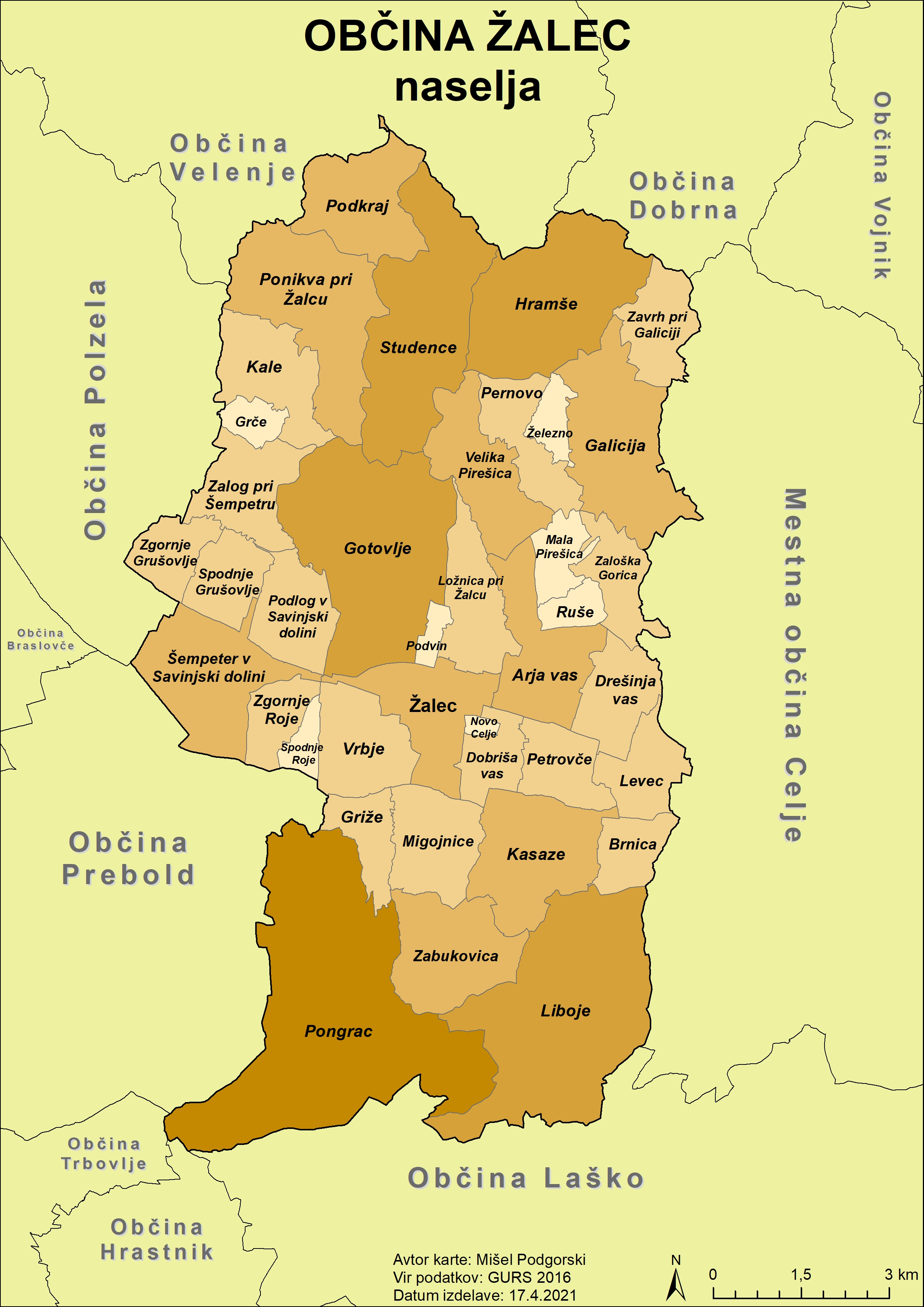
Villages in the municipality

In addition to the municipal seat of Žalec, the municipality also includes the following settlements:

- Arja Vas
- Brnica
- Dobriša Vas
- Drešinja Vas
- Galicija
- Gotovlje
- Grče
- Griže
- Hramše
- Kale
- Kasaze
- Levec
- Liboje
- Ložnica pri Žalcu
- Mala Pirešica
- Migojnice
- Novo Celje
- Pernovo
- Petrovče
- Podkraj
- Podlog v Savinjski Dolini
- Podvin
- Pongrac
- Ponikva pri Žalcu
- Ruše
- Šempeter v Savinjski Dolini
- Spodnje Grušovlje
- Spodnje Roje
- Studence
- Velika Pirešica
- Vrbje
- Zabukovica
- Zalog pri Šempetru
- Zaloška Gorica
- Zavrh pri Galiciji
- Železno
- Zgornje Grušovlje
- Zgornje Roje
