= Velika Pirešica =

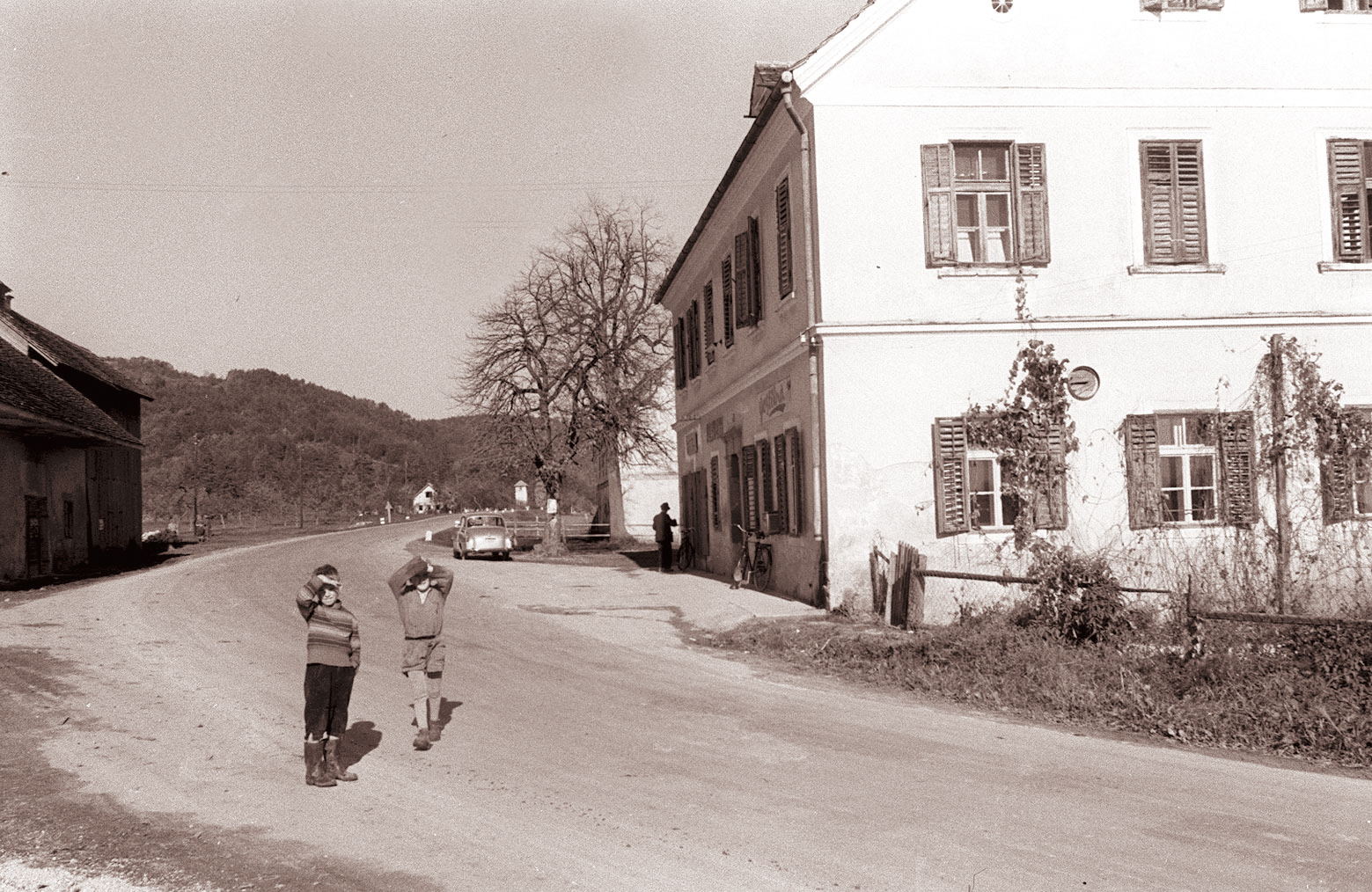

- Location in Slovenia
- Coordinates: 46°17′11.44″N 15°10′50.36″E
- Country: Slovenia
- Traditional region: Styria
- Statistical region: Savinja
- Municipality: Žalec

Area
  - Total: 3.09 km^{2} (1.19 sq mi)
- Elevation: 276.8 m (908 ft)

Population (2002)
  - Total: 400

Velika Pirešica (pronounced [ˈʋeːlika ˈpiːɾɛʃitsa]) is a settlement north of Žalec in east-central Slovenia. The area is part of the traditional region of Styria. The entire Municipality of Žalec is now included in the Savinja Statistical Region.
