= Spodnje Grušovlje =

- Location in Slovenia
- Coordinates: 46°15′56.6″N 15°6′57.07″E
- Country: Slovenia
- Traditional region: Styria
- Statistical region: Savinja
- Municipality: Žalec

Area
  - Total: 1.64 km^{2} (0.63 sq mi)
- Elevation: 275.5 m (904 ft)

Population (2023)
  - Total: 114

Spodnje Grušovlje (pronounced [ˈspoːdnjɛ ɡɾuˈʃoːu̯ljɛ]) is a small settlement in the Municipality of Žalec in east-central Slovenia. It lies in the lower Savinja Valley north of Šempeter v Savinjski Dolini. The area is part of the traditional region of Styria. The municipality is now included in the Savinja Statistical Region.
