= Podlog v Savinjski Dolini =

- Location in Slovenia
- Coordinates: 46°15′51.03″N 15°8′0.1″E
- Country: Slovenia
- Traditional region: Styria
- Statistical region: Savinja
- Municipality: Žalec

Area
  - Total: 2.2 km^{2} (0.85 sq mi)
- Elevation: 272 m (892 ft)

Population (2002)
  - Total: 288

Podlog v Savinjski Dolini (pronounced [ˈpoːdlɔk ʍ saˈʋiːnski dɔˈliːni]; Slovene: Podlog v Savinjski dolini) is a settlement in the Savinja Valley in the Municipality of Žalec in east-central Slovenia. It lies northeast of Šempeter. The area is part of the traditional region of Styria. The municipality is now included in the Savinja Statistical Region.

== Name ==
The name of the settlement was changed from Podlog to Podlog v Savinjski Dolini in 1953.
