= Grče =

- Location in Slovenia
- Coordinates: 46°17′39.07″N 15°7′42.68″E
- Country: Slovenia
- Traditional region: Styria
- Statistical region: Savinja
- Municipality: Žalec

Area
  - Total: 0.7 km^{2} (0.27 sq mi)
- Elevation: 450 m (1,480 ft)

Population (2015)
  - Total: 104

Grče (pronounced [ˈɡəɾtʃɛ]) is a village in the Municipality of Žalec in east-central Slovenia. It lies on the southwest part of the Ponikva Plateau (Slovene: Ponikovska planota). The area is part of the traditional region of Styria. The municipality is now included in the Savinja Statistical Region.

== History ==
Grče was a hamlet of Kale until 2003, when it became a separate settlement.
