= Lisce =

- Location in Slovenia
- Coordinates: 46°13′56″N 15°14′54″E
- Country: Slovenia
- Traditional region: Styria
- Statistical region: Savinja
- Municipality: Celje
- Elevation: 300 m (980 ft)

Lisce (pronounced [ˈliːstsɛ]; German: Laisberg) is a former settlement in the City Municipality of Celje in northeastern Slovenia. It is now part of the city of Celje. The area is part of the traditional region of Styria. The municipality is now included in the Savinja Statistical Region.

== Geography ==
Lisce is a clustered settlement above the right bank of the Savinja River in the southwestern part of Celje, extending from the Levec Bridge to the west to the Raftsman Bridge (Slovene: Splavarski most) on Čop Street—the site of the former Capuchin Bridge (Slovene: Kapucinski most)—to the east. The eastern part of the former village includes Celje's City Park. The lower-lying area near the river and extending to the west is known as Spodnje Lisce (lit. 'lower Lisce'), and the higher area to the south as Gornje Lisce (lit. 'upper Lisce'). The highest elevation is Ana Peak (Slovene: Anski vrh, elevation 462 meters or 1,516 feet).

== Name ==
Lisce was attested in historical sources as am Leiss in 1421, am Leyss in 1428, and auf dem Layßperg in 1444. The name Lisce, like related names (e.g., Lisca), is originally an oronym, probably derived from the adjective lis 'mottled' from Slavic *ly᷉sъ 'bare', referring to a hill or mountain with open treeless areas.

== History ==
Lisce had a population of 119 living in 33 houses in 1870, 143 in 37 houses in 1900, 267 in 53 houses in 1931, and 253 in 106 houses in 1961. In 1971 the population was only 173 in 51 houses because part of the village had been annexed by Celje in 1964.

After the Second World War, the Petriček Inn in Spodnje Lisce was used as an internment and reeducation camp for about 600 children whose parents had been murdered by the communist authorities at the Teharje camp and elsewhere. After the camp was closed, the property was converted back into an inn in 1959.

Part of Lisce was annexed by Celje in 1964, and the remainder was annexed in 1982, ending its existence as an independent settlement.
