= Pernovo =

- Location in Slovenia
- Coordinates: 46°17′12.68″N 15°11′22.14″E
- Country: Slovenia
- Traditional region: Styria
- Statistical region: Savinja
- Municipality: Žalec

Area
  - Total: 1.98 km^{2} (0.76 sq mi)
- Elevation: 276.8 m (908 ft)

Population (2002)
  - Total: 482

Pernovo (pronounced [pɛɾˈnɔːʋɔ] or [pɛɾˈnoːʋɔ]) is a settlement in the Municipality of Žalec in east-central Slovenia. It lies in the southwestern part of the Hudinja Hills (Slovene: Hudinjsko gričevje). The area is part of the traditional region of Styria. The municipality is now included in the Savinja Statistical Region.

The local church is dedicated to Saint Oswald (Slovene: sveti Ožbolt) and belongs to the Parish of Galicija. It is originally a medieval building with major 17th- and 19th-century rebuilding phases.
