= Zgornje Roje =

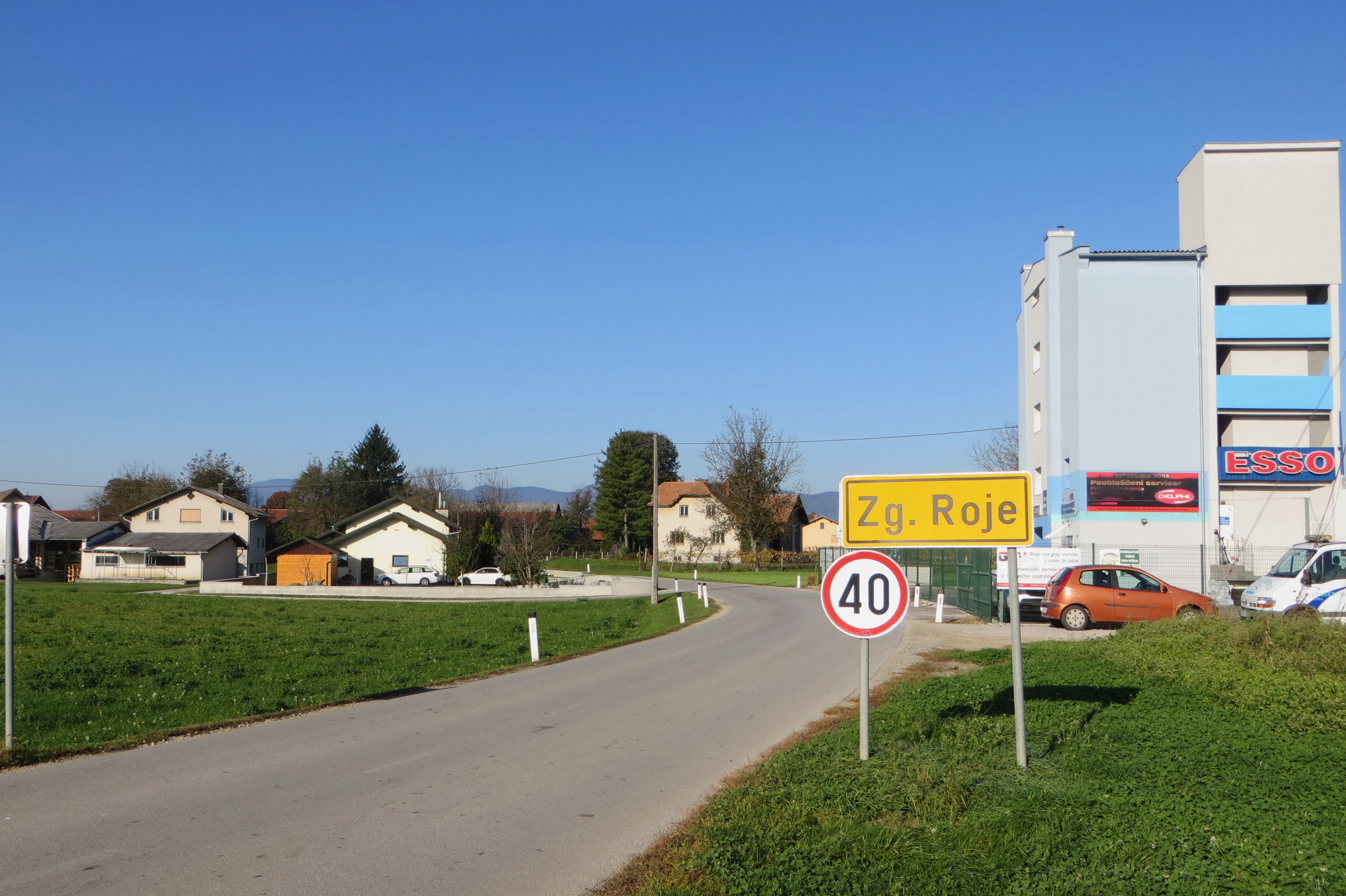

- Location in Slovenia
- Coordinates: 46°14′50.47″N 15°7′49.68″E
- Country: Slovenia
- Traditional region: Styria
- Statistical region: Savinja
- Municipality: Žalec

Area
  - Total: 1.27 km^{2} (0.49 sq mi)
- Elevation: 262.6 m (862 ft)

Population (2002)
  - Total: 123

Zgornje Roje (pronounced [ˈzɡoːɾnjɛ ˈɾoːjɛ]) is a settlement in the Municipality of Žalec in east-central Slovenia. It lies on the left bank of the Savinja River southeast of Šempeter v Savinjski Dolini. The area is part of the traditional region of Styria. The municipality is now included in the Savinja Statistical Region.

== Name ==
The name Zgornje Roje literally means 'upper Roje'; the elevation of the village is about 3 meters (9.8 ft) higher than that of neighboring Spodnje Roje (literally, 'lower Roje'). The two villages were attested in historical sources in 1350 as Roͤdein in 1350, zu Royach in 1402, and zu Rayach in 1436, among other spellings. The name comes from the common noun roja 'ditch, drainage canal', referring to a damp meadow or field drained for cultivation. The noun was borrowed into Slovene from Friulian ròja 'drainage canal'.
