= Studence =

Studence is name of two Slovenian settlements:

- Studence, Hrastnik, in Hrastnik municipality;
- Studence, Žalec, in Žalec municipality.
