= Podvin, Žalec =

Podvin
- Location in Slovenia
- Coordinates: 46°15′26.58″N 15°9′52.58″E
- Country: Slovenia
- Traditional region: Styria
- Statistical region: Savinja
- Municipality: Žalec

Area
  - Total: 0.39 km^{2} (0.15 sq mi)
- Elevation: 258.1 m (847 ft)

Population (2002)
  - Total: 345

Podvin (pronounced [pɔˈdʋiːn]) is a small settlement in the Municipality of Žalec in east-central Slovenia. It lies on Ložnica Creek north of Žalec. The area is part of the traditional region of Styria. The municipality is now included in the Savinja Statistical Region.

== History ==
Podvin became a separate settlement in 1991, when its territory was administratively separated from that of Gotovlje and Ložnica pri Žalcu.
