= Zgornje Grušovlje =

- Location in Slovenia
- Coordinates: 46°16′23.51″N 15°6′30.97″E
- Country: Slovenia
- Traditional region: Styria
- Statistical region: Savinja
- Municipality: Žalec

Area
  - Total: 1.39 km^{2} (0.54 sq mi)
- Elevation: 279.6 m (917 ft)

Population (2002)
  - Total: 181

Zgornje Grušovlje (pronounced [ˈzɡoːɾnjɛ ɡɾuˈʃoːu̯ljɛ]) is a settlement in the Municipality of Žalec in east-central Slovenia. It lies in the lower Savinja Valley northwest of Šempeter v Savinjski Dolini. The area is part of the traditional region of Styria. The municipality is now included in the Savinja Statistical Region.

The hamlet of Dolge Njive (Slovene: Dolge njive) in the settlement is the site of a Roman Villa rustica.
