= Celje Airfield =

Celje Airfield Letališče Celje (Letališče Levec)
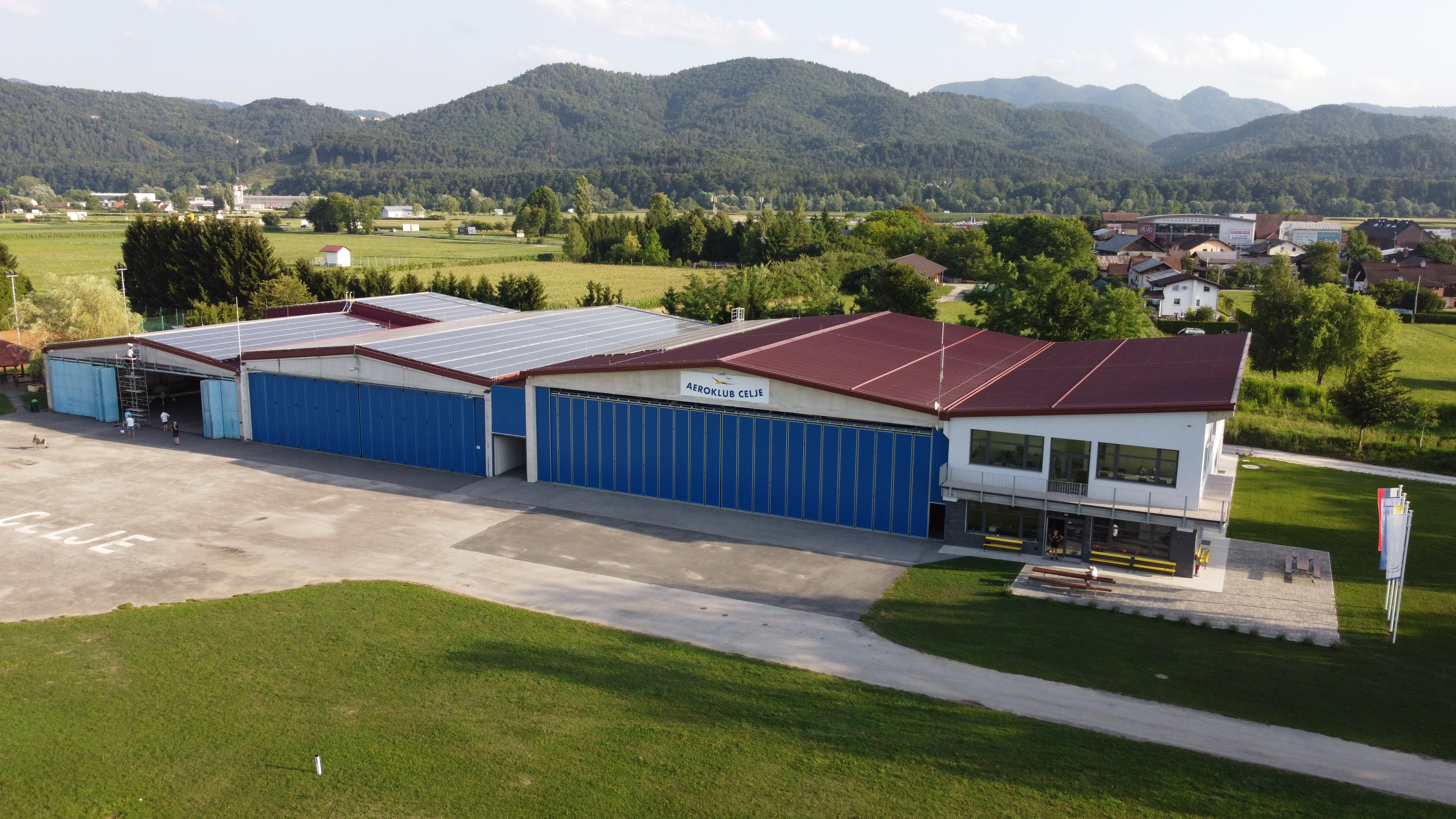
- IATA: none; ICAO: LJCL

Summary
- Airport type: Public
- Operator: Aeroclub Celje
- Serves: Celje
- Location: Levec
- Elevation AMSL: 801 ft / 244 m
- Coordinates: 46°14′37″N 15°13′32″E
- Website: http://www.aeroklub-celje.si/
- Interactive map of Celje Airfield

Runways
Direction	Length		Surface
Direction	ft	m	Surface
		800	Grass

Celje Airfield (ICAO: LJCL) (Slovene: Letališče Celje or Letališče Levec) is a recreational aerodrome, located to the north of Levec near Celje in Slovenia.
