= Migojnice =

- Village
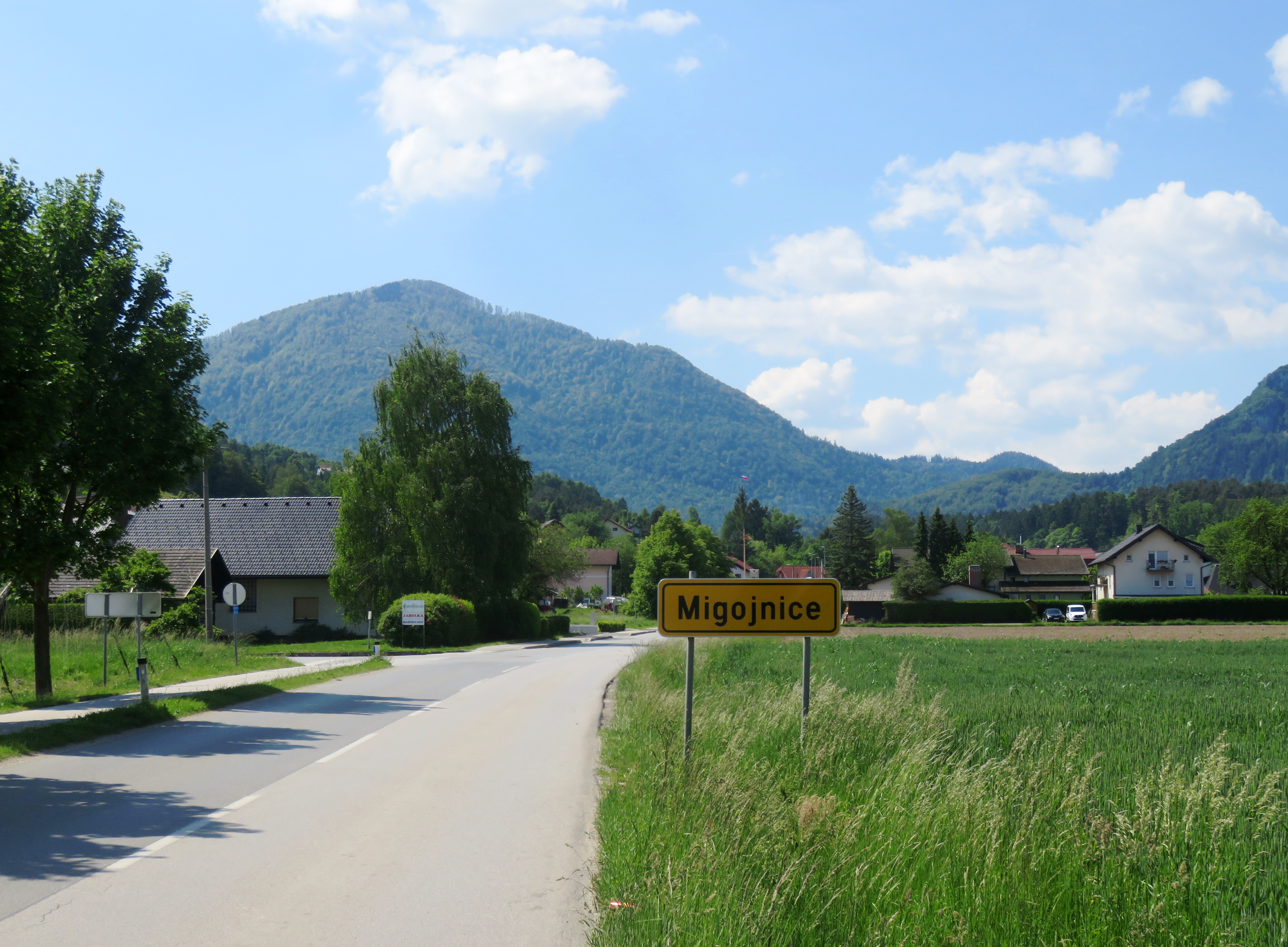

- Location in Slovenia
- Coordinates: 46°13′45.56″N 15°9′31.27″E
- Country: Slovenia
- Traditional region: Styria
- Statistical region: Savinja
- Municipality: Žalec

Area
  - Total: 2.57 km^{2} (0.99 sq mi)
- Elevation: 288.7 m (947 ft)

Population (2002)
  - Total: 629

Migojnice (pronounced [miˈɡoːi̯nitsɛ]) is a village on the right bank of the Savinja River in the Municipality of Žalec in east-central Slovenia. The area is part of the traditional region of Styria. The municipality is now included in the Savinja Statistical Region.

== Name ==
The village was attested in written sources in 1265–67 as Makoyn, and in 1763–87 as Megoiniz. The origin of the name is unclear, but it may be derived from *Maligojnice (based on the personal name *Maligojь) with syncope of the second syllable (cf. Magozd < *Mal(i) gozd). If so, the name would originally mean 'place where Maligojь's people live'.

== Church ==
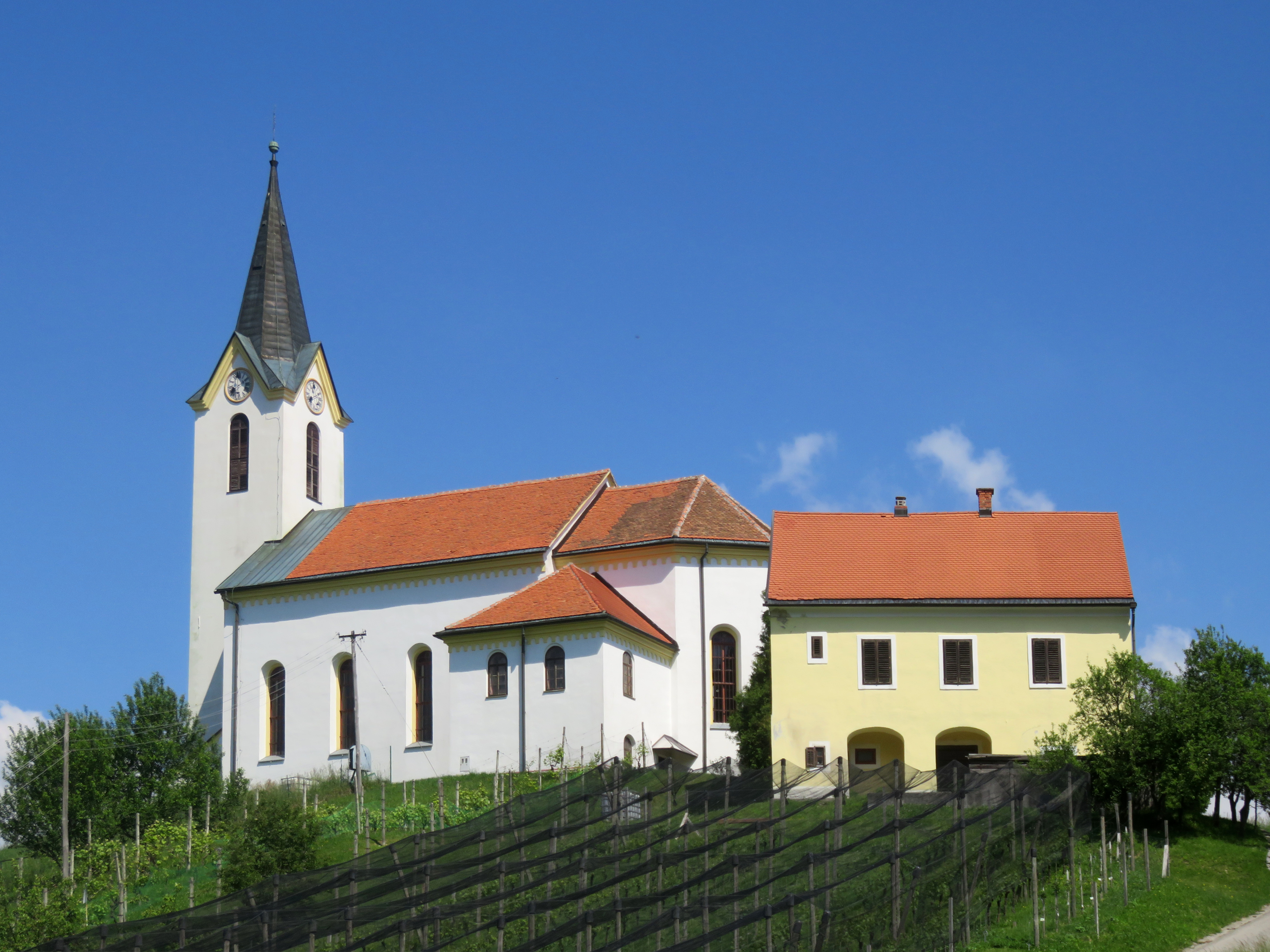
Our Lady of Lourdes Church

The local church is dedicated to Our Lady of Lourdes (Slovene: Lurška Mati božja) and belongs to the Parish of Griže. It was built between 1888 and 1891.
