= Liboje =

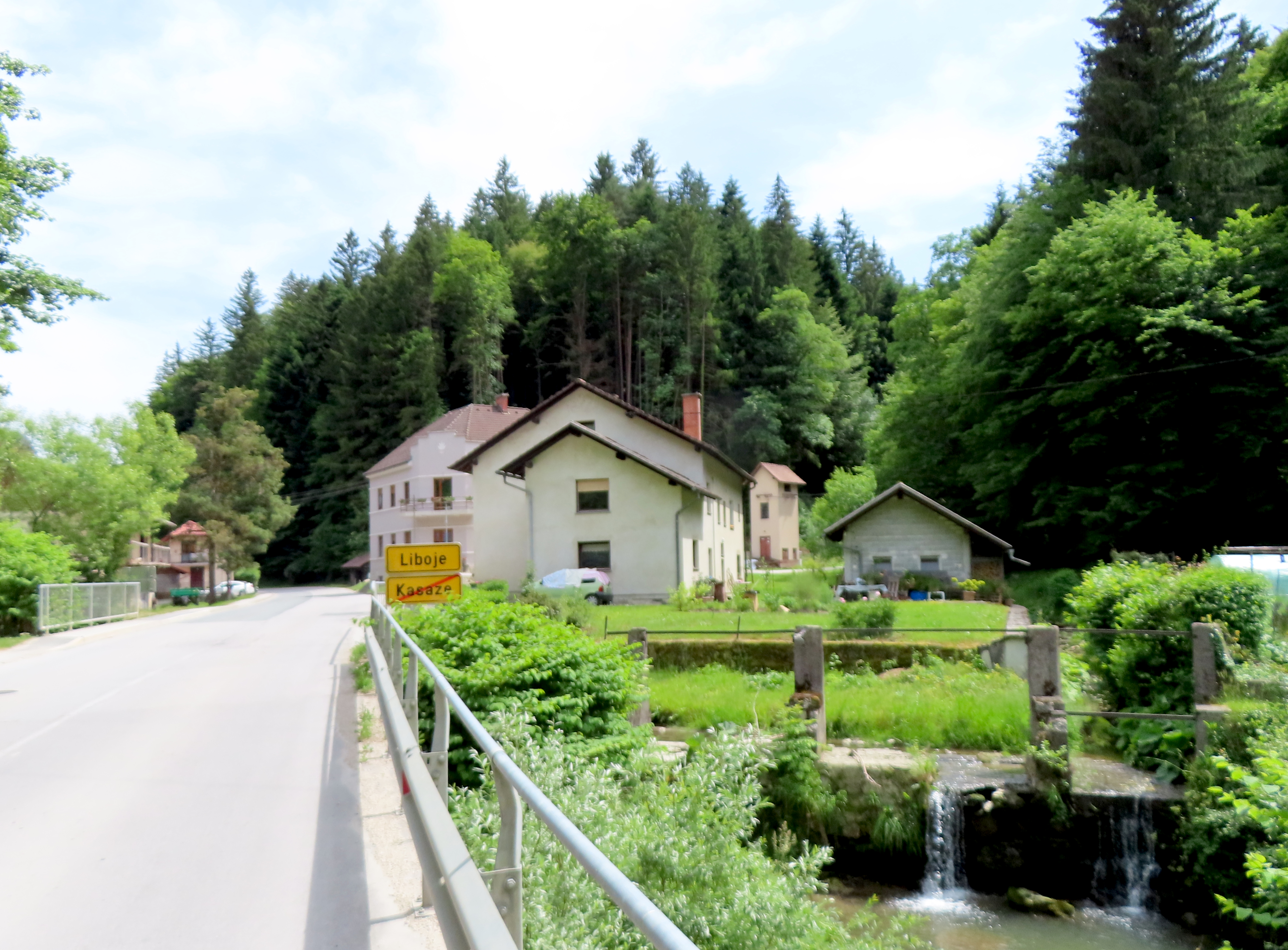

- Location in Slovenia
- Coordinates: 46°12′23.08″N 15°11′40.26″E
- Country: Slovenia
- Traditional region: Styria
- Statistical region: Savinja
- Municipality: Žalec

Area
  - Total: 9.44 km^{2} (3.64 sq mi)
- Elevation: 314.5 m (1,032 ft)

Population (2002)
  - Total: 439

Liboje (pronounced [liˈboːjɛ]) is a settlement in the Municipality of Žalec in east-central Slovenia. It lies in the hills south of Žalec and southwest of Celje. The area is part of the traditional region of Styria. The municipality is now included in the Savinja Statistical Region. It includes the hamlets of Kurja Vas (Slovene: Kurja vas), Straža, and Svetli Dol or Tihi Gaj.

== Name ==
Liboje was attested in written records in 1320 as Lybon (and as Liban in 1368, Lybochendorf in 1378, Liboch(e)ndorff in 1409, Loubuen in 1430, and Lybochendorf in 1441). The origin of the name is unclear; it may be derived from a personal name.

== History ==
In addition to agriculture, industry developed early in the settlement. An alum factory as established in 1784, and was converted to glass production in 1807. Glass production was discontinued at the end of the 19th century. Coal mining began in Liboje in 1799. Both the coal mine and the glassworks were purchased by the Trbovlje Coal Company in 1889. The owner of the glassworks established an elementary school in 1861 for his children. Public education began in Liboje in 1885, and one of the former glassworks buildings was converted into a school in 1922. In March 1934 the miners in Liboje staged a hunger strike, and the local cell of the Communist Party was founded the same year. During the Second World War, the coal mine was attacked by a Partisan unit. The Partisans also operated a relay station and other facilities in the area during the war.

== Church ==
The local church is dedicated to Saint Agnes (Slovene: sveta Neža) and belongs to the Parish of Griže. Its foundations go back to the 14th century and it was first mentioned in written sources in 1540. It was renovated and extended between 1827 and 1828. Subsidence caused the nave to become unstable, and so it was razed. The current structure incorporates the bell tower, sacristy, and chancel of the old church with a new nave built between 1985 and 1999.

== Notable people ==
Notable people that were born or lived in Liboje include:

- Ludvik Cencelj (1919–2011), chemist
