= Arja Vas =

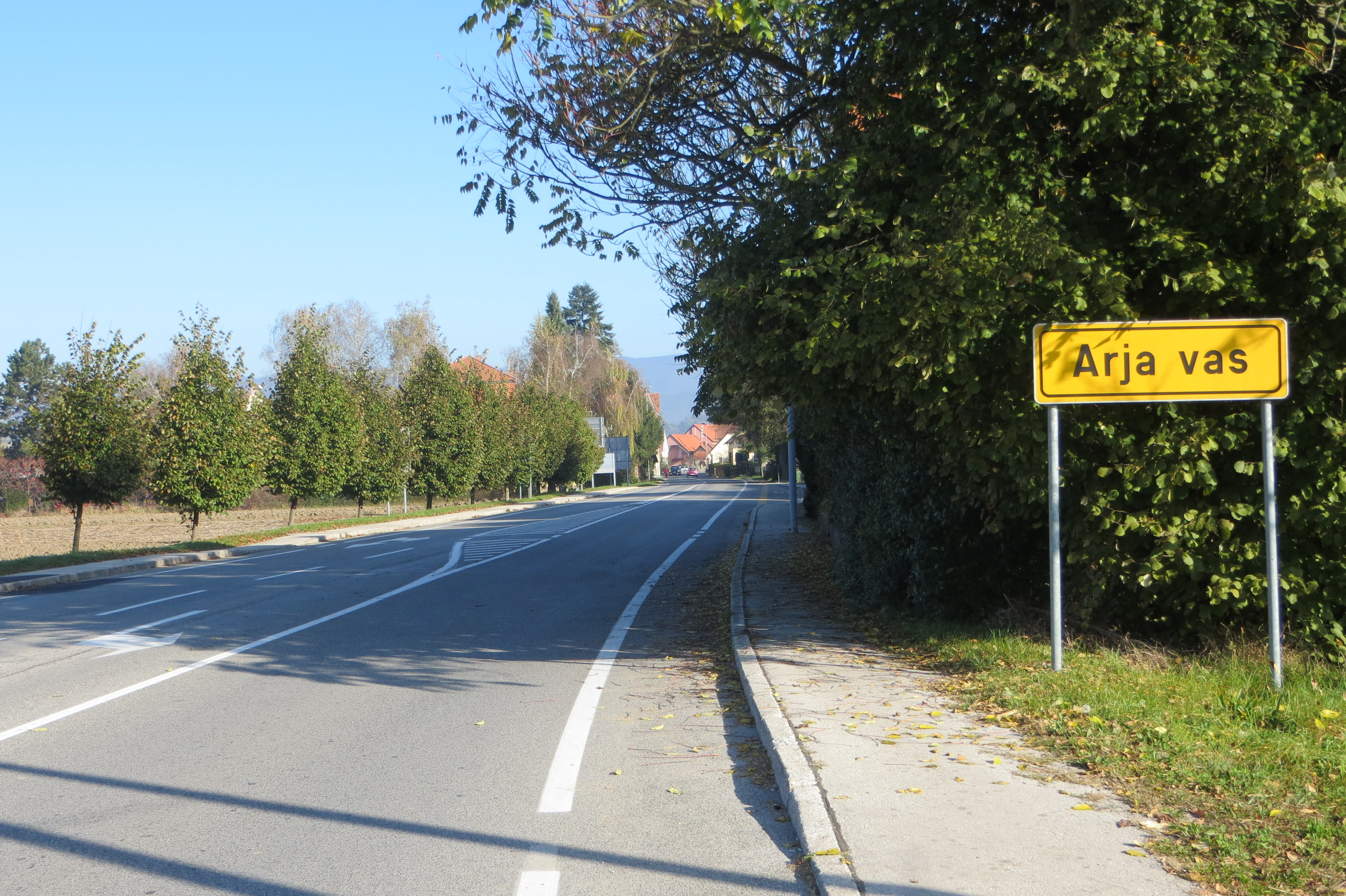

- Location in Slovenia
- Coordinates: 46°15′20.27″N 15°11′35.56″E
- Country: Slovenia
- Traditional region: Styria
- Statistical region: Savinja
- Municipality: Žalec

Area
  - Total: 6.43 km^{2} (2.48 sq mi)
- Elevation: 250.3 m (821 ft)

Population (2002)
  - Total: 523

Arja Vas (pronounced [ˈaɾːja ˈʋaːs]; Slovene: Arja vas, German: Arndorf) is a roadside settlement in the Municipality of Žalec in east-central Slovenia. The A1 motorway crosses the territory of the settlement north of the village. The area is part of the traditional region of Styria. The municipality is now included in the Savinja Statistical Region.

== Name ==
Arja Vas was attested in written sources in 1368 as Bernstorf (and as Wernstorf in 1428, Bernsdorff in 1441, and Wernsdorff in 1454). The name in modern German was Arndorf, and in the local dialect the settlement is known as Vrja ves. Based on the local name and the medieval attestations, the name is based on an adjective form of the personal name *Var or *Varo, thus originally meaning 'Var(o)'s village'. The initial Slovene V- and German W- was lost because it was reanalyzed as the Slovene preposition v 'in'.

== Shrine ==
The village chapel-shrine dates to the early 20th century and was renovated in 2008.
