= Brnica, Žalec =

Brnica Sveti Križ (until 1953)
- Location in Slovenia
- Coordinates: 46°13′22.95″N 15°12′11.74″E
- Country: Slovenia
- Traditional region: Styria
- Statistical region: Savinja
- Municipality: Žalec

Area
  - Total: 1.34 km^{2} (0.52 sq mi)
- Elevation: 419.9 m (1,378 ft)

Population (2002)
  - Total: 48

Brnica (pronounced [ˈbəɾnitsa]) is a small settlement in hills on the right bank of the Savinja River in the Municipality of Žalec in east-central Slovenia. The area is part of the traditional region of Styria. The municipality is now included in the Savinja Statistical Region.

== Name ==
The name of the settlement was changed from Sveti Križ (literally, 'Holy Cross') to Brnica in 1953. The name was changed on the basis of the 1948 Law on Names of Settlements and Designations of Squares, Streets, and Buildings as part of efforts by Slovenia's postwar communist government to remove religious elements from toponyms.
