= Zaloška Gorica =

Zaloška Gorica Gorica (until 1953)
- Location in Slovenia
- Coordinates: 46°16′12.35″N 15°12′13.31″E
- Country: Slovenia
- Traditional region: Styria
- Statistical region: Savinja
- Municipality: Žalec

Area
  - Total: 1.72 km^{2} (0.66 sq mi)
- Elevation: 282.6 m (927 ft)

Population (2002)
  - Total: 46

Zaloška Gorica (pronounced [ˈzaːlɔʃka ɡɔˈɾiːtsa]) is a settlement in the Municipality of Žalec in east-central Slovenia. The area is part of the traditional region of Styria. The municipality is now included in the Savinja Statistical Region.

The A1 motorway crosses the territory of the settlement south of the settlement core. When it was being built in 1988, the 17th-century Zalog Mansion (Slovene: Dvorec Zalog), which had fallen into disrepair after the Second World War, was demolished. The site with what remains of a park associated with the estate is included in the Slovenian Ministry of Culture register of national heritage.

== Name ==
The name of the settlement was changed from Gorica to Zaloška Gorica in 1953.
