= Ložnica pri Žalcu =

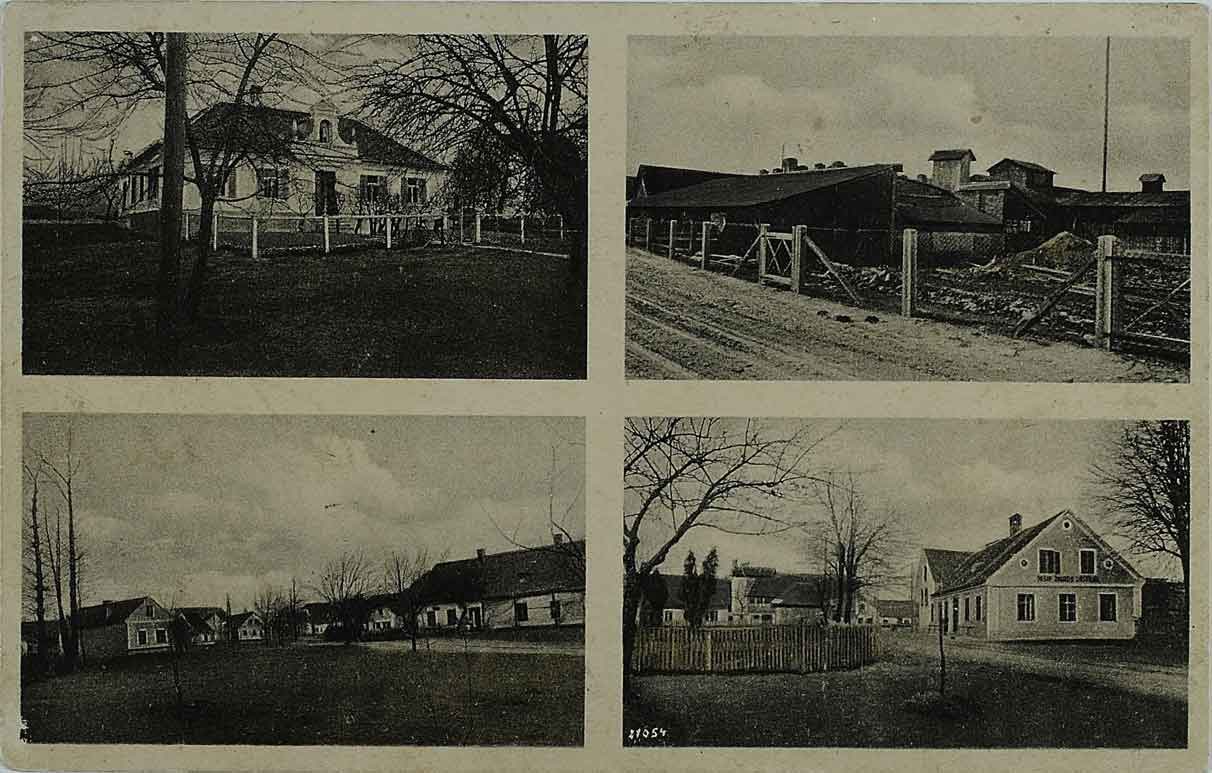
- 1934 postcard of Ložnica pri Žalcu

- Location in Slovenia
- Coordinates: 46°15′36.91″N 15°10′17.83″E
- Country: Slovenia
- Traditional region: Styria
- Statistical region: Savinja
- Municipality: Žalec

Area
  - Total: 2.38 km^{2} (0.92 sq mi)
- Elevation: 257.9 m (846 ft)

Population (2002)
  - Total: 413

Ložnica pri Žalcu (pronounced [lɔˈʒniːtsa pɾi ˈʒaːu̯tsu]) is a settlement north of Žalec in east-central Slovenia. The A1 motorway crosses the territory of the settlement north of the village. The area is part of the traditional region of Styria. The entire Municipality of Žalec is now included in the Savinja Statistical Region.

== History ==
The settlement of Ložnica pri Žalcu was created in 1953, when the formerly separate villages of Spodnja Ložnica and Zgornja Ložnica were merged into a single settlement.
