= Zavrh pri Galiciji =

- Location in Slovenia
- Coordinates: 46°18′36.72″N 15°13′1.99″E
- Country: Slovenia
- Traditional region: Styria
- Statistical region: Savinja
- Municipality: Žalec

Area
  - Total: 1.97 km^{2} (0.76 sq mi)
- Elevation: 380.6 m (1,249 ft)

Population (2002)
  - Total: 141

Zavrh pri Galiciji (pronounced [zaˈʋəɾx pɾi ɡaˈliːtsiji]) is a settlement in the Municipality of Žalec in east-central Slovenia. It lies in the Hudinja Hills (Slovene: Hudinjsko gričevje) northeast of Žalec. The area is included in the Savinja Statistical Region and is part of the traditional region of Styria.

== Name ==
The name of the settlement was changed from Zavrh to Zavrh pri Galiciji in 1953.
