= Hramše =

- Location in Slovenia
- Coordinates: 46°18′46.79″N 15°11′12.23″E
- Country: Slovenia
- Traditional region: Styria
- Statistical region: Savinja
- Municipality: Žalec

Area
  - Total: 5.91 km^{2} (2.28 sq mi)
- Elevation: 572.5 m (1,878 ft)

Population (2002)
  - Total: 172

Hramše (pronounced [ˈxɾaːmʃɛ]) is a village in the Municipality of Žalec in east-central Slovenia. It lies in the Hudinja Hills (Slovene: Hudinjsko gričevje) north of Žalec. The area is part of the traditional region of Styria. The municipality is now included in the Savinja Statistical Region.
