= Vrbje, Žalec =

Vrbje
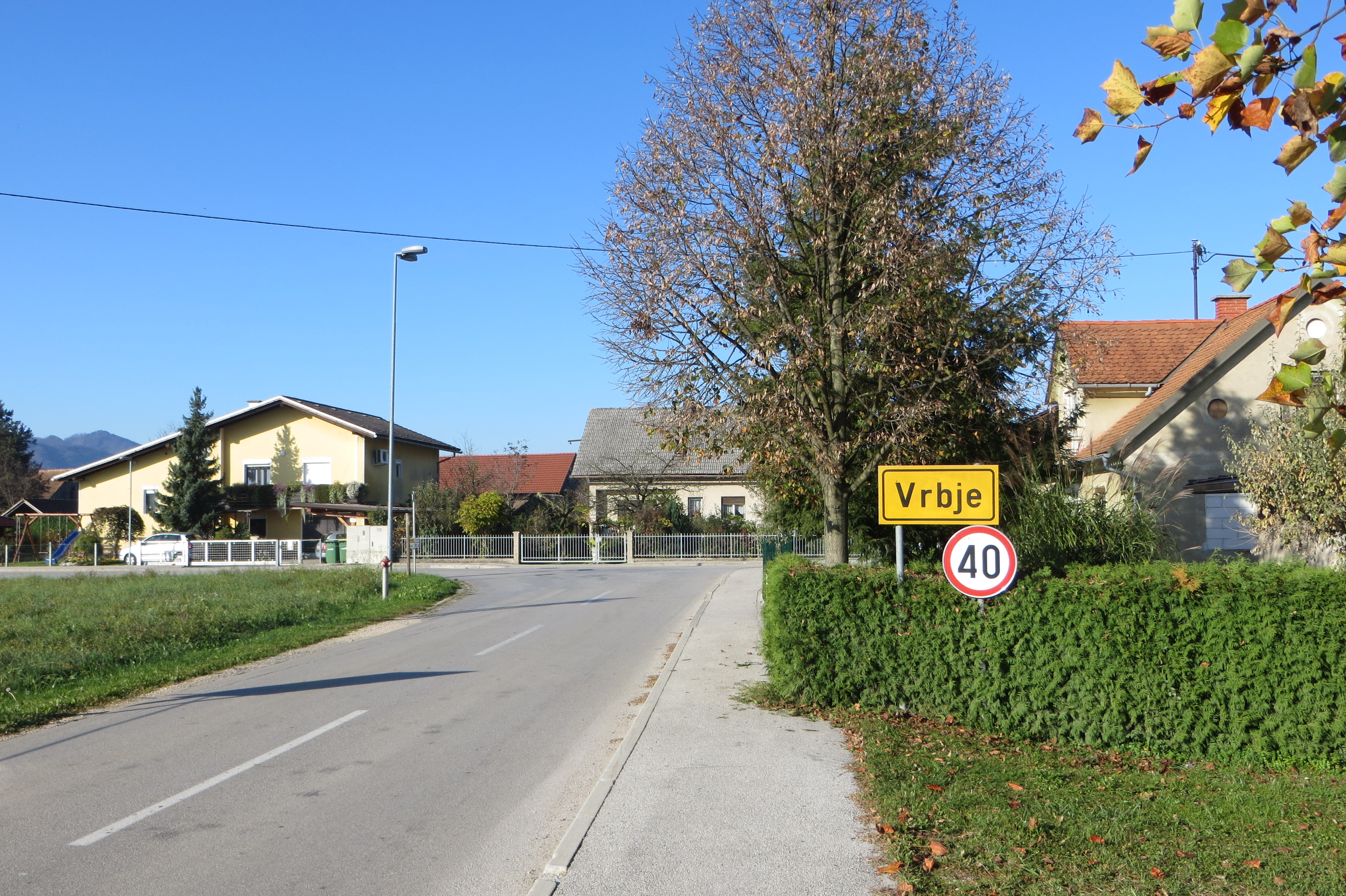

- Location in Slovenia
- Coordinates: 46°14′49.07″N 15°9′12.32″E
- Country: Slovenia
- Traditional region: Styria
- Statistical region: Savinja
- Municipality: Žalec

Area
  - Total: 2.56 km^{2} (0.99 sq mi)
- Elevation: 255.7 m (839 ft)

Population (2002)
  - Total: 577

Vrbje (pronounced [ˈʋəɾbjɛ]) is a settlement in the Municipality of Žalec in east-central Slovenia. It lies south of Žalec on the left bank of the Savinja River. The area is part of the traditional region of Styria. The municipality is now included in the Savinja Statistical Region.
