= Mala Pirešica =

- Location in Slovenia
- Coordinates: 46°16′22.78″N 15°11′35.04″E
- Country: Slovenia
- Traditional region: Styria
- Statistical region: Savinja
- Municipality: Žalec

Area
  - Total: 1.1 km^{2} (0.42 sq mi)
- Elevation: 265.1 m (870 ft)

Population (2002)
  - Total: 71

Mala Pirešica (pronounced [ˈmaːla ˈpiːɾɛʃitsa]) is a settlement in the lower Savinja Valley in the Municipality of Žalec in east-central Slovenia. The A1 motorway crosses the territory of the settlement south of the village core. The area is part of the traditional region of Styria. The municipality is now included in the Savinja Statistical Region.

A small roadside chapel-shrine in the settlement dates to the early 20th century.
