= Ponikva pri Žalcu =

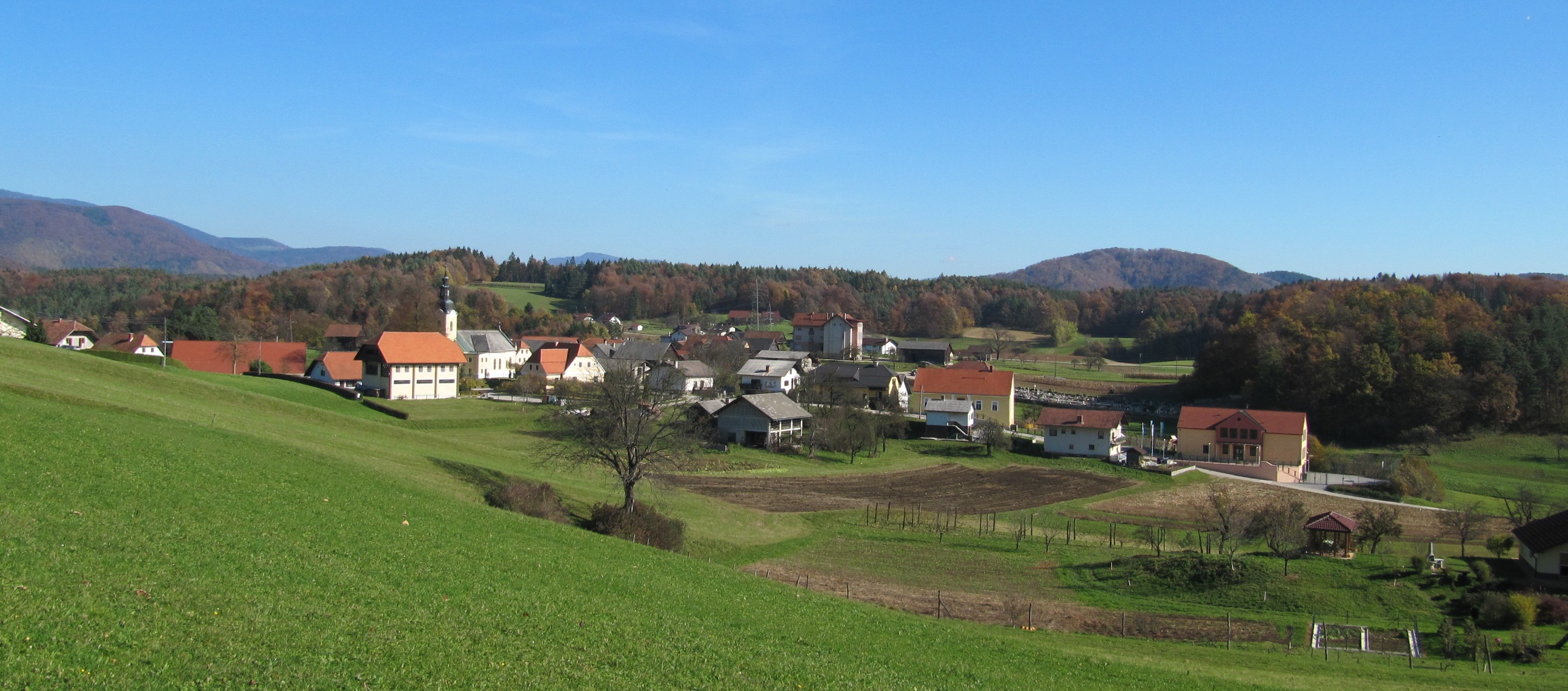

- Location in Slovenia
- Coordinates: 46°18′49.49″N 15°8′8.49″E
- Country: Slovenia
- Traditional region: Styria
- Statistical region: Savinja
- Municipality: Žalec

Area
  - Total: 5.31 km^{2} (2.05 sq mi)
- Elevation: 418.5 m (1,373 ft)

Population (2002)
  - Total: 339

Ponikva pri Žalcu (pronounced [ˈpoːnikʋa pɾi ˈʒaːu̯tsu]) is a village in the Municipality of Žalec in east-central Slovenia. It lies in the Ložnica Hills (Slovene: Ložniško gričevje) northwest of Žalec. The area is part of the traditional region of Styria. The municipality is now included in the Savinja Statistical Region.

== History ==
The settlement of Ponikva pri Žalcu was created in 1953, when the formerly separate villages of Spodnja Ponikva and Zgornja Ponikva were merged into a single settlement.

== Church ==
The parish church in the settlement is dedicated to Saint Pancras (Slovene: sveti Pankracij) and belongs to the Roman Catholic Diocese of Celje. It was a 16th-century building that was rebuilt in 1925.
