= Kasaze =

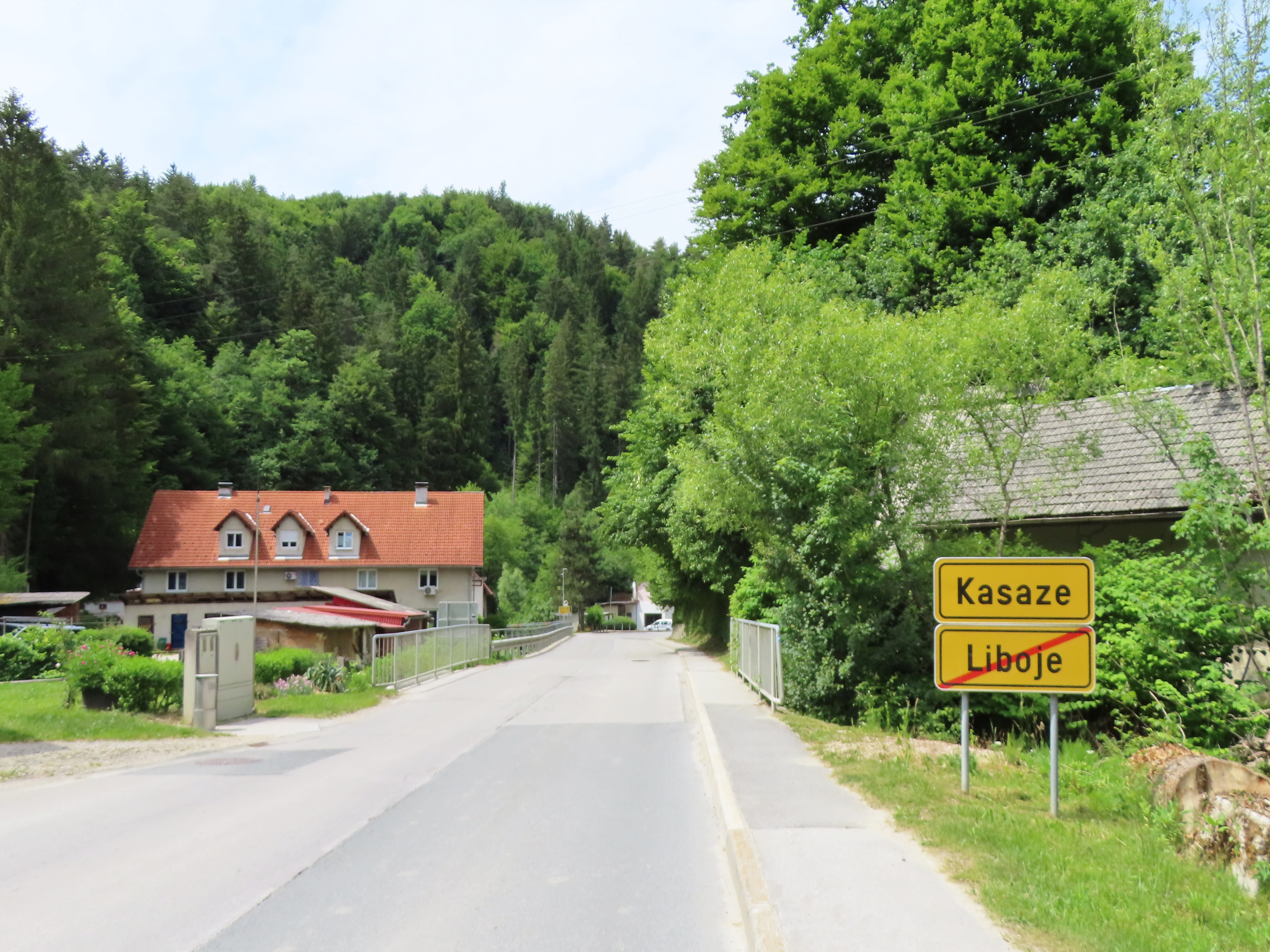

- Location in Slovenia
- Coordinates: 46°13′20.14″N 15°11′10.13″E
- Country: Slovenia
- Traditional region: Styria
- Statistical region: Savinja
- Municipality: Žalec

Area
  - Total: 3.97 km^{2} (1.53 sq mi)
- Elevation: 270.4 m (887 ft)

Population (2014)
  - Total: 827

Kasaze (pronounced [ˈkaːsazɛ]) is a village on the right bank of the Savinja River in the Municipality of Žalec in east-central Slovenia. The area is part of the traditional region of Styria. The municipality is now included in the Savinja Statistical Region.
