= Železno, Žalec =

Železno
- Location in Slovenia
- Coordinates: 46°17′32.42″N 15°11′34.82″E
- Country: Slovenia
- Traditional region: Styria
- Statistical region: Savinja
- Municipality: Žalec

Area
  - Total: 0.73 km^{2} (0.28 sq mi)
- Elevation: 346 m (1,135 ft)

Population (2002)
  - Total: 168

Železno (pronounced [ʒɛˈleːznɔ]) is a small settlement in the Municipality of Žalec in east-central Slovenia. It lies on the southwestern edge of the Hudinja Hills (Slovene: Hudinjsko gričevje) north of Žalec. The area is part of the traditional region of Styria. The municipality is now included in the Savinja Statistical Region.
