= Podkraj, Žalec =

Podkraj
- Location in Slovenia
- Coordinates: 46°19′39.01″N 15°8′34.33″E
- Country: Slovenia
- Traditional region: Styria
- Statistical region: Savinja
- Municipality: Žalec

Area
  - Total: 3.26 km^{2} (1.26 sq mi)
- Elevation: 358.4 m (1,176 ft)

Population (2002)
  - Total: 210

Podkraj (pronounced [pɔtˈkɾai̯]) is a settlement in the Municipality of Žalec in east-central Slovenia. It lies in the eastern part of the Ložnica Hills (Slovene: Ložniško gričevje) north of Žalec. The area is part of the traditional region of Styria. The municipality is now included in the Savinja Statistical Region.
