= Ruše, Žalec =

Ruše
- Location in Slovenia
- Coordinates: 46°15′55.22″N 15°11′50.82″E
- Country: Slovenia
- Traditional region: Styria
- Statistical region: Savinja
- Municipality: Žalec

Area
  - Total: 0.68 km^{2} (0.26 sq mi)
- Elevation: 267.2 m (877 ft)

Population (2002)
  - Total: 69

Ruše (pronounced [ˈɾuːʃɛ]) is a small settlement in the Municipality of Žalec in east-central Slovenia. The A1 motorway runs just north of the village. The area is part of the traditional region of Styria. The municipality is now included in the Savinja Statistical Region.
