= Kale, Žalec =

Kale
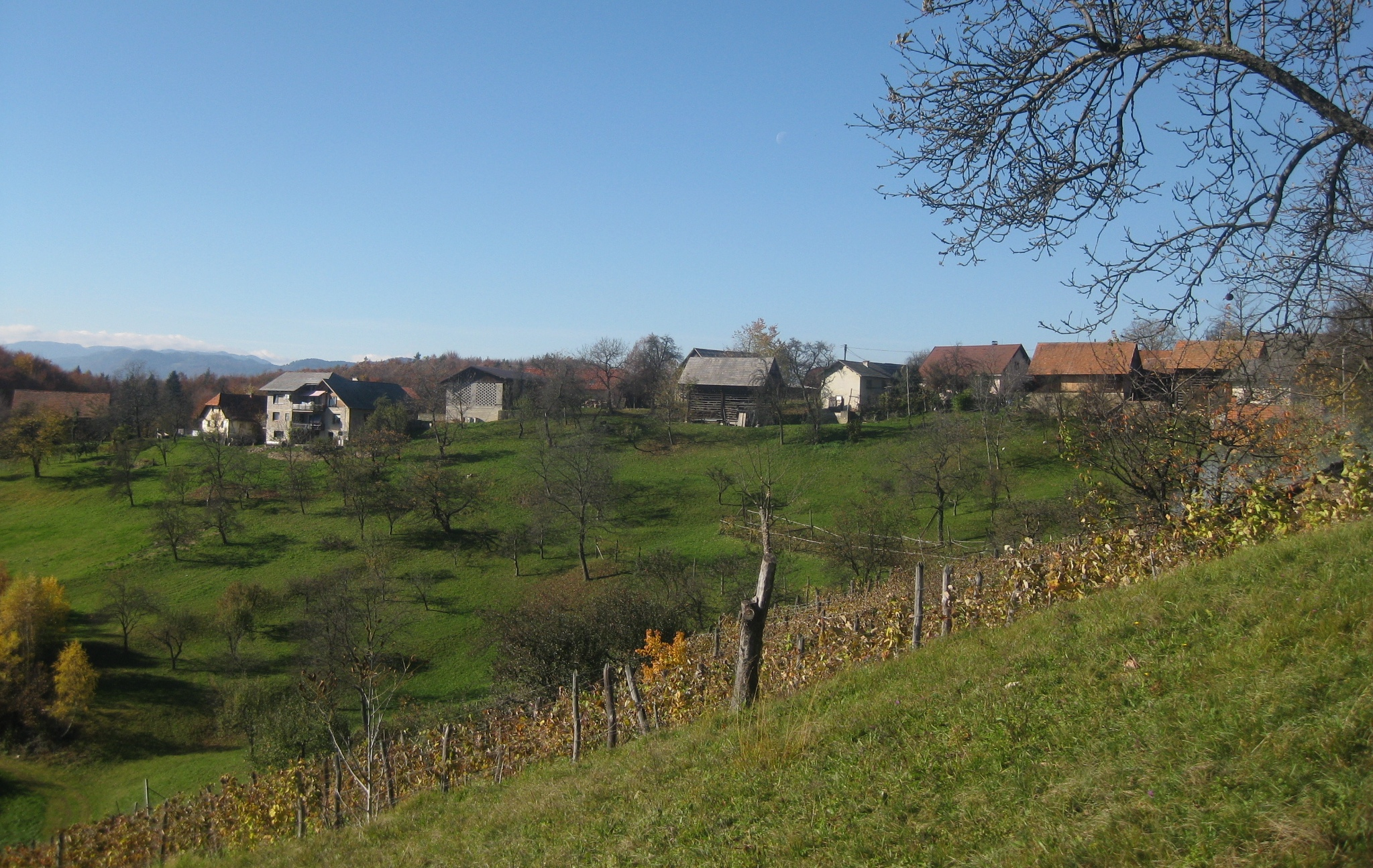

- Location in Slovenia
- Coordinates: 46°18′11.3″N 15°7′42.22″E
- Country: Slovenia
- Traditional region: Styria
- Statistical region: Savinja
- Municipality: Žalec

Area
  - Total: 2.68 km^{2} (1.03 sq mi)
- Elevation: 448.4 m (1,471 ft)

Population (2002)
  - Total: 168

Kale (pronounced [ˈkaːlɛ]) is a village in the Municipality of Žalec in east-central Slovenia. It lies in the Ložnica Hills (Slovene: Ložniško gričevje) north of Šempeter v Savinjski Dolini. The area is part of the traditional region of Styria. The municipality is now included in the Savinja Statistical Region.

A small chapel-shrine in the settlement dates to the late 19th century.
