= Galicija, Žalec =

Galicija
- Location in Slovenia
- Coordinates: 46°17′1.2″N 15°12′43.39″E
- Country: Slovenia
- Traditional region: Styria
- Statistical region: Savinja
- Municipality: Žalec

Area
  - Total: 4.92 km^{2} (1.90 sq mi)
- Elevation: 330.6 m (1,085 ft)

Population (2002)
  - Total: 530

Galicija (pronounced [ɡaˈliːtsija]) is a settlement in the Municipality of Žalec in east-central Slovenia. It lies in the Hudinja Hills (Slovene: Hudinjsko gričevje) north of Žalec. The area is part of the traditional region of Styria. The municipality is now included in the Savinja Statistical Region.

The parish church in the settlement is dedicated to Saint James (Slovene: sveti Jakob) and belongs to the Roman Catholic Diocese of Celje. It was built between 1772 and 1778 on the site of a 16th-century church.
