= Studence, Žalec =

Studence
- Location in Slovenia
- Coordinates: 46°17′51.09″N 15°9′20.31″E
- Country: Slovenia
- Traditional region: Styria
- Statistical region: Savinja
- Municipality: Žalec

Area
  - Total: 6.59 km^{2} (2.54 sq mi)
- Elevation: 432 m (1,417 ft)

Population (2002)
  - Total: 479

Studence (pronounced [stuˈdɛːntsɛ]) is a settlement in the Municipality of Žalec in east-central Slovenia. It lies in the hills north of Žalec. The area is part of the traditional region of Styria. The municipality is now included in the Savinja Statistical Region.

Finds from Bezgec Cave (Slovene: Bezgečeva jama) near the settlement show evidence of Eneolithic settlement.
