= Levec =

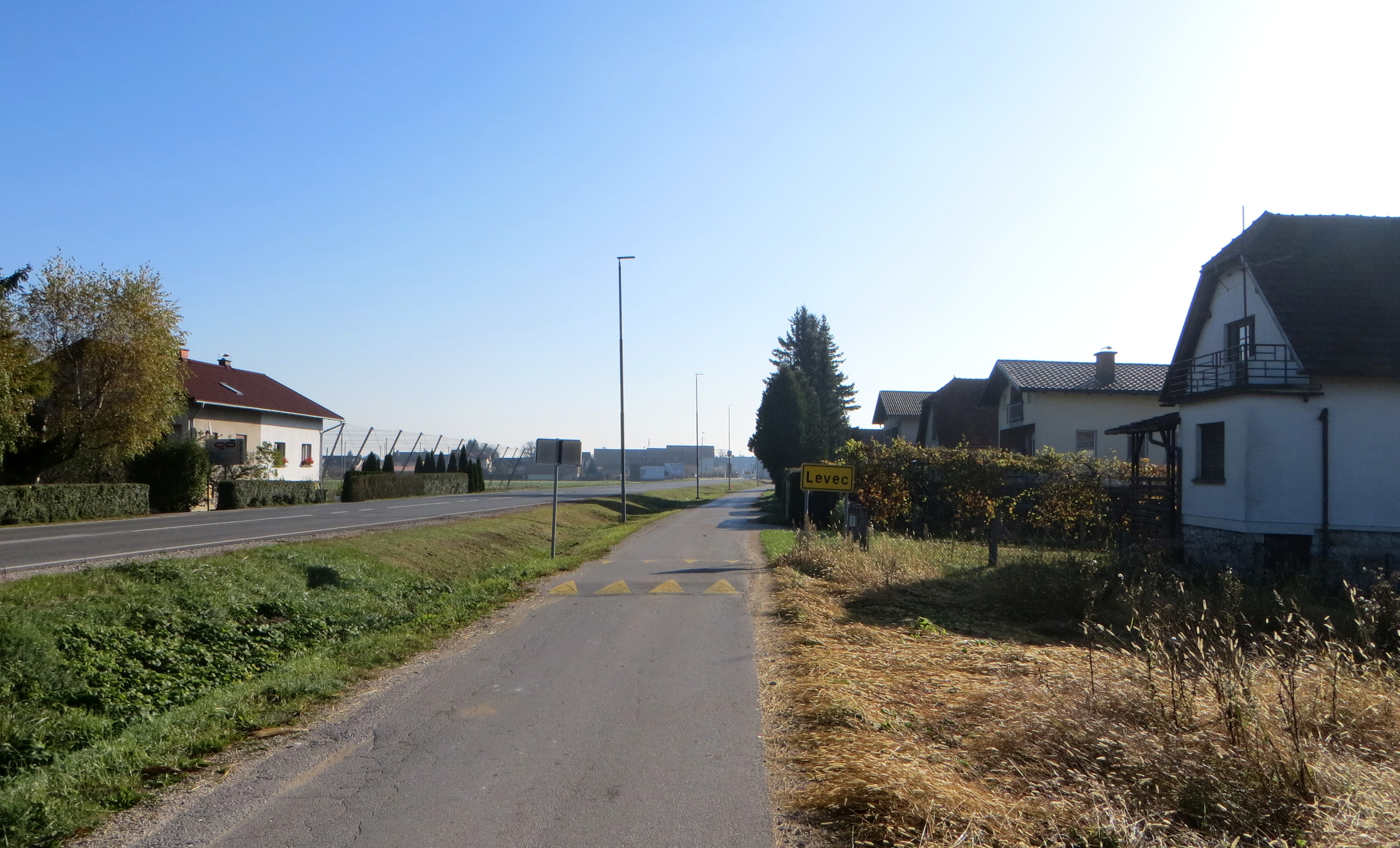

- Location in Slovenia
- Coordinates: 46°14′26.02″N 15°13′0.06″E
- Country: Slovenia
- Traditional region: Styria
- Statistical region: Savinja
- Municipality: Žalec

Area
  - Total: 1.76 km^{2} (0.68 sq mi)
- Elevation: 244.3 m (802 ft)

Population (2002)
  - Total: 422

Levec (pronounced [ˈleːʋəts]) is a village in the Municipality of Žalec in east-central Slovenia. It lies on the left bank of the Savinja River between Žalec and Celje. The area is part of the traditional region of Styria. The municipality is now included in the Savinja Statistical Region.

Remnants of Roman graves have been regularly uncovered during construction work in the eastern part of the settlement. The site is believed to be the western end of the Roman necropolis of Celeia.
