= Griže, Žalec =

Griže
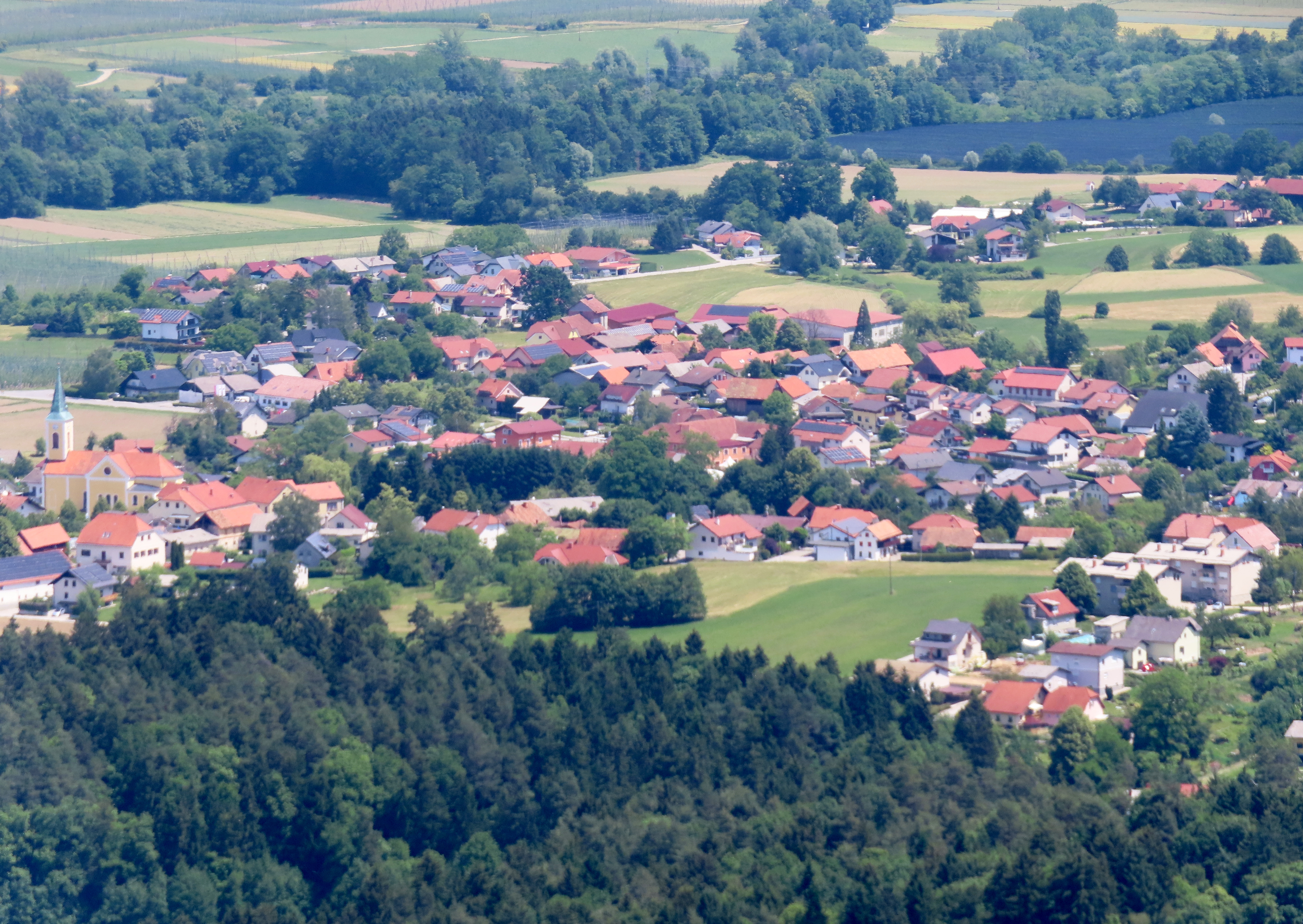

- Location in Slovenia
- Coordinates: 46°13′51.73″N 15°9′15.42″E
- Country: Slovenia
- Traditional region: Styria
- Statistical region: Savinja
- Municipality: Žalec

Area
  - Total: 1.4 km^{2} (0.54 sq mi)
- Elevation: 290.6 m (953 ft)

Population (2020)
  - Total: 632

Griže (pronounced [ˈɡɾiːʒɛ], German: Greis) is a village on the right bank of the Savinja River in the Municipality of Žalec in east-central Slovenia. The area is part of the traditional region of Styria. The municipality is now included in the Savinja Statistical Region.

== Church ==
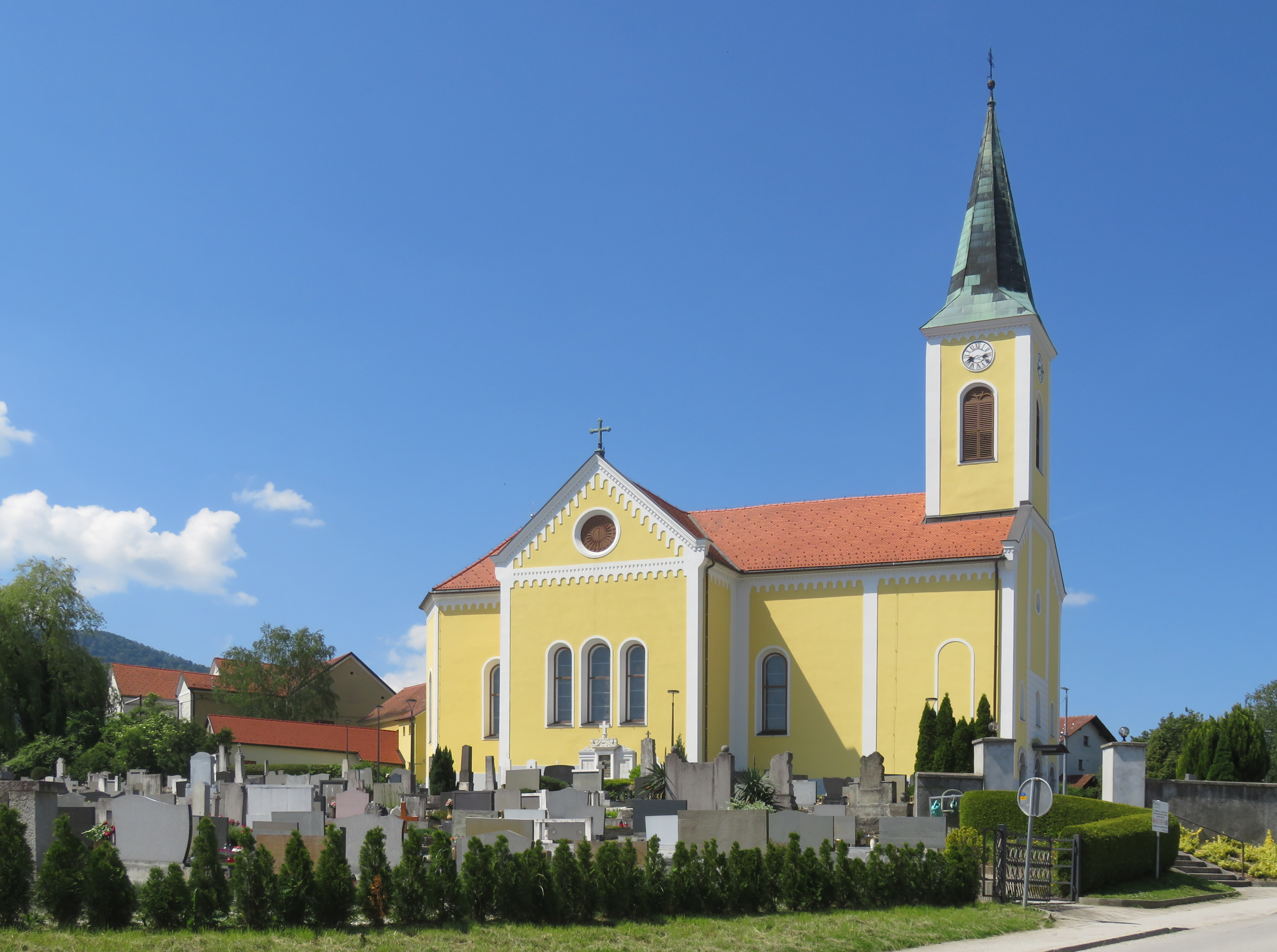
Saint Pancras's Church

The parish church in the settlement is dedicated to Saint Pancras (Slovene: sveti Pankracij) and belongs to the Roman Catholic Diocese of Celje. It was a Gothic building from the late 15th century that was rebuilt in 1883.

== Notable people ==
- Janez Goličnik (1737–1807), beekeeper and translator
