= Žalec =

- Town
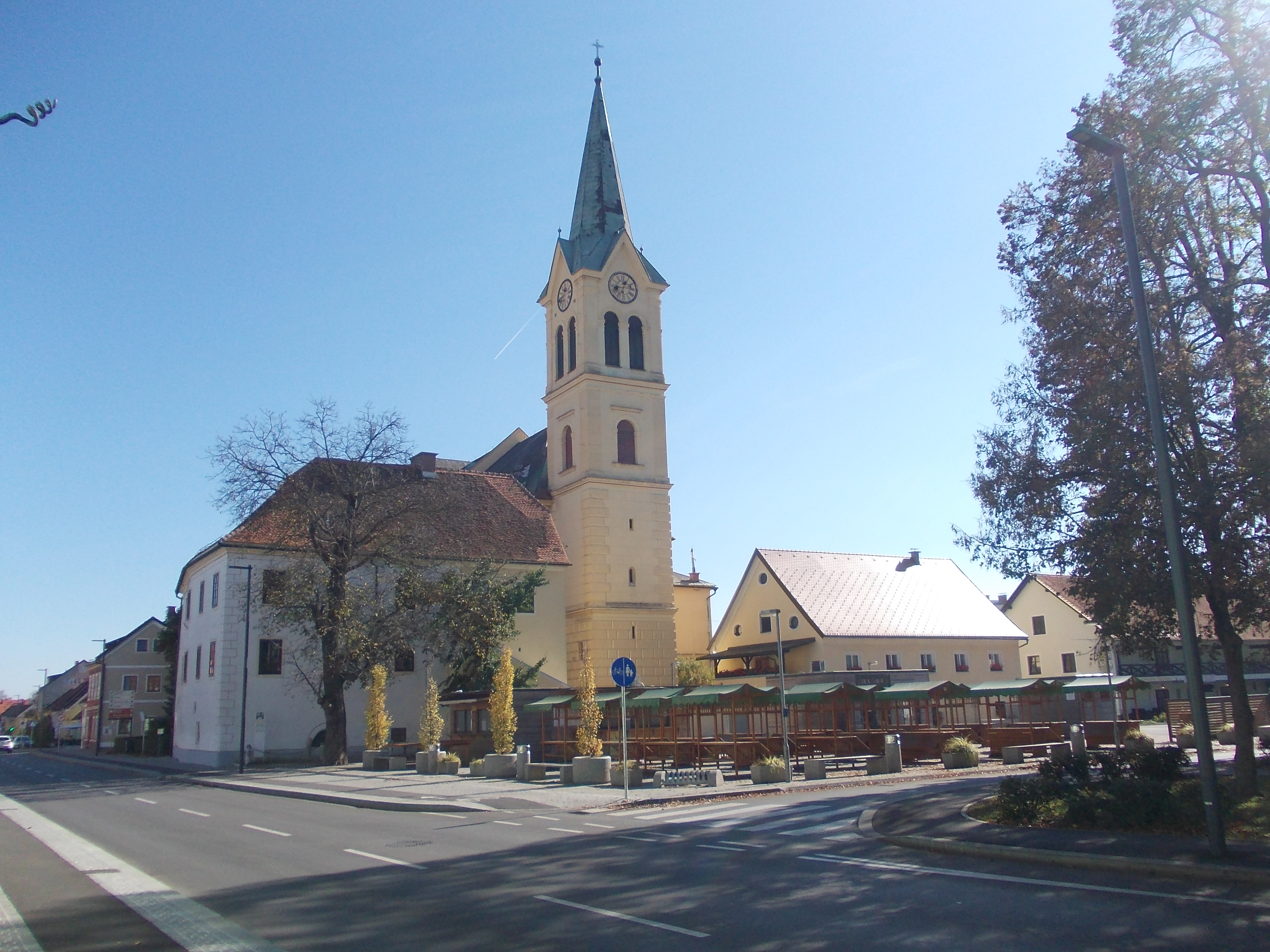
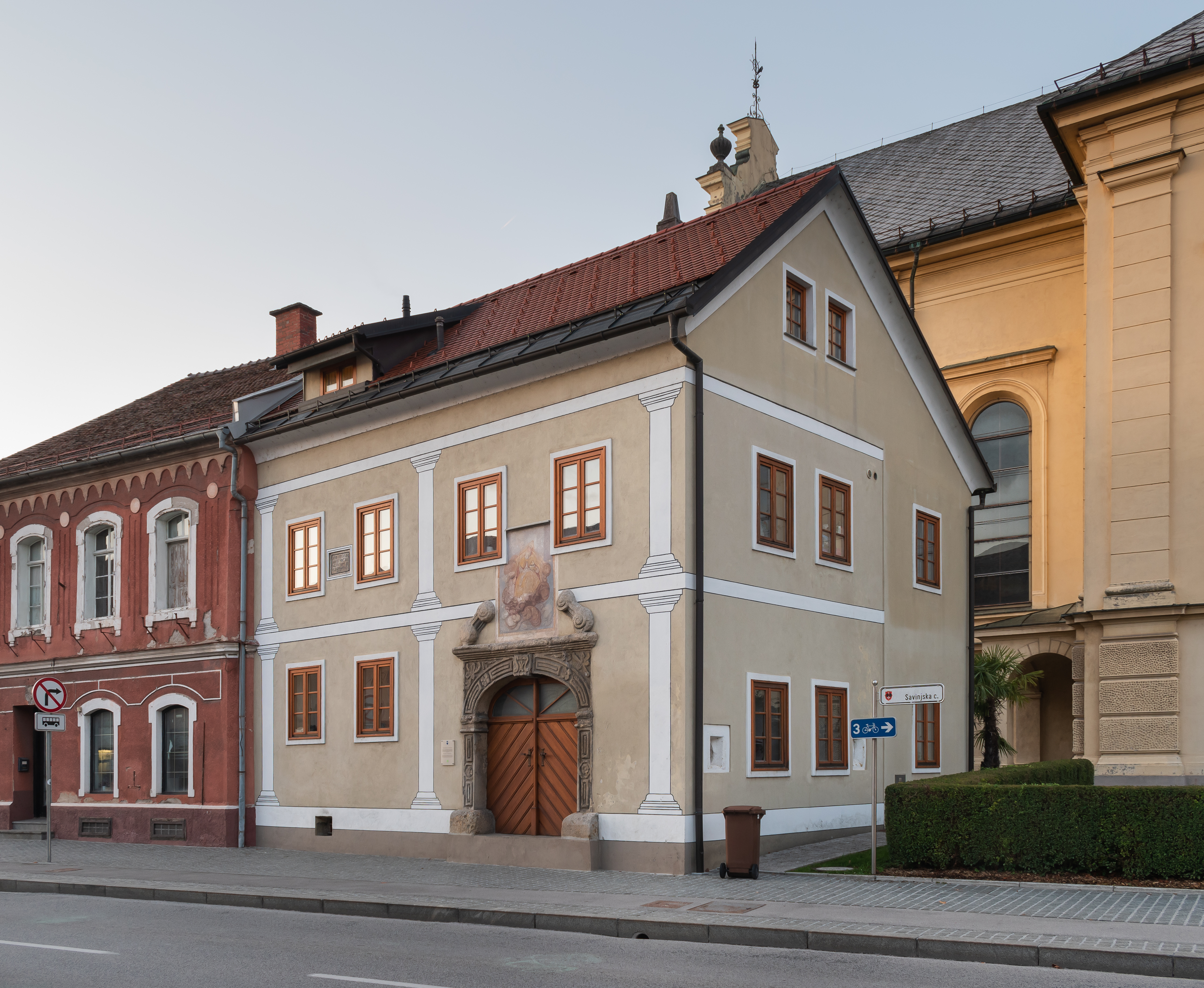
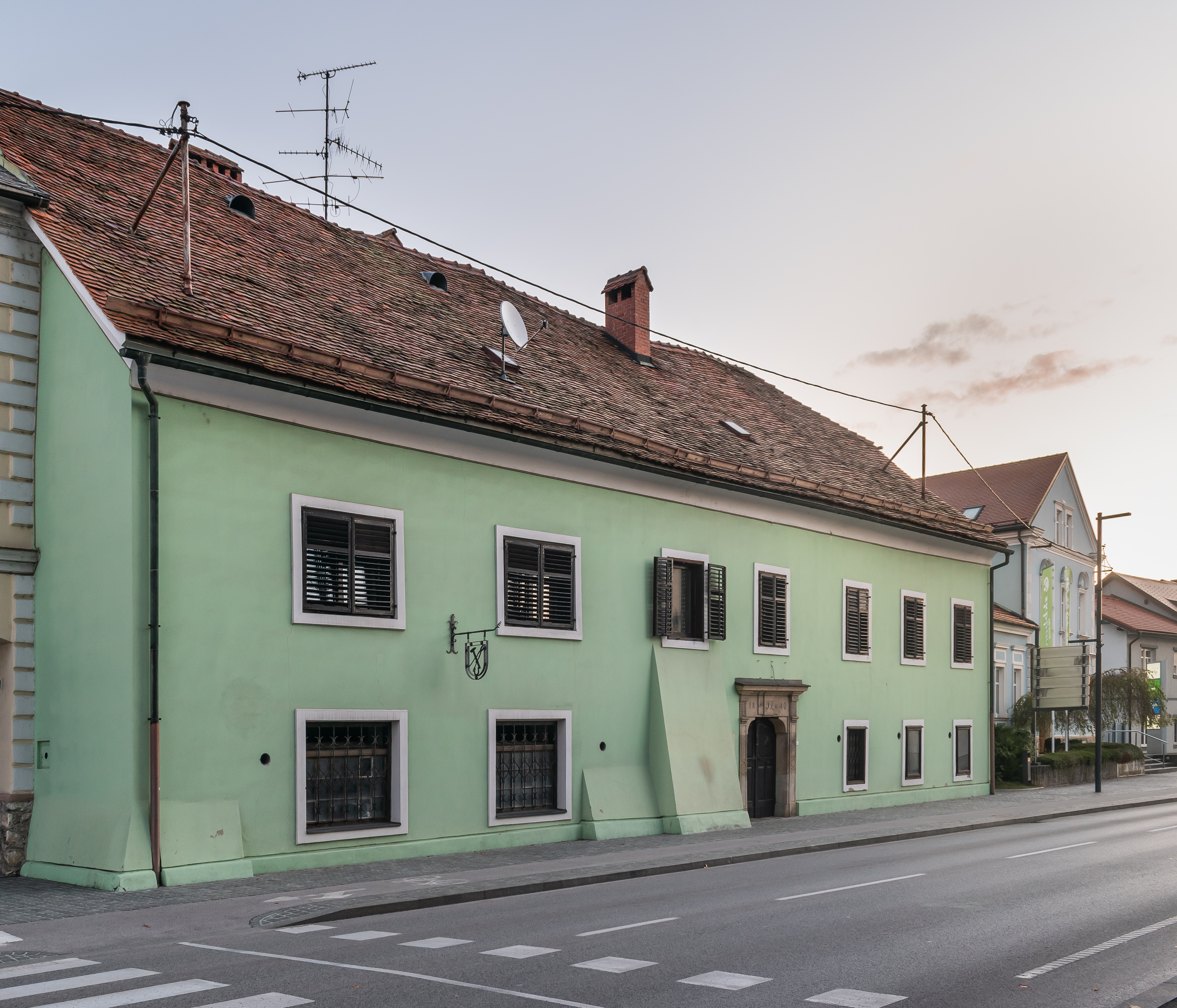
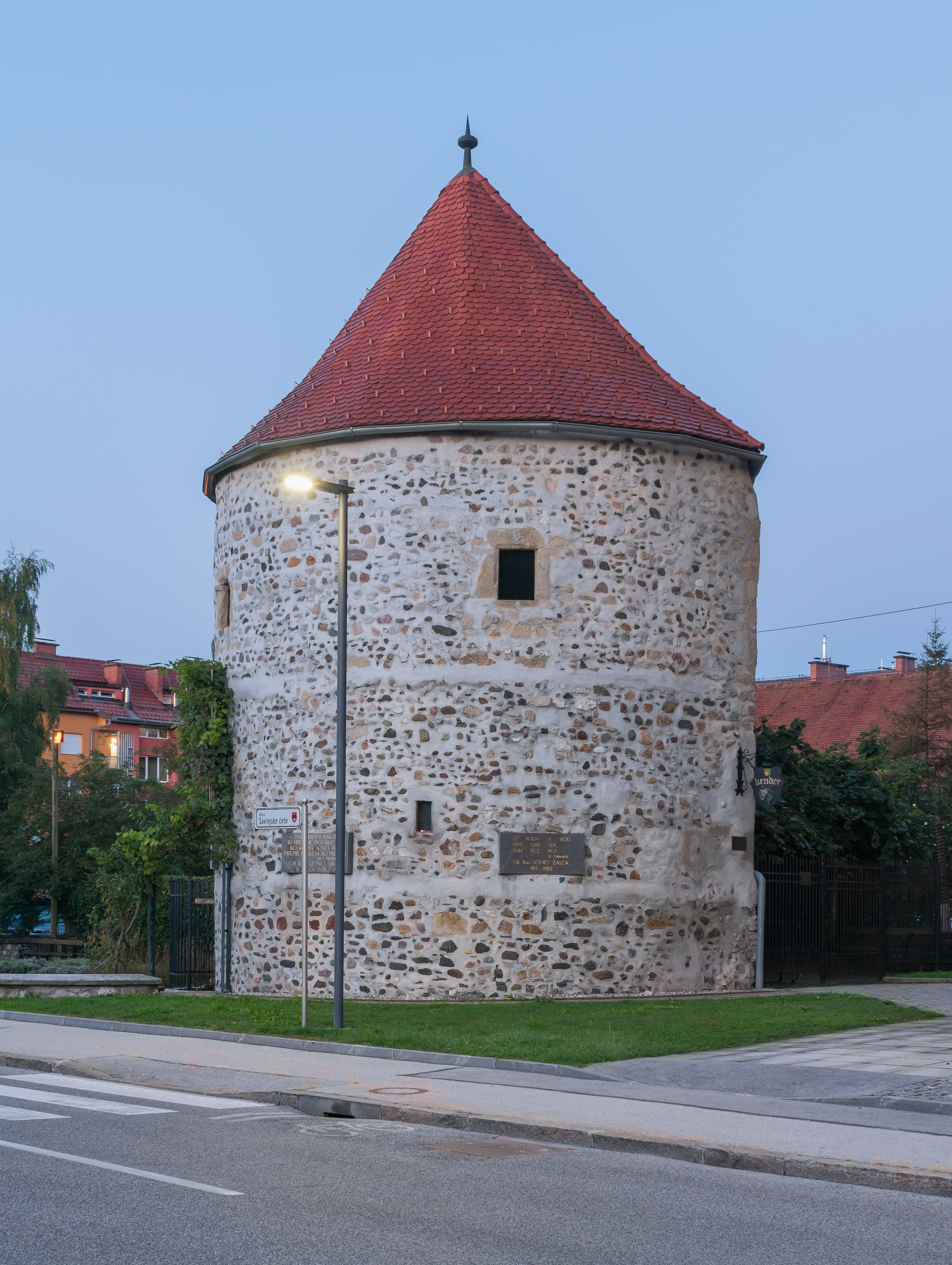
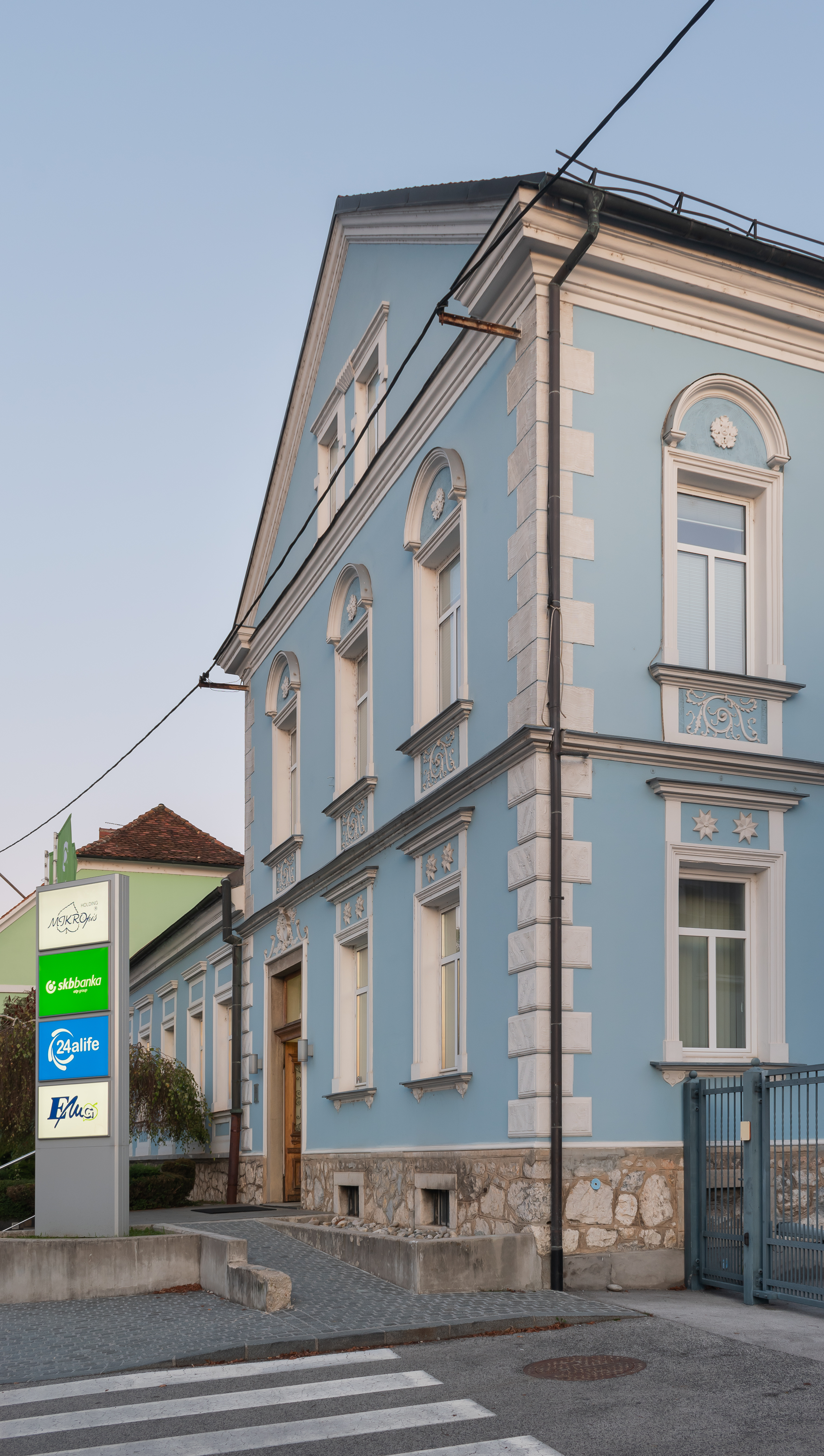
- From top, left to right: St. Nicholas' Church, Former Presbytery, Zotel Forge, Defense Tower, Pikl House

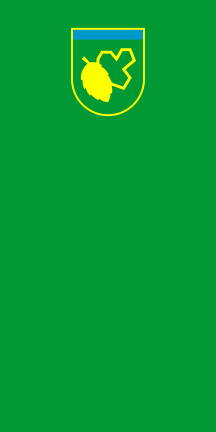
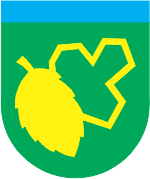
- Flag Coat of arms

- Location in Slovenia
- Coordinates: 46°15′3.59″N 15°9′50.18″E
- Country: Slovenia
- Traditional region: Styria
- Statistical region: Savinja
- Municipality: Žalec

Area
  - Total: 3.0 km^{2} (1.2 sq mi)
- Elevation: 255.3 m (838 ft)

Population (2013)
  - Total: 4,878
- Vehicle registration: CE

Žalec (pronounced [ˈʒàːləts]; German: Sachsenfeld) is a town in central Slovenia. It is the seat of the Municipality of Žalec. It lies in the valley of the lower course of the Savinja River west of Celje. The primary economic activity of the region is growing hops, which is reflected by the city's coat-of-arms. The area is part of the traditional region of Styria. The municipality is now included in the Savinja Statistical Region.

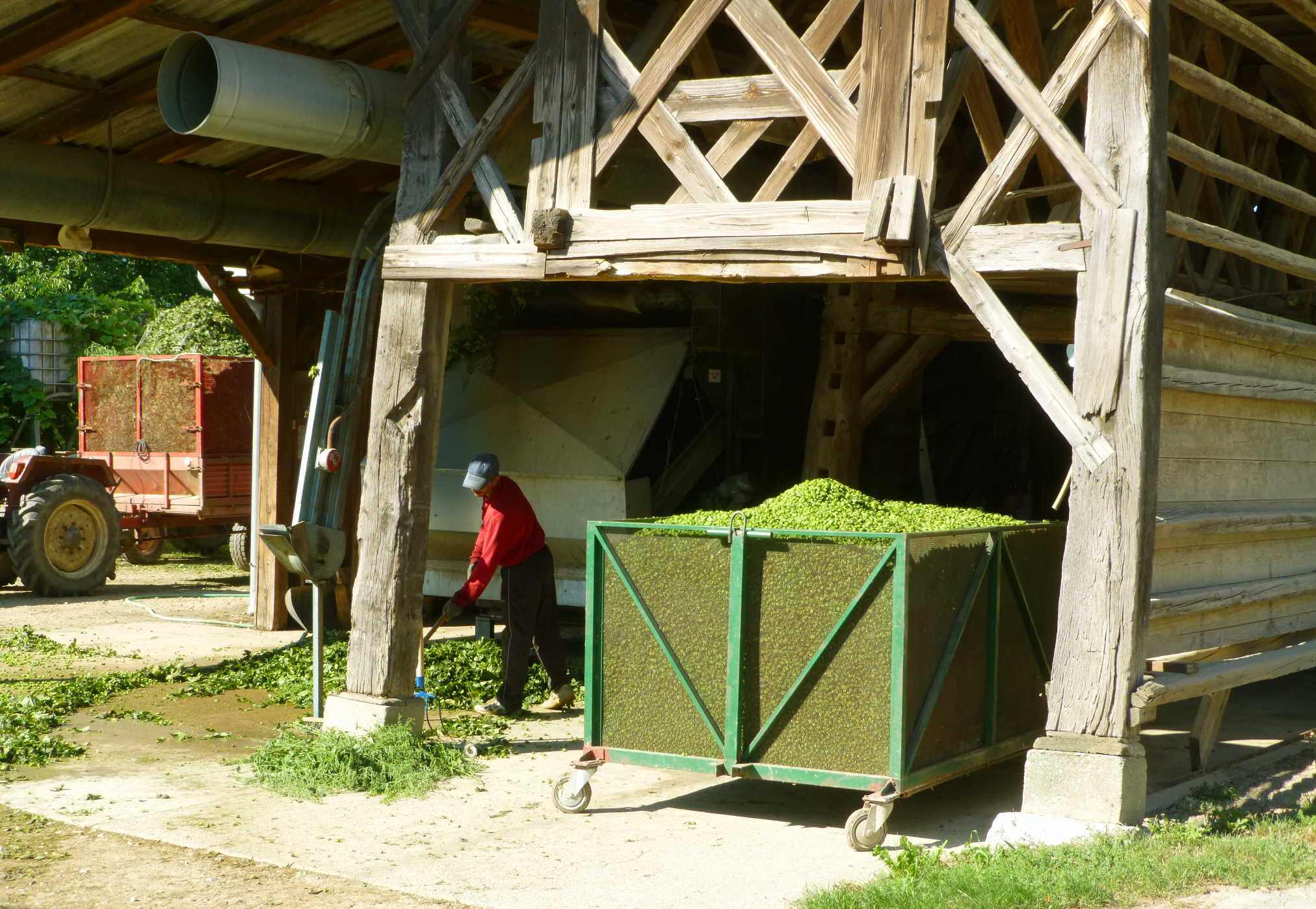
Harvesting hops at the end of August in Žalec

== Name ==
Žalec was attested in written sources as Saxenburc and Sachsenwelde in 1182 (and as Saschenvelde in 1232 and Sachsenfelde in 1256). The medieval German names are based on folk etymology from the Slovene name, probably the genitive of the plural form *Žalci. This in turn was based on the personal name *Zal and would mean 'descendants of Žal'. In modern German the settlement was known as Sachsenfeld.

== History ==
In 2022, torrential rains caused a landslide near an apartment building, which firefighters responded to.

== Tourist attractions ==
The Green Gold Beer Fountain (Slovene: Fontana piv "Zeleno zlato") was opened in Žalec in 2016.

== Church ==
The parish church in the settlement is dedicated to Saint Nicholas and belongs to the Roman Catholic Diocese of Celje. It was built between 1903 and 1906 on the site of a 16th-century church. The 16th-century building had a walled enclosure to protect the locals against Ottoman raids. A round tower from this enclosure still stands next to the church.

Historical population
Year	Pop.	±%
1948	1,279	—
1953	1,534	+19.9%
1961	1,874	+22.2%
1971	2,762	+47.4%
1981	4,561	+65.1%
1991	5,381	+18.0%
2002	4,919	−8.6%
2011	4,943	+0.5%
2021	4,983	+0.8%
Population size may be affected by changes in administrative divisions.
