= Šempeter v Savinjski Dolini =

Šempeter v Savinjski Dolini Sveti Peter v Savinjski dolini (until 1952)
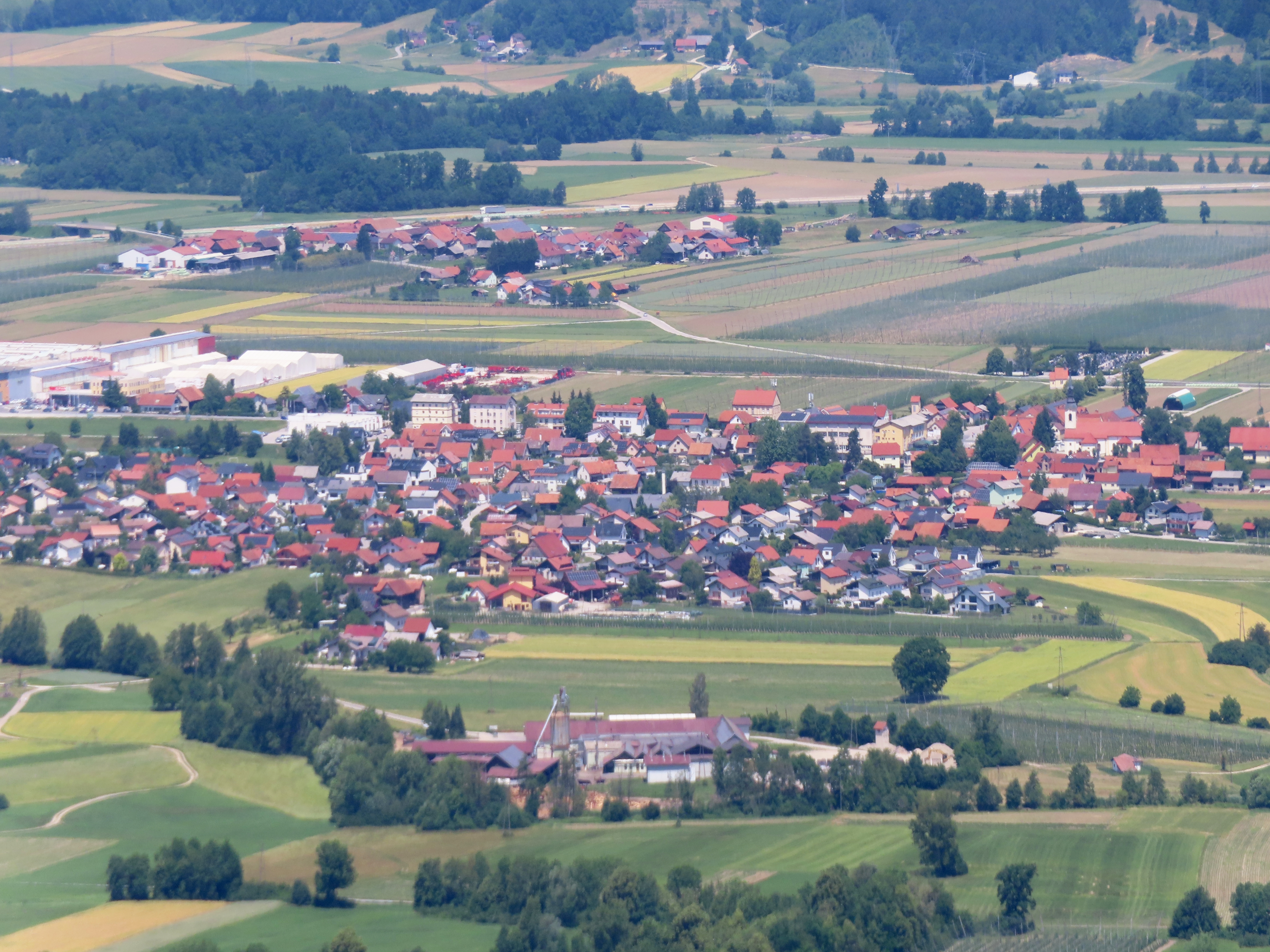

- Location in Slovenia
- Coordinates: 46°15′22.26″N 15°7′4.47″E
- Country: Slovenia
- Traditional region: Styria
- Statistical region: Savinja
- Municipality: Žalec

Area
  - Total: 4.11 km^{2} (1.59 sq mi)
- Elevation: 271 m (889 ft)

Population (2002)
  - Total: 1,943

Šempeter v Savinjski Dolini (pronounced [ʃɛmˈpeːtəɾ ʍ saˈʋiːnski dɔˈliːni], also [ʃɛmˈpɛːtəɾ ...] / [ʃəmˈpeːtəɾ ...] / [ʃəmˈpɛːtəɾ ...]; Slovene: Šempeter v Savinjski dolini; in older sources also Sveti Peter ob Savinji, German: Sankt Peter im Sannthale) is a village in the Municipality of Žalec in east-central Slovenia. It lies on the left bank of the Savinja River east of Žalec. The Slovenian A1 motorway crosses the territory of the settlement northwest of the village core. The area is part of the traditional region of Styria. The entire municipality of Žalec is now included in the Savinja Statistical Region.

== Name ==
The name of the settlement was changed from Sveti Peter v Savinjski dolini (literally, 'Saint Peter in the Savinja Valley') to Šempeter v Savinjski dolini in 1952. The name was changed on the basis of the 1948 Law on Names of Settlements and Designations of Squares, Streets, and Buildings as part of efforts by Slovenia's postwar communist government to remove religious elements from toponyms.

== Landmarks ==
=== Church ===
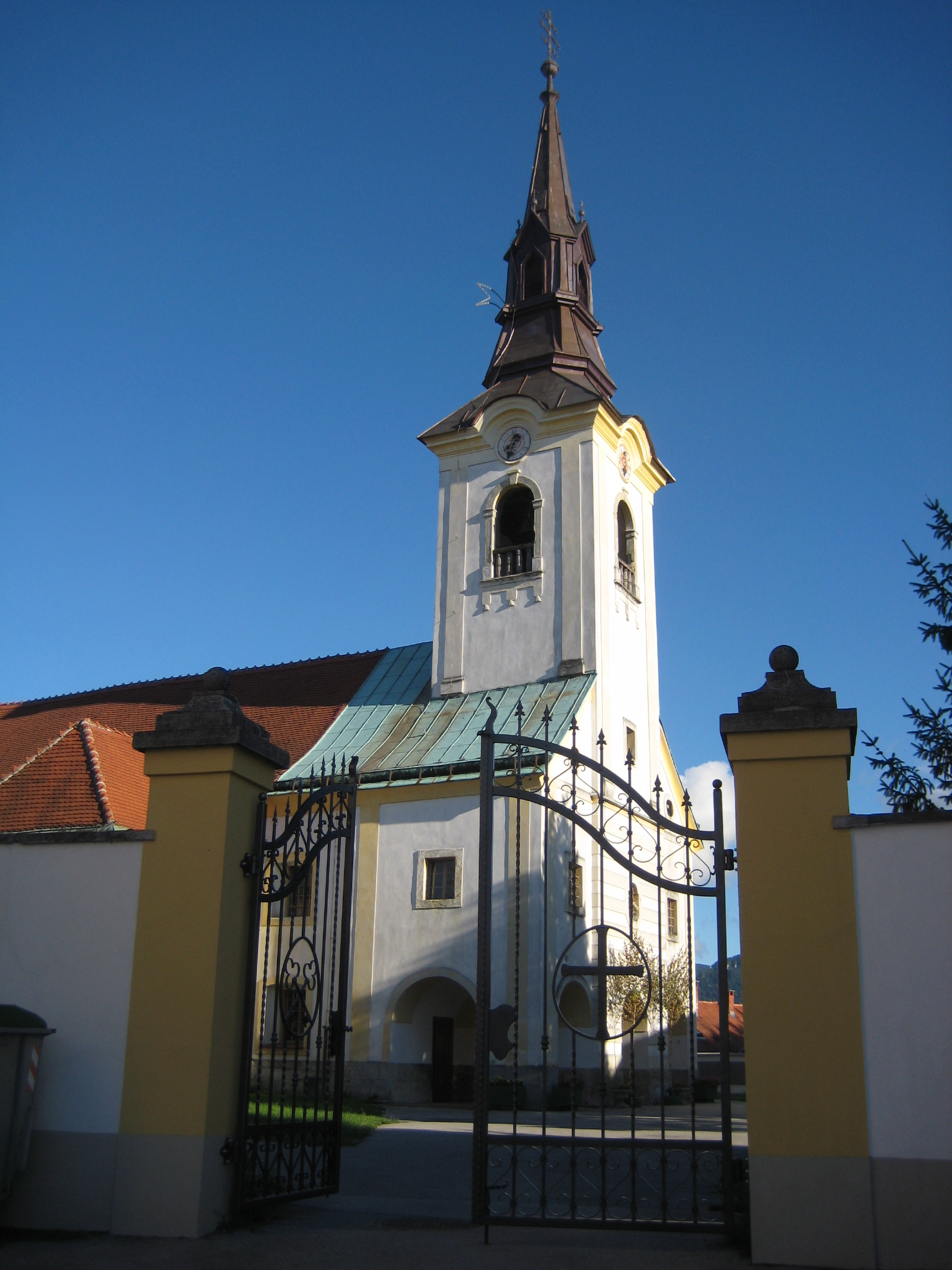
St. Peter's Parish Church

The local parish church from which the settlement gets its name is dedicated to Saint Peter and belongs to the Roman Catholic Diocese of Celje. It is built on the eastern edge of the village and was originally a 13th-century Romanesque church that was partially rebuilt in the Gothic and Baroque periods and most recently in 1913. It contains a statue of Mary dated to 1320. Most of rest of the church furnishing dates to the 18th, 19th, and 20th centuries.

=== Necropolis ===
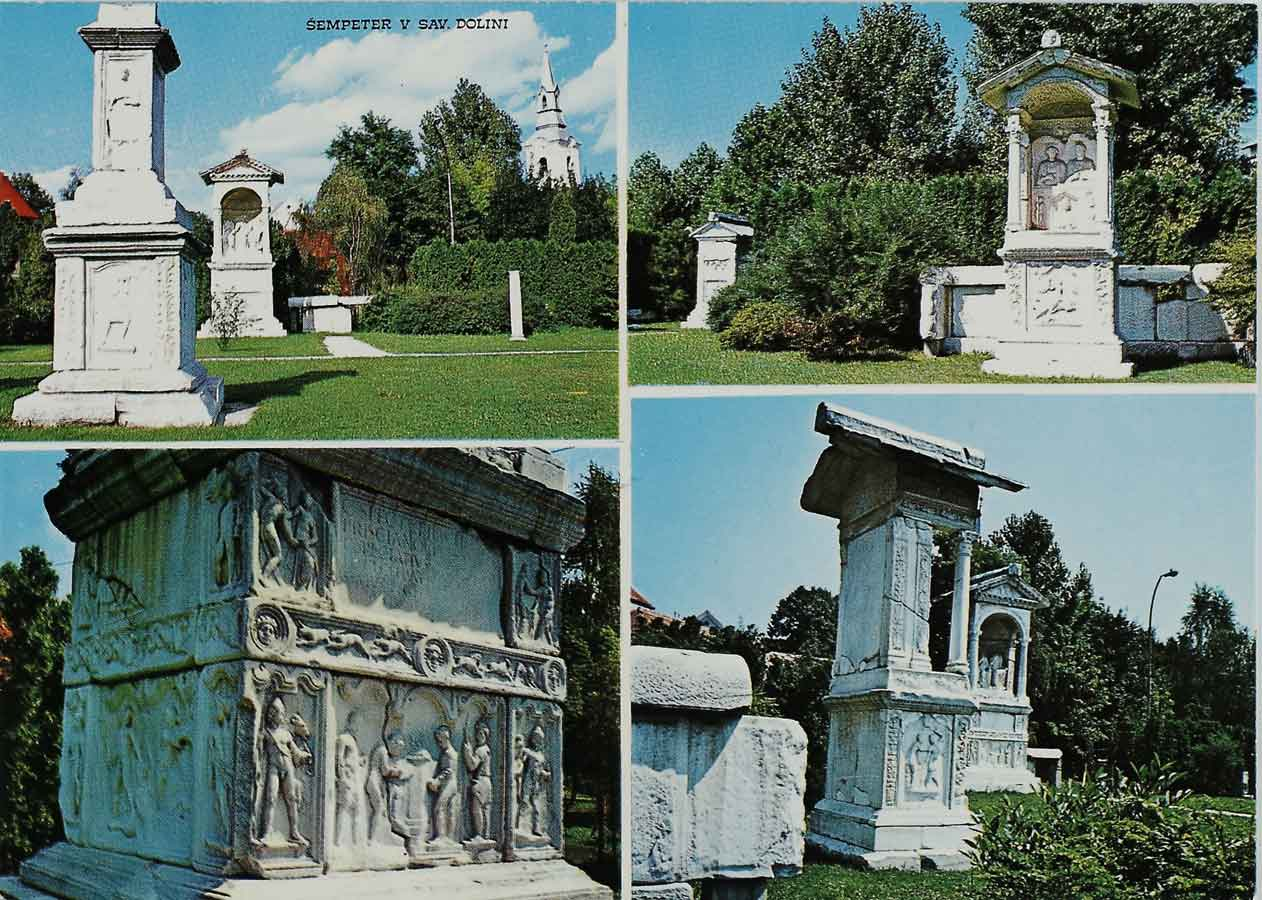
Ancient necropolis in Šempeter

Šempeter is best known for its ancient necropolis. The Roman road from Aquilea to Poetovio (via Emona and Celeia) ran through the area, and the location at Šempeter is in line with the Roman custom of burial grounds near main roads outside their cities. It was used between the 1st and 3rd centuries AD and is associated with the nearby Roman town of Celeia. At some point in antiquity the area was flooded and covered with gravel from the Savinja River, thus preserving the site until it was discovered by chance in 1952, when a statue of a seated woman was found when digging up an orchard. The site was excavated between 1952 and 1956 and again in 1964, when a further section of the necropolis was uncovered. Some graves have aediculae with sculptures and reliefs that are displayed in situ in the archaeological park under the auspices of the Celje regional museum. Some of the reliefs depict myths associated with resurrection, such as the story of Hercules rescuing Alcestis or the story of Orpheus and Eurydice. A number of grave goods were also excavated. The smaller finds are kept at the museum in Celje. The full extent of the site has not been investigated because parts of the burial ground extend under the present-day settlement.
