= Celje (National Assembly constituency) =

Constituency in Slovenia

- Constituency for the National Assembly
- Location of Celje within Slovenia
- Municipality: List: Braslovče; Celje; Črna na Koroškem; Dobje; Dobrna; Dravograd; Gornji Grad; Ljubno; Luče; Mežica; Mislinja; Mozirje; Muta; Nazarje; Podvelka; Polzela; Prebold; Prevalje; Radlje ob Dravi; Ravne na Koroškem; Rečica ob Savinji; Ribnica na Pohorju; Šentjur; Slovenj Gradec; Šmartno ob Paki; Solčava; Šoštanj; Štore; Tabor; Velenje; Vojnik; Vransko; Vuzenica; Žalec
- Population: 263,825 (2025)
- Electorate: 210,611 (2026)
- Area: 2,555 km^{2} (2024)

Current Constituency
- Created: 1992
- Seats: 11 (1992–present)
- Deputies: List: Jelka Godec (SDS); Jožef Jelen (SDS); Andreja Katič (SD); Manja Lesnik (SDS); Damjan Muzel (SDS); Metka Pešl Šater (Svoboda); Robert Potnik (D); Aleksander Reberšek (NSi); Janja Sluga (Svoboda); Dušan Stojanovič (Svoboda); Aleksander Štorek (Resni.ca)
- Electoral districts: List: Celje 1; Celje 2; Mozirje; Radlje; Ravne na Koroškem; Šentjur; Slovenj Gradec; Velenje 1; Velenje 2; Žalec 1; Žalec 2

Celje, officially known as the 5th constituency (Slovene: 5. volilna enota), is one of the eight multi-member constituencies (electoral units) of the National Assembly, the national legislature of Slovenia. The constituency was established in 1992 following Slovenia's independence from Yugoslavia. It consists of the municipalities of Braslovče, Celje, Črna na Koroškem, Dobje, Dobrna, Dravograd, Gornji Grad, Ljubno, Luče, Mežica, Mislinja, Mozirje, Muta, Nazarje, Podvelka, Polzela, Prebold, Prevalje, Radlje ob Dravi, Ravne na Koroškem, Rečica ob Savinji, Ribnica na Pohorju, Šentjur, Slovenj Gradec, Šmartno ob Paki, Solčava, Šoštanj, Štore, Tabor, Velenje, Vojnik, Vransko, Vuzenica and Žalec. The constituency currently elects 11 of the 90 members of the National Assembly using the open party-list proportional representation electoral system. At the 2026 parliamentary election the constituency had 210,611 registered electors.

== History ==
The 5th constituency (Celje) was one of the eight constituencies established by the Determination of Constituencies for the Election of Deputies to the National Assembly Act (ZDVEDZ) (Zakon o določitvi volilnih enot za volitve poslancev v državni zbor (ZDVEDZ)) passed by the Assembly of the Republic of Slovenia (Skupščina Republike Slovenije) in September 1992. It consisted of the municipalities of Celje, Dravograd, Mozirje, Radlje ob Dravi, Ravne na Koroškem, Šentjur pri Celju, Slovenj Gradec, Velenje and Žalec.

Following the re-organisation of municipalities in October 1994, parts of Celje municipality were transferred to the newly created municipalities of Štore and Vojnik; parts of Mozirje municipality were transferred to the newly created municipalities of Gornji Grad, Ljubno, Luče and Nazarje; parts of Radlje ob Dravi municipality were transferred to the newly created municipalities of Muta, Podvelka–Ribnica and Vuzenica; parts of Ravne na Koroškem municipality was split into the newly created municipalities of Črna na Koroškem, Mežica and Ravne–Prevalje; parts of Slovenj Gradec municipality were transferred to the newly created Mislinja municipality; and parts of Velenje municipality were transferred to the newly created municipalities of Šmartno ob Paki and Šoštanj.

In August 1998 parts of Vojnik municipality were transferred to the newly created Dobrna municipality; parts of Luče municipality were transferred to the newly created Solčava municipality; parts of Podvelka–Ribnica municipality were transferred to the newly created Ribnica na Pohorju municipality whilst Podvelka–Ribnica was renamed Podvelka; parts of Ravne–Prevalje municipality were transferred to the newly created Prevalje municipality whilst Ravne–Prevalje was renamed Ravne na Koroškem; parts of Šentjur pri Celju municipality were transferred to the newly created Dobje municipality; and parts of Žalec municipality were transferred to the newly created municipalities of Braslovče, Polzela, Prebold, Tabor and Vransko. Šentjur pri Celju municipality was renamed Šentjur in June 2002. Rečica ob Savinji municipality was created from parts of Mozirje municipality in June 2006.

In February 2021 the National Assembly passed Amendments and Supplements to the Determination of Constituencies for the Election of Deputies to the National Assembly Act (ZDVEDZ-B) (Zakon o spremembah in dopolnitvah Zakona o določitvi volilnih enot za volitve poslancev v državni zbor (ZDVEDZ-B)) which defined the Celje constituency as consisting of the municipalities of Braslovče, Celje, Črna na Koroškem, Dobje, Dobrna, Dravograd, Gornji Grad, Ljubno, Luče, Mežica, Mislinja, Mozirje, Muta, Nazarje, Podvelka, Polzela, Prebold, Prevalje, Radlje ob Dravi, Ravne na Koroškem, Rečica ob Savinji, Ribnica na Pohorju, Šentjur, Slovenj Gradec, Šmartno ob Paki, Solčava, Šoštanj, Štore, Tabor, Velenje, Vojnik, Vransko, Vuzenica and Žalec.

== Electoral system ==
Celje currently elects 11 of the 90 members of the National Assembly using the open party-list proportional representation electoral system. Each constituency is divided into 11 electoral districts (volilni okraji) in which each party stands a single candidate. Electors vote for a candidate of their choice in their electoral district and then the votes received by each party's candidates are aggregated at the constituency level.

Allocation of seats was carried out in two stages. In the first stage, seats are allocated to parties at the constituency level using the Droop quota (Hare quota prior to 2006). In the second stage, unallocated seats from the first stage are aggregated at the national level and allocated to parties using the D'Hondt method (any seats won by the party at the constituency level are subtracted from the party's national seats). Though calculated nationally, national seats are allocated at the constituency level.

Since 2000, only parties that reach the 4% national threshold compete for seats at both constituency and national levels. Prior to this there was no threshold at the constituency level but parties needed to reach 3/88 (c3.4%) to compete for seats at the national level.

Seats won by each party in a constituency are allocated to the candidates with the highest percentage of votes. As a consequence, multiple candidates may be elected from an electoral district whilst others may have no candidates elected. Prior to 2000 parties had the option to have up to 50% of their national seats allocated in the order they appear on their party list (closed list).

== Electoral districts ==
Celje is divided into 11 electoral districts:

- 1. Šentjur - municipalities of Dobje and Šentjur.
- 2. Celje 1 - municipalities of Celje (except Košnica pri Celju, Medlog, Osenca, Pečovnik, Tremerje, Trnovlje pri Celju, Zvodno and parts of Celje), Dobrna, Štore and Vojnik.
- 3. Celje 2 - municipality of Celje (Košnica pri Celju, Medlog, Osenca, Pečovnik, Tremerje, Trnovlje pri Celju, Zvodno and parts of Celje only).
- 4. Žalec 1 - municipalities of Polzela, Velenje (Črnova, Janškovo selo, Lipje, Lopatnik, Pirešica, Prelska and Vinska Gora only) and Žalec (except Arja vas, Brnica, Dobriša vas, Drešinja vas, Griže, Kasaze, Levec, Liboje, Mala Pirešica, Migojnice, Novo Celje, Petrovče, Pongrac, Ruše, Zabukovica and Zaloška Gorica)
- 5. Žalec 2 - municipalities of Braslovče, Prebold, Tabor, Vransko and Žalec (Arja vas, Brnica, Dobriša vas, Drešinja vas, Griže, Kasaze, Levec, Liboje, Mala Pirešica, Migojnice, Novo Celje, Petrovče, Pongrac, Ruše, Zabukovica and Zaloška Gorica only).
- 6. Mozirje - municipalities of Gornji Grad, Ljubno, Luče, Mozirje, Nazarje, Rečica ob Savinji and Solčava.
- 7. Velenje 1 - municipality of Velenje (except Črnova, Janškovo selo, Kavče, Lipje, Lopatnik, Pirešica, Plešivec, Podgorje, Podkraj pri Velenju, Prelska, Vinska Gora and parts of Velenje).
- 8. Velenje 2 - municipalities of Šmartno ob Paki, Šoštanj and Velenje (Kavče, Plešivec, Podgorje, Podkraj pri Velenju and parts of Velenje only).
- 9. Slovenj Gradec - municipalities of Mislinja and Slovenj Gradec.
- 10. Ravne na Koroškem - municipalities of Črna na Koroškem, Mežica, Prevalje and Ravne na Koroškem.
- 11. Radlje - municipalities of Dravograd, Muta, Podvelka, Ribnica na Pohorju, Radlje ob Dravi and Vuzenica.

== Election results ==
=== Summary ===
Election	Left Levica / ZL / TRS			Social Democrats SD / ZLSD / ZL			Freedom Movement Svoboda			Positive Slovenia PS / LZJ-PS			Liberal Democracy LDS			Let's Connect PoS / SMC			Slovenian People's SLS / SLS-SKD / SLS-SMS			Christian Democrats SKD			New Slovenia NSi			Slovenian Democrats SDS / SDSS			Slovenian Nationalists SNS		
Election	Votes	%	Seats	Votes	%	Seats	Votes	%	Seats	Votes	%	Seats	Votes	%	Seats	Votes	%	Seats	Votes	%	Seats	Votes	%	Seats	Votes	%	Seats	Votes	%	Seats	Votes	%	Seats
2026	6,291	4.18%	0	11,454	7.62%	0	39,725	26.42%	3										with NSi						15,569	10.35%	1	46,977	31.24%	3	3,765	2.50%	0
2022	4,786	3.18%	0	12,307	8.18%	0	46,410	30.85%	3							4,728	3.14%	0	with PoS						11,026	7.33%	0	41,017	27.27%	3	2,834	1.88%	0
2018	8,178	7.11%	0	13,251	11.53%	1										10,381	9.03%	1	2,997	2.61%	0				6,868	5.97%	0	33,115	28.81%	3	5,828	5.07%	0
2014	5,449	4.92%	0	7,019	6.33%	0				2,554	2.30%	0				37,868	34.17%	4	4,558	4.11%	0				4,990	4.50%	0	23,335	21.06%	2	2,365	2.13%	0
2011	2,127	1.53%	0	13,662	9.80%	1				32,058	23.00%	2	1,981	1.42%	0				11,589	8.31%	0				5,168	3.71%	0	41,289	29.62%	3	2,970	2.13%	0
2008				35,840	26.65%	3							5,156	3.83%	0				9,954	7.40%	0	471	0.35%	0	3,276	2.44%	0	40,833	30.36%	3	8,774	6.52%	0
2004				12,503	10.00%	1							26,348	21.06%	2				7,909	6.32%	0				9,070	7.25%	0	39,477	31.56%	3	10,826	8.65%	1
2000				14,777	10.79%	1							50,029	36.53%	4				14,394	10.51%	1	with SLS			9,438	6.89%	0	21,354	15.59%	1	6,945	5.07%	0
1996				8,963	6.51%	0							38,784	28.17%	3				26,062	18.93%	2	12,839	9.32%	1				24,779	18.00%	1	3,689	2.68%	0
1992				18,539	12.21%	1							45,691	30.10%	3				12,396	8.17%	0	19,359	12.75%	1				4,089	2.69%	0	12,960	8.54%	0

(Excludes national seats. Figures in italics represent alliances/joint lists.)

=== Detailed ===
Party has received at least 4% of the vote nationally (since 2000).

==== 2020s ====
===== 2026 =====
Results of the 2026 parliamentary election held on 22 March 2026:

Party		Votes per electoral district											Total votes	%	Seats		
Party		Celje 1	Celje 2	Mozirje	Radlje	Ravne na Koroš- kem	Šentjur	Slovenj Gradec	Velenje 1	Velenje 2	Žalec 1	Žalec 2	Total votes	%	Con.	Nat.	Tot.
Slovenian Democratic Party	SDS	7,052	3,564	3,709	4,481	4,106	5,269	3,743	3,039	4,358	4,242	3,414	46,977	31.24%	3	1	4
Freedom Movement	Svoboda	5,178	4,357	1,911	4,197	4,636	2,470	4,569	3,025	2,781	3,174	3,427	39,725	26.42%	3	0	3
New Slovenia – Christian Democrats, Slovenian People's Party and Focus	NSi-SLS- FOKUS	1,888	809	1,895	954	1,520	1,205	1,124	665	981	1,386	3,142	15,569	10.35%	1	0	1
Social Democrats	SD	1,334	1,064	350	682	1,331	834	863	1,377	1,028	1,395	1,196	11,454	7.62%	0	1	1
Democrats	D	1,484	940	690	1,567	581	756	889	653	879	943	852	10,234	6.81%	0	1	1
Resni.ca	Resni.ca	1,234	832	498	819	570	613	655	620	599	634	645	7,719	5.13%	0	1	1
The Left and Vesna – Green Party	Levica-Vesna	842	990	562	421	645	358	540	488	441	484	520	6,291	4.18%	0	0	0
Slovenian National Party	SNS	748	418	218	273	245	317	312	210	424	359	241	3,765	2.50%	0	0	0
Prerod	Prerod	554	363	166	264	212	351	300	235	336	297	309	3,387	2.25%	0	0	0
Pirate Party	Pirati	430	373	131	249	242	190	262	195	202	287	272	2,833	1.88%	0	0	0
Greens of Slovenia and Party of Generations	ZS-SG	47	62	25	45	64	55	101	86	66	47	56	654	0.43%	0	0	0
Voice of Pensioners	GU	96	69	19	54	34	22	33	38	35	35	30	465	0.31%	0	0	0
We, Socialists!	MI!	57	82	19	32	50	27	42	37	35	42	37	460	0.31%	0	0	0
Alternative for Slovenia	AzaS	69	51	42	24	32	36	30	24	25	48	43	424	0.28%	0	0	0
Karl Erjavec - Trust Party	SZ	43	28	23	16	18	20	17	22	24	34	16	261	0.17%	0	0	0
Solution – Party of Pensioners Velenje	SUS	17	21	6	16	12	5	7	27	38	6	9	164	0.11%	0	0	0
Valid votes		21,073	14,023	10,264	14,094	14,298	12,528	13,487	10,741	12,252	13,413	14,209	150,382	100.00%	7	4	11
Rejected votes		196	110	55	169	147	102	112	110	103	138	140	1,382	0.91%			
Total polled		21,269	14,133	10,319	14,263	14,445	12,630	13,599	10,851	12,355	13,551	14,349	151,764	72.06%			
Registered electors		29,519	21,242	13,537	20,289	20,469	17,130	17,967	16,034	17,200	18,306	18,918	210,611				
Turnout		72.05%	66.53%	76.23%	70.30%	70.57%	73.73%	75.69%	67.67%	71.83%	74.02%	75.85%	72.06%				

The following candidates were elected:

- Constituency seats - Jelka Godec (SDS, Šentjur), 5,269 votes; Jožef Jelen (SDS, Mozirje), 3,709 votes; Manja Lesnik (SDS, Velenje 2), 4,358 votes; Metka Pešl Šater (Svoboda Ravne na Koroškem), 4,636 votes; Aleksander Reberšek (NSi-SLS-FOKUS, Žalec 2), 3,142 votes; Janja Sluga (Svoboda, Celje 2), 4,357 votes; and Dušan Stojanovič (Svoboda, Slovenj Gradec), 4,569 votes.
- National seats - Andreja Katič (SD, Velenje 1), 1,377 votes; Damjan Muzel (SDS, Celje 1), 7,052 votes; Robert Potnik (D, Radlje), 1,567 votes; and Aleksander Štorek (Resni.ca, Celje 2), 832 votes.

===== 2022 =====
Results of the 2022 parliamentary election held on 24 April 2022:

Party		Votes per electoral district											Total votes	%	Seats		
Party		Celje 1	Celje 2	Mozirje	Radlje	Ravne na Koroš- kem	Šentjur	Slovenj Gradec	Velenje 1	Velenje 2	Žalec 1	Žalec 2	Total votes	%	Con.	Nat.	Tot.
Freedom Movement	Svoboda	6,684	5,521	2,553	4,333	4,324	3,167	5,100	3,203	3,016	4,143	4,366	46,410	30.85%	3	2	5
Slovenian Democratic Party	SDS	5,865	3,027	3,249	4,030	3,884	4,339	3,338	2,801	3,806	3,391	3,287	41,017	27.27%	3	1	4
Social Democrats	SD	1,151	982	349	1,104	2,894	588	834	1,618	1,090	750	947	12,307	8.18%	0	1	1
New Slovenia – Christian Democrats	NSi	1,198	577	1,158	1,010	922	799	707	456	784	1,399	2,016	11,026	7.33%	0	1	1
The Left	Levica	653	814	238	367	484	242	465	355	366	376	426	4,786	3.18%	0	0	0
Resni.ca		729	487	450	410	356	341	309	438	440	374	422	4,756	3.16%	0	0	0
Let's Connect Slovenia	PoS	867	518	450	233	214	598	485	211	441	416	295	4,728	3.14%	0	0	0
List of Marjan Šarec	LMŠ	633	448	276	669	358	345	546	257	391	333	466	4,722	3.14%	0	0	0
Party of Alenka Bratušek	SAB	438	408	145	227	302	247	266	321	378	377	324	3,433	2.28%	0	0	0
Slovenian National Party	SNS	447	241	177	218	218	362	179	170	300	285	237	2,834	1.88%	0	0	0
Our Future and Good Country	SNP-DD	428	413	126	231	185	172	154	244	211	197	213	2,574	1.71%	0	0	0
Our Country		240	104	159	596	162	239	288	141	237	223	155	2,544	1.69%	0	0	0
Pirate Party		338	262	112	182	180	154	209	150	177	192	213	2,169	1.44%	0	0	0
Vesna – Green Party		293	291	338	103	131	123	112	182	154	194	201	2,122	1.41%	0	0	0
For a Healthy Society	ZSi	296	240	158	251	130	151	166	160	137	192	205	2,086	1.39%	0	0	0
For the People of Slovenia	ZLS	189	174	60	109	37	131	49	61	77	154	156	1,197	0.80%	0	0	0
Democratic Party of Pensioners of Slovenia	DeSUS	140	103	57	96	58	122	100	61	62	100	103	1,002	0.67%	0	0	0
List of Boris Popovič – Let's Digitize Slovenia	LBP	68	55	28	39	35	22	22	86	62	41	43	501	0.33%	0	0	0
Homeland League	DOM	35	28	12	8	22	17	17	20	20	14	25	218	0.14%	0	0	0
Valid votes		20,692	14,693	10,095	14,216	14,896	12,159	13,346	10,935	12,149	13,151	14,100	150,432	100.00%	6	5	11
Rejected votes		209	115	79	146	151	92	106	95	114	115	138	1,360	0.90%			
Total polled		20,901	14,808	10,174	14,362	15,047	12,251	13,452	11,030	12,263	13,266	14,238	151,792	71.61%			
Registered electors		29,422	21,855	13,700	20,624	20,947	17,077	17,943	16,320	17,459	18,004	18,630	211,981				
Turnout		71.04%	67.76%	74.26%	69.64%	71.83%	71.74%	74.97%	67.59%	70.24%	73.68%	76.43%	71.61%				

The following candidates were elected:

- Constituency seats - Jelka Godec (SDS, Šentjur), 4,339 votes; Jožef Jelen (SDS, Mozirje), 3,249 votes; Miha Lamut (Svoboda, Celje 1), 6,684 votes; Franc Rosec (SDS, Velenje 2), 3,806 votes; Janja Sluga (Svoboda, Celje 2), 5,521 votes; and Dušan Stojanovič (Svoboda, Slovenj Gradec), 5,100 votes.
- National seats - Alenka Helbl (SDS, Radlje), 4,030 votes; Jani Prednik (SD, Ravne na Koroškem), 2,894 votes; Dean Premik (Svoboda, Žalec 2), 4,366 votes; Aleksander Reberšek (NSi, Žalec 2), 2,016 votes; and Aleš Rezar (Svoboda, Žalec 1), 4,143 votes.

Substitutions:

- Jani Prednik (SD, Ravne na Koroškem) resigned on 20 October 2025 and was replaced by Janja Rednjak ((SD, Velenje 2) on 3 November 2025.

==== 2010s ====
===== 2018 =====
Results of the 2018 parliamentary election held on 3 June 2018:

Party		Votes per electoral district											Total votes	%	Seats		
Party		Celje 1	Celje 2	Mozirje	Radlje ob Dravi	Ravne na Koroš- kem	Šentjur pri Celju	Slovenj Gradec	Velenje 1	Velenje 2	Žalec 1	Žalec 2	Total votes	%	Con.	Nat.	Tot.
Slovenian Democratic Party	SDS	4,349	2,596	2,643	3,016	3,588	3,075	2,639	2,108	3,108	3,029	2,964	33,115	28.81%	3	0	3
List of Marjan Šarec	LMŠ	1,808	1,273	1,384	1,421	985	961	1,471	996	1,155	1,178	1,482	14,114	12.28%	1	1	2
Social Democrats	SD	1,101	1,030	370	1,794	2,565	447	1,448	1,595	1,245	788	868	13,251	11.53%	1	0	1
Modern Centre Party	SMC	1,484	1,294	503	833	1,112	976	1,098	726	671	870	814	10,381	9.03%	1	0	1
The Left	Levica	1,159	1,343	467	574	805	434	876	714	530	592	684	8,178	7.11%	0	1	1
New Slovenia – Christian Democrats	NSi	973	504	755	543	584	454	502	363	626	488	1,076	6,868	5.97%	0	1	1
Democratic Party of Pensioners of Slovenia	DeSUS	751	642	336	632	528	635	440	524	461	693	754	6,396	5.56%	0	1	1
Slovenian National Party	SNS	869	614	326	577	523	522	467	377	448	548	557	5,828	5.07%	0	1	1
Party of Alenka Bratušek	SAB	682	715	292	315	379	270	463	399	316	668	573	5,072	4.41%	0	0	0
Slovenian People's Party	SLS	557	343	274	121	87	389	238	140	185	369	294	2,997	2.61%	0	0	0
Pirate Party		311	320	124	131	113	97	192	187	160	232	197	2,064	1.80%	0	0	0
Good Country	DD	222	160	86	137	185	118	147	95	112	157	151	1,570	1.37%	0	0	0
Andrej Čuš and Greens of Slovenia	AČZS	180	106	37	93	58	164	76	61	68	72	100	1,015	0.88%	0	0	0
List of Journalist Bojan Požar	LNBP	164	123	54	46	50	41	39	132	133	73	68	923	0.80%	0	0	0
United Slovenia	ZSi	110	79	48	95	77	85	82	45	59	62	71	813	0.71%	0	0	0
Save Slovenia from Elite and Tycoons	ReSET	38	25	24	262	145	18	70	22	24	21	18	667	0.58%	0	0	0
For a Healthy Society	ZD	92	68	29	31	28	39	25	33	27	60	72	504	0.44%	0	0	0
Movement Together Forward	GSN	79	45	12	32	43	24	22	51	30	35	34	407	0.35%	0	0	0
Economic Active Party	GAS	26	28	5	14	29	12	8	21	24	24	46	237	0.21%	0	0	0
Solidarity–For a Fair Society!		30	33	6	15	8	15	11	24	23	13	23	201	0.17%	0	0	0
United Right		34	15	18	21	11	15	8	28	16	12	16	194	0.17%	0	0	0
Socialist Party of Slovenia	SPS	25	19	9	14	15	6	11	14	14	19	16	162	0.14%	0	0	0
Valid votes		15,044	11,375	7,802	10,717	11,918	8,797	10,333	8,655	9,435	10,003	10,878	114,957	100.00%	6	5	11
Rejected votes		224	142	77	109	95	100	116	87	120	121	114	1,305	1.12%			
Total polled		15,268	11,517	7,879	10,826	12,013	8,897	10,449	8,742	9,555	10,124	10,992	116,262	53.98%			
Registered electors		29,801	22,725	13,859	21,155	21,597	17,150	18,197	16,637	17,589	18,011	18,647	215,368				
Turnout		51.23%	50.68%	56.85%	51.17%	55.62%	51.88%	57.42%	52.55%	54.32%	56.21%	58.95%	53.98%				

The following candidates were elected:

- Constituency seats - Nada Brinovšek (SDS, Mozirje), 2,643 votes; Jelka Godec (SDS, Šentjur pri Celju), 3,075 votes; Darij Krajčič (LMŠ, Mozirje), 1,384 votes; Jani Prednik (SD, Ravne na Koroškem), 2,565 votes; Franc Rosec (SDS, Velenje 2), 3,108 votes; and Janja Sluga (SMC, Celje 2), 1,294 votes.
- National seats - Željko Cigler (Levica, Celje 2), 1,343 votes; Jani Ivanuša (SNS, Šentjur pri Celju), 522 votes; Jože Lenart (LMŠ, Slovenj Gradec), 1,471 votes; Robert Polnar (DeSUS, Šentjur pri Celju), 635 votes; and Aleksander Reberšek (NSi, Žalec 2), 1,076 votes.

Substitutions:

- Darij Krajčič (LMŠ, Mozirje) resigned on 4 March 2019 and was replaced by Nik Prebil (LMŠ, Žalec 2) on 5 March 2019.
- Jelka Godec (SDS, Šentjur pri Celju) forfeited her seat on 2 April 2020 upon being appointed to the government and was replaced by Ljubo Žnidar (SDS, Žalec 1) on the same day.
- Ljubo Žnidar (SDS, Žalec 1) resigned on 15 November 2021 and was replaced by Karmen Kozmus (SDS, Celje 1) on 16 November 2021.

===== 2014 =====
Results of the 2014 parliamentary election held on 13 July 2014:

Party		Votes per electoral district											Total votes	%	Seats		
Party		Celje 1	Celje 2	Mozirje	Dravo- grad- Radlje	Ravne na Koroš- kem	Šentjur	Slovenj Gradec	Velenje 1	Velenje 2	Žalec 1	Žalec 2	Total votes	%	Con.	Nat.	Tot.
Modern Centre Party	SMC	4,877	4,375	2,146	3,611	4,278	3,088	3,677	2,801	2,522	3,082	3,411	37,868	34.17%	4	1	5
Slovenian Democratic Party	SDS	3,161	1,979	2,043	2,123	2,168	2,139	1,654	1,521	2,145	2,316	2,086	23,335	21.06%	2	1	3
Democratic Party of Pensioners of Slovenia	DeSUS	1,836	1,571	742	1,680	1,437	896	1,233	1,186	1,235	1,624	1,413	14,853	13.40%	1	1	2
Social Democrats	SD	528	595	231	669	724	363	1,041	991	804	465	608	7,019	6.33%	0	1	1
United Left	ZL	810	740	355	510	456	339	485	480	476	418	380	5,449	4.92%	0	0	0
New Slovenia – Christian Democrats	NSi	684	321	492	435	471	380	414	282	439	339	733	4,990	4.50%	0	0	0
Slovenian People's Party	SLS	730	283	802	323	270	492	433	130	333	234	528	4,558	4.11%	0	0	0
Alliance of Alenka Bratušek	ZaAB	550	564	226	389	401	250	422	310	327	441	446	4,326	3.90%	0	0	0
Positive Slovenia	PS	316	378	109	138	282	89	199	391	290	205	157	2,554	2.30%	0	0	0
Slovenian National Party	SNS	356	197	154	247	213	189	184	136	237	233	219	2,365	2.13%	0	0	0
Pirate Party		243	215	0	0	140	0	142	131	127	167	150	1,315	1.19%	0	0	0
Verjamem		102	98	37	94	83	80	48	65	56	67	76	806	0.73%	0	0	0
Greens of Slovenia	ZS	85	83	36	49	51	71	27	25	33	66	50	576	0.52%	0	0	0
Civic List	DL	56	48	96	43	64	30	28	20	30	32	54	501	0.45%	0	0	0
Equal Land–Forward Slovenia	ED-NPS	41	35	25	36	23	33	13	19	9	29	34	297	0.27%	0	0	0
Valid votes		14,375	11,482	7,494	10,347	11,061	8,439	10,000	8,488	9,063	9,718	10,345	110,812	100.00%	7	4	11
Rejected votes		200	143	120	127	121	131	137	131	141	93	95	1,439	1.28%			
Total polled		14,575	11,625	7,614	10,474	11,182	8,570	10,137	8,619	9,204	9,811	10,440	112,251	51.97%			
Registered electors		29,571	23,153	13,907	21,337	21,892	17,097	18,243	16,759	17,651	17,893	18,509	216,012				
Turnout		49.29%	50.21%	54.75%	49.09%	51.08%	50.13%	55.57%	51.43%	52.14%	54.83%	56.40%	51.97%				

The following candidates were elected:

- Constituency seats - Nada Brinovšek (SDS, Mozirje), 2,043 votes; Karl Erjavec (DeSUS, Žalec 1), 1,624 votes; Jelka Godec (SDS, Šentjur), 2,139 votes; Anita Koleša (SMC, Šentjur), 3,088 votes; Danilo Anton Ranc (SMC, Ravne na Koroškem), 4,278 votes; Ivan Škodnik (SMC, Slovenj Gradec), 3,677 votes; and Janja Sluga (SMC, Celje 2), 4,375 votes.
- National seats - Margareta Guček Zakošek (SMC, Celje 1), 4,877 votes; Andreja Katič (SD, Velenje 1), 991 votes; Benedikt Kopmajer (DeSUS, Dravograd-Radlje), 1,680 votes; and Ljubo Žnidar (SDS, Žalec 1), 2,316 votes.

Substitutions:

- Karl Erjavec (DeSUS, Žalec 1) forfeited his seat on 18 September 2014 upon being elected to the government and was replaced by Marija Antonija Kovačič (DeSUS, Velenje 1) on 30 September 2014.
- Andreja Katič (SD, Velenje 1) forfeited her seat on 13 May 2015 upon being elected to the government and was replaced by Jan Škoberne (SD, Velenje 2) on 18 May 2015.
- Margareta Guček Zakošek (SMC, Celje 1) forfeited her seat on 9 July 2015 upon being appointed to the government and was replaced by Saša Tabaković (SMC, Velenje 1) on the same day.
- Saša Tabaković (SMC, Velenje 1) forfeited his seat on 29 February 2016 when Margareta Guček Zakošek (SMC, Celje 1) left her government position, regaining her seat.
- Margareta Guček Zakošek (SMC, Celje 1) resigned on 29 February 2016 and was replaced by Saša Tabaković (SMC, Velenje 1) on 1 March 2016.

===== 2011 =====
Results of the 2011 parliamentary election held on 4 December 2011:

Party		Votes per electoral district											Total votes	%	Seats		
Party		Celje 1	Celje 2	Mozirje	Dravo- grad- Radlje	Ravne na Koroš- kem	Šentjur	Slovenj Gradec	Velenje 1	Velenje 2	Žalec 1	Žalec 2	Total votes	%	Con.	Nat.	Tot.
Slovenian Democratic Party	SDS	5,956	3,555	2,998	4,188	4,261	3,890	3,152	2,499	3,412	3,783	3,595	41,289	29.62%	3	1	4
Zoran Janković's List – Positive Slovenia	LZJ-PS	4,119	4,429	1,572	2,433	3,375	1,555	3,378	3,414	2,475	2,549	2,759	32,058	23.00%	2	1	3
Social Democrats	SD	1,668	1,852	572	1,086	1,782	738	1,181	1,604	1,073	1,040	1,066	13,662	9.80%	1	0	1
Gregor Virant's Civic List	LGV	1,743	1,364	1,021	1,519	1,469	1,028	1,206	720	605	1,007	1,207	12,889	9.25%	1	0	1
Democratic Party of Pensioners of Slovenia	DeSUS	1,635	1,284	511	1,274	1,125	896	815	899	940	1,658	1,265	12,302	8.83%	1	0	1
Slovenian People's Party	SLS	1,250	705	1,540	940	572	766	752	1,275	2,459	593	737	11,589	8.31%	0	1	1
New Slovenia – Christian People's Party	NSi	705	356	483	426	533	380	507	306	389	319	764	5,168	3.71%	0	0	0
Slovenian National Party	SNS	371	219	126	575	343	170	410	137	191	222	206	2,970	2.13%	0	0	0
Party for Sustainable; Development of Slovenia	TRS	268	286	95	197	175	322	233	161	122	123	145	2,127	1.53%	0	0	0
Liberal Democracy of Slovenia	LDS	407	166	71	171	151	279	84	113	183	172	184	1,981	1.42%	0	0	0
Democratic Labour Party	DSD	167	121	40	116	120	56	55	48	55	66	74	918	0.66%	0	0	0
Youth Party – European Greens	SMS-Z	86	107	49	79	68	56	55	32	32	66	67	697	0.50%	0	0	0
Zares		74	73	24	98	62	33	116	28	34	45	32	619	0.44%	0	0	0
Greens of Slovenia	ZS	88	90	28	45	62	77	38	28	25	65	54	600	0.43%	0	0	0
Movement for Slovenia	GZS	57	51	8	35	21	14	14	15	12	18	33	278	0.20%	0	0	0
Party of Equal Opportunities	SEM-Si	40	55	14	20	19	12	17	14	11	11	20	233	0.17%	0	0	0
Valid votes		18,634	14,713	9,152	13,202	14,138	10,272	12,013	11,293	12,018	11,737	12,208	139,380	100.00%	8	3	11
Rejected votes		361	224	135	226	211	225	212	243	255	191	184	2,467	1.74%			
Total polled		18,995	14,937	9,287	13,428	14,349	10,497	12,225	11,536	12,273	11,928	12,392	141,847	65.62%			
Registered electors		29,342	23,464	13,816	21,472	22,108	16,972	18,239	16,965	17,727	17,711	18,361	216,177				
Turnout		64.74%	63.66%	67.22%	62.54%	64.90%	61.85%	67.03%	68.00%	69.23%	67.35%	67.49%	65.62%				

The following candidates were elected:

- Constituency seats - Karl Erjavec (DeSUS, Žalec 1), 1,658 votes; Jože Kavtičnik (LZJ-PS, Velenje 1), 3,414 votes; Polonca Komar, (LGV, Dravograd-Radlje), 1,519 votes; Srečko Meh (SD, Velenje 1), 1,604 votes; Janja Napast (SDS, Mozirje), 2,998 votes; Stanko Stepišnik (LZJ-PS, Celje 2), 4,429 votes; Štefan Tisel (SDS, Šentjur), 3,890 votes; and Ljubo Žnidar (SDS, Žalec 1), 3,783 votes.
- National seats - Jakob Presečnik (SLS, Mozirje), 1,540 votes; Sonja Ramšak (SDS, Celje 1), 5,956 votes; and Matjaž Zanoškar (LZJ-PS, Slovenj Gradec), 3,378 votes.

Substitutions:

- Karl Erjavec (DeSUS, Žalec 1) forfeited his seat on 10 February 2012 upon being elected to the government and was replaced by Marija Plevčak (DeSUS, Žalec 2) on 14 February 2012.
- Ljubo Žnidar (SDS, Žalec 1) forfeited his seat on 16 October 2012 upon being appointed to the government and was replaced by Alenka Koren Gomboc (SDS, Dravograd-Radlje) on 22 October 2012.
- Alenka Koren Gomboc (SDS, Dravograd-Radlj) forfeited her seat on 7 February 2013 when Ljubo Žnidar (SDS, Žalec 1) left his government position, regaining his seat.
- Stanko Stepišnik (LZJ-PS, Celje 2) forfeited his seat on 20 March 2013 upon being elected to the government and was replaced by Peter Oder (LZJ-PS, Ravne na Koroškem) on 27 March 2013.
- Peter Oder (LZJ-PS, Ravne na Koroškem) forfeited his seat on 11 December 2013 when Stanko Stepišnik (LZJ-PS, Celje 2) left his government position, regaining his seat.

==== 2000s ====
===== 2008 =====
Results of the 2008 parliamentary election held on 21 September 2008:

Party		Votes per electoral district											Total votes	%	Seats		
Party		Celje 1	Celje 2	Mozirje	Dravo- grad- Radlje	Ravne na Koroš- kem	Šentjur	Slovenj Gradec	Velenje 1	Velenje 2	Žalec 1	Žalec 2	Total votes	%	Con.	Nat.	Tot.
Slovenian Democratic Party	SDS	5,356	3,161	2,970	3,709	4,898	3,771	2,876	2,714	4,037	3,471	3,870	40,833	30.36%	3	1	4
Social Democrats	SD	3,869	4,535	1,463	4,261	4,148	1,554	3,406	4,123	3,214	2,373	2,894	35,840	26.65%	3	0	3
Democratic Party of Pensioners of Slovenia	DeSUS	1,581	1,230	854	1,082	858	699	2,233	861	973	1,746	1,191	13,308	9.90%	1	0	1
Zares		1,508	1,507	551	648	1,850	607	706	1,838	919	1,442	1,060	12,636	9.40%	1	0	1
Slovenian People's Party and Youth Party of Slovenia	SLS-SMS	2,129	2,259	1,668	678	232	1,248	531	169	240	295	505	9,954	7.40%	0	1	1
Slovenian National Party	SNS	1,043	618	598	1,361	922	581	1,019	517	723	698	694	8,774	6.52%	0	1	1
Liberal Democracy of Slovenia	LDS	658	531	280	649	629	293	326	317	388	490	595	5,156	3.83%	0	0	0
New Slovenia – Christian People's Party	NSi	303	141	311	144	292	347	262	189	421	235	631	3,276	2.44%	0	0	0
Lipa		299	194	140	353	262	85	243	131	119	136	157	2,119	1.58%	0	0	0
Greens of Slovenia	ZS	94	107	54	60	53	39	36	33	39	65	49	629	0.47%	0	0	0
List for Justice and Development	LPR	92	41	34	96	56	50	66	34	41	21	30	561	0.42%	0	0	0
Christian Democratic Party	SKD	84	48	23	37	82	30	25	23	32	23	64	471	0.35%	0	0	0
List for Clear Drinking Water	LZČPV	50	51	31	34	32	26	22	30	30	34	51	391	0.29%	0	0	0
Party of Slovenian People	SSN	40	39	24	25	33	20	22	40	47	32	51	373	0.28%	0	0	0
Green Coalition: Green Party and Green Progress	ZL-ZP	47	23	5	0	41	21	0	0	0	12	12	161	0.12%	0	0	0
Valid votes		17,153	14,485	9,006	13,137	14,388	9,371	11,773	11,019	11,223	11,073	11,854	134,482	100.00%	8	3	11
Rejected votes		374	240	148	294	179	234	224	146	205	228	209	2,481	1.81%			
Total polled		17,527	14,725	9,154	13,431	14,567	9,605	11,997	11,165	11,428	11,301	12,063	136,963	63.42%			
Registered electors		29,030	23,981	13,767	21,531	22,336	16,792	18,103	17,320	17,741	17,453	17,907	215,961				
Turnout		60.38%	61.40%	66.49%	62.38%	65.22%	57.20%	66.27%	64.46%	64.42%	64.75%	67.36%	63.42%				

The following candidates were elected:

- Constituency seats - Alan Bukovnik (SD, Dravograd-Radlje), 4,261 votes; Bojan Kontič (SD, Velenje 1), 4,123 votes; Matej Lahovnik (Zares, Velenje 1), 1,838 votes; Darko Menih (SDS, Velenje 2), 4,037 votes; Miro Petek (SDS, Ravne na Koroškem), 4,898 votes; Andreja Rihter (SD, Celje 2), 4,535 votes; Štefan Tisel (SDS, Šentjur), 3,771 votes; and Matjaž Zanoškar (DeSUS, Slovenj Gradec), 2,233 votes.
- National seats - Zmago Jelinčič Plemeniti (SNS, Slovenj Gradec), 1,019 votes; Iztok Podkrižnik (SDS, Mozirje), 2,970 votes; and Jakob Presečnik (SLS-SMS, Mozirje), 1,668 votes.

Substitutions:

- Matej Lahovnik (Zares, Velenje 1) forfeited his seat on 21 November 2008 upon being elected to the government and was replaced by Lojze Posedel (Zares, Žalec 1) on 16 December 2008.
- Lojze Posedel (Zares, Žalec 1) forfeited his seat on 16 July 2010 when Matej Lahovnik (Zares, Velenje 1) left his government position, regaining his seat.
- Matej Lahovnik (Zares, Velenje 1) resigned on 7 September 2010 and was replaced by Lojze Posedel (Zares, Žalec 1) on 20 September 2010.

===== 2004 =====
Results of the 2004 parliamentary election held on 3 October 2004:

Party		Votes per electoral district											Total votes	%	Seats		
Party		Celje 1	Celje 2	Mozirje	Dravo- grad- Radlje	Ravne na Koroš- kem	Šentjur	Slovenj Gradec	Velenje 1	Velenje 2	Žalec 1	Žalec 2	Total votes	%	Con.	Nat.	Tot.
Slovenian Democratic Party	SDS	4,920	3,522	3,163	3,878	6,138	2,473	2,854	2,606	3,020	3,241	3,662	39,477	31.56%	3	1	4
Liberal Democracy of Slovenia	LDS	3,519	3,493	1,287	1,669	3,295	1,283	2,040	2,416	2,304	2,665	2,377	26,348	21.06%	2	0	2
United List of Social Democrats	ZLSD	1,128	1,858	333	2,200	1,266	492	834	1,938	1,204	629	621	12,503	10.00%	1	0	1
Slovenian National Party	SNS	1,136	768	453	1,857	1,068	508	1,826	653	755	888	914	10,826	8.65%	1	0	1
New Slovenia – Christian People's Party	NSi	1,208	691	663	551	783	881	877	652	1,152	645	967	9,070	7.25%	0	1	1
Slovenian People's Party	SLS	930	561	1,584	497	582	1,079	974	282	438	419	563	7,909	6.32%	0	1	1
Democratic Party of Pensioners of Slovenia	DeSUS	835	648	445	686	351	373	365	559	544	688	622	6,116	4.89%	0	1	1
Youth Party of Slovenia	SMS	372	229	145	209	210	886	375	239	245	230	184	3,324	2.66%	0	0	0
Active Slovenia	AS	387	314	258	180	184	207	159	272	196	281	420	2,858	2.28%	0	0	0
Slovenia is Ours	SN	363	561	96	40	59	106	122	75	91	87	220	1,820	1.45%	0	0	0
June List	JL	150	189	51	104	91	69	132	101	108	82	89	1,166	0.93%	0	0	0
Greens of Slovenia	ZS	120	124	42	50	49	30	44	46	60	42	68	675	0.54%	0	0	0
Women's Voice of Slovenia, Association for Primorska, Union of Independents of Slovenia and New Democracy of Slovenia	GZS- ZZP- ZNS- NDS	52	56	9	96	62	16	120	37	65	49	40	602	0.48%	0	0	0
List for Enterprising Slovenia	PS	80	66	35	55	13	70	9	35	39	77	61	540	0.43%	0	0	0
Democratic Party of Slovenia	DS	52	34	34	77	73	22	29	35	45	39	27	467	0.37%	0	0	0
Party of Ecological; Movements of Slovenia	SEG	60	69	28	33	48	27	25	27	32	54	42	445	0.36%	0	0	0
Party of Slovenian People	SSN	42	22	19	26	34	22	43	54	90	36	26	414	0.33%	0	0	0
Forward Slovenia	NPS	56	57	25	26	23	18	13	20	44	20	28	330	0.26%	0	0	0
United for an Independent and Just Slovenia		43	35	12	11	16	15	6	8	23	14	14	197	0.16%	0	0	0
Valid votes		15,453	13,297	8,682	12,245	14,345	8,577	10,847	10,055	10,455	10,186	10,945	125,087	100.00%	7	4	11
Rejected votes		388	357	162	278	233	258	260	198	253	226	235	2,848	2.23%			
Total polled		15,841	13,654	8,844	12,523	14,578	8,835	11,107	10,253	10,708	10,412	11,180	127,935	60.87%			
Registered electors		27,899	24,097	13,375	20,918	21,814	16,208	17,414	17,202	17,307	16,644	17,312	210,190				
Turnout		56.78%	56.66%	66.12%	59.87%	66.83%	54.51%	63.78%	59.60%	61.87%	62.56%	64.58%	60.87%				

The following candidates were elected:

- Constituency seats - Slavko Gaber (LDS, Celje 1), 3,519 votes; Zmago Jelinčič Plemeniti (SNS, Slovenj Gradec), 1,826 votes; Bojan Kontič (ZLSD, Velenje 1), 1,938 votes; Miro Petek (SDS, Ravne na Koroškem), 6,138 votes; Lojze Posedel (LDS, Žalec 1), 2,665 votes; Franc Sušnik (SDS, Žalec 2), 3,662 votes; and Mirko Zamernik (SDS, Mozirje), 3,163 votes.
- National seats - Franc Jazbec (SDS, Celje 1), 4,920 votes; Ivan Jelen (DeSUS, Žalec 1), 688 votes; Drago Koren (NSi, Velenje 2); 1,152 votes; and Jakob Presečnik (SLS, Mozirje), 1,584 votes.

===== 2000 =====
Results of the 2000 parliamentary election held on 15 October 2000:

Party		Votes per electoral district											Total votes	%	Seats		
Party		Celje 1	Celje 2	Mozirje	Dravo- grad- Radlje	Ravne	Šentjur	Slovenj Gradec	Velenje 1	Velenje 2	Žalec 1	Žalec 2	Total votes	%	Con.	Nat.	Tot.
Liberal Democracy of Slovenia	LDS	6,534	6,965	2,548	3,798	6,012	2,820	4,177	5,040	4,647	3,813	3,675	50,029	36.53%	4	0	4
Social Democratic Party of Slovenia	SDSS	3,139	2,222	2,572	1,707	1,940	1,275	1,491	1,282	1,756	1,633	2,337	21,354	15.59%	1	1	2
United List of Social Democrats	ZLSD	1,223	1,972	527	2,108	1,643	559	1,460	2,109	1,237	883	1,056	14,777	10.79%	1	0	1
Slovenian People's Party and Slovene Christian Democrats	SLS-SKD	2,694	771	1,929	1,208	1,154	2,280	651	563	807	1,152	1,185	14,394	10.51%	1	0	1
Democratic Party of Pensioners of Slovenia	DeSUS	1,109	1,144	448	1,247	755	465	857	664	785	1,216	1,156	9,846	7.19%	0	1	1
New Slovenia – Christian People's Party	NSi	984	920	712	770	1,401	541	1,093	585	926	689	817	9,438	6.89%	0	0	0
Slovenian National Party	SNS	693	938	231	830	923	634	812	436	412	468	568	6,945	5.07%	0	1	1
Youth Party of Slovenia	SMS	844	869	454	465	514	713	420	635	545	616	496	6,571	4.80%	0	1	1
Greens of Slovenia	ZS	129	155	42	82	87	76	43	112	111	87	99	1,023	0.75%	0	0	0
Democratic Party of Slovenia	DS	67	68	26	226	165	29	81	55	27	39	29	812	0.59%	0	0	0
New Party	NS	90	51	46	60	63	35	66	57	48	37	19	572	0.42%	0	0	0
Planinšič Franc (Independent)	Ind	37	32	13	275	26	23	35	16	15	19	27	518	0.38%	0	0	0
Forward Slovenia	NPS	64	57	18	22	17	20	17	23	22	36	28	324	0.24%	0	0	0
Peter Črtomir Gorjanc (Independent)	Ind	25	17	7	30	125	11	26	11	8	11	5	276	0.20%	0	0	0
Hinko Stakne (Independent)	Ind	0	0	0	0	0	0	0	0	75	0	0	75	0.05%	0	0	0
Valid votes		17,632	16,181	9,573	12,828	14,825	9,481	11,229	11,588	11,421	10,699	11,497	136,954	100.00%	7	4	11
Rejected votes		723	612	291	421	388	395	414	271	356	346	407	4,624	3.27%			
Total polled		18,355	16,793	9,864	13,249	15,213	9,876	11,643	11,859	11,777	11,045	11,904	141,578	69.19%			
Registered electors		26,962	24,407	13,084	20,423	21,261	15,705	16,798	16,650	16,702	15,975	16,643	204,610				
Turnout		68.08%	68.80%	75.39%	64.87%	71.55%	62.88%	69.31%	71.23%	70.51%	69.14%	71.53%	69.19%				

The following candidates were elected:

- Constituency seats - Slavko Gaber (LDS); Jože Kavtičnik (LDS); Bojan Kontič (ZLSD); Milan Kopušar (LDS); Jurij Malovrh (SLS-SKD); Irma Pavlinič Krebs (LDS); and Mirko Zamernik (SDSS).
- National seats - Sonja Areh Lavrič (SNS); Anton Delak (DeSUS); Marko Diaci (SMS); and Franc Sušnik (SDSS).

Substitutions:

- Anton Delak (DeSUS) died on 6 March 2002 and was replaced by Franc Lenko (DeSUS) on 19 March 2002.
- Slavko Gaber (LDS) forfeited his seat on 19 December 2002 upon being elected to the government and was replaced by Janez Komljanec (LDS) on 27 December 2002.

==== 1990s ====
===== 1996 =====
Results of the 1996 parliamentary election held on 10 November 1996:

Party		Votes per electoral district											Total votes	%	Seats		
Party		Celje 1	Celje 2	Mozirje	Dravo- grad- Radlje	Ravne	Šentjur	Slovenj Gradec	Velenje 1	Velenje 2	Žalec 1	Žalec 2	Total votes	%	Con.	Nat.	Tot.
Liberal Democracy of Slovenia	LDS	4,299	5,484	1,985	4,184	4,079	2,062	3,418	3,994	3,162	2,976	3,141	38,784	28.17%	3	0	3
Slovenian People's Party	SLS	2,907	2,073	3,187	3,062	2,889	2,079	2,034	1,561	2,172	1,763	2,335	26,062	18.93%	2	0	2
Social Democratic Party of Slovenia	SDSS	3,765	3,179	2,288	1,931	2,488	1,829	1,702	1,581	2,328	1,841	1,847	24,779	18.00%	1	1	2
Slovene Christian Democrats	SKD	1,511	883	752	980	1,766	1,482	1,248	834	1,010	1,112	1,261	12,839	9.32%	1	0	1
Democratic Party of Pensioners of Slovenia	DeSUS	1,367	1,050	441	1,085	861	400	814	494	658	990	1,014	9,174	6.66%	0	1	1
United List of Social Democrats	ZLSD	700	1,327	342	471	1,463	483	886	1,335	941	443	572	8,963	6.51%	0	1	1
Slovenian National Party	SNS	517	543	132	411	548	182	512	192	154	281	217	3,689	2.68%	0	0	0
Republican Association of Slovenia	RZS	167	140	49	72	142	44	88	941	899	142	102	2,786	2.02%	0	0	0
Greens of Slovenia	ZS	359	346	118	254	243	205	146	313	210	206	238	2,638	1.92%	0	0	0
Democratic Party of Slovenia	DS	346	374	146	161	326	151	147	200	111	206	126	2,294	1.67%	0	0	0
Slovenian Craftsmen and Entrepreneurial; Party and Centrum Party	SOPS	182	172	119	152	120	111	98	113	115	82	123	1,387	1.01%	0	0	0
Slovenian Forum	SF	122	144	0	55	38	83	33	53	41	189	76	834	0.61%	0	0	0
Christian Social Union	KSU	127	90	24	86	61	47	33	74	66	46	49	703	0.51%	0	0	0
Liberal Party	LS	135	145	67	75	35	40	29	61	49	31	36	703	0.51%	0	0	0
Slovenian National Right	SND	79	62	38	50	80	30	57	66	61	40	46	609	0.44%	0	0	0
Green Alternative of Slovenia	ZA	99	115	13	50	54	26	39	40	56	34	29	555	0.40%	0	0	0
National Labour Party	NSD	99	97	18	43	56	29	36	43	36	38	38	533	0.39%	0	0	0
Party for the Equality of Regions	SED	53	104	8	24	42	20	27	33	20	18	18	367	0.27%	0	0	0
Valid votes		16,834	16,328	9,727	13,146	15,291	9,303	11,347	11,928	12,089	10,438	11,268	137,699	100.00%	7	3	10
Rejected votes													8,220	5.63%			
Total polled													145,919	73.67%			
Registered electors													198,067				
Turnout													73.67%				

The following candidates were elected:

- Constituency seats - Alojz Kovše (LDS); Jurij Malovrh (SKD); Darinka Mravljak (SLS); Jakob Presečnik (SLS); Herman Tomažič (LDS); Mirko Zamernik (SDSS); and Jožef Zimšek (LDS).
- National seats - Anton Delak (DeSUS); Franc Jazbec (SDSS); and Bojan Kontič (ZLSD).

Substitutions:

- Alojz Kovše (LDS) forfeited his seat on 3 April 1997 upon being appointed to the government and was replaced by Peter Petrovič (LDS) on 22 April 1997.

===== 1992 =====
Results of the 1992 parliamentary election held on 6 December 1992:

Party		Votes	%	Seats		
Party		Votes	%	Con.	Nat.	Tot.
Liberal Democracy of Slovenia	LDS	45,691	30.10%	3	0	3
Slovene Christian Democrats	SKD	19,359	12.75%	1	0	1
United List	ZL	18,539	12.21%	1	0	1
Slovenian National Party	SNS	12,960	8.54%	0	1	1
Slovenian People's Party	SLS	12,396	8.17%	0	1	1
Greens of Slovenia	ZS	5,865	3.86%	0	1	1
Democratic Party of Slovenia	DS	5,239	3.45%	0	0	0
National Democratic Party and Slovenian Party	ND-SGS	4,434	2.92%	0	0	0
Social Democratic Party of Slovenia	SDSS	4,089	2.69%	0	0	0
Slovenian Craftsmen and Entrepreneurial; Party and Centrum Party	SOPS	2,794	1.84%	0	0	0
Socialist Party of Slovenia	SSS	2,444	1.61%	0	0	0
Independent Party	SN	2,444	1.61%	0	0	0
Christian Socialists, DS Forward and Free Party	KS-DS	2,406	1.59%	0	0	0
Independent	Ind	2,114	1.39%	0	0	0
Liberal Democratic Party of Slovenia	LDSS	1,983	1.31%	0	0	0
Republican Association of Slovenia	RZS	1,862	1.23%	0	0	0
Liberal Party	LS	1,735	1.14%	0	0	0
Styrian Democratic Christian Party	SDKS	1,342	0.88%	0	0	0
DEMOS	DEMOS	1,248	0.82%	0	0	0
Slovenian Ecological Movement	SEG	922	0.61%	0	0	0
Movement for General Democracy	GOD	895	0.59%	0	0	0
“SMER" Association of Slovenia	SMER	867	0.57%	0	0	0
Primorska Association	ZZP	168	0.11%	0	0	0
Valid votes		151,796	100.00%	5	3	8
Rejected votes		10,290	6.35%			
Total polled		162,086	84.63%			
Registered electors		191,514				
Turnout		84.63%				

The following candidates were elected:

- Constituency seats - Franc Avberšek (ZL); Jurij Malovrh (SKD); Herman Rigelnik (LDS); Maks Sušek (LDS); and Janez Zupanec (LDS).
- National seats - Vladimir Topler (ZS); Ivan Verzolak (SNS); and Franc Zagožen (SLS).
- Herman Rigelnik (LDS) resigned on 5 September 1994 and was replaced by Peter Petrovič (LDS) on 28 September 1994.
