= Šenbric =

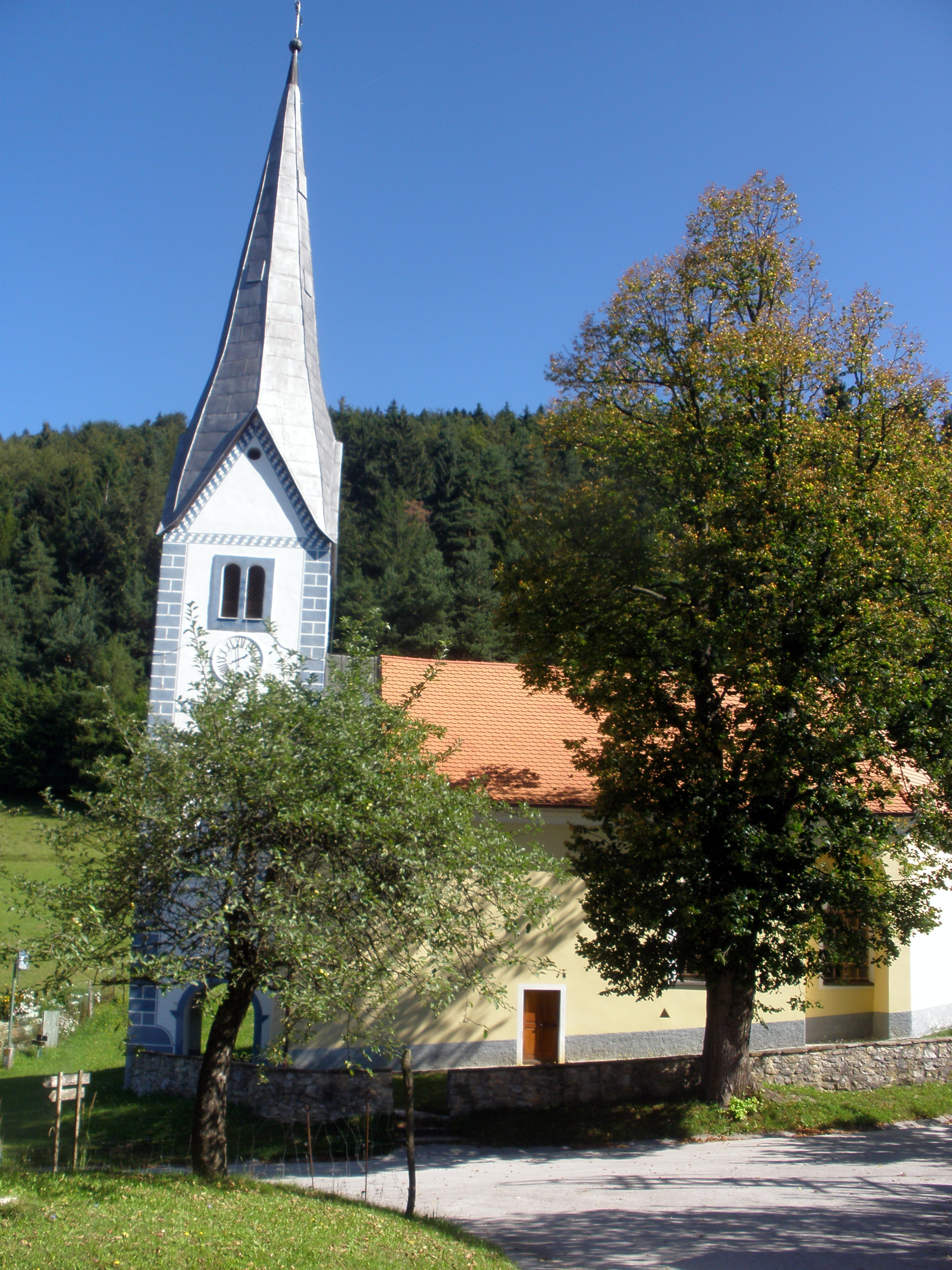
- Saint Brice's Church

- Location in Slovenia
- Coordinates: 46°22′55.99″N 15°7′57.88″E
- Country: Slovenia
- Traditional region: Styria
- Statistical region: Savinja
- Municipality: Velenje

Area
  - Total: 2.12 km^{2} (0.82 sq mi)
- Elevation: 558.6 m (1,833 ft)

Population (2003)
  - Total: 167

Šenbric (pronounced [ʃɛmˈbɾiːts] or [ʃəmˈbɾiːts]) is a settlement in the Municipality of Velenje in northern Slovenia. The area is part of the traditional region of Styria. The entire municipality is now included in the Savinja Statistical Region.

== History ==
Šenbric was created as a separate settlement in 1982 by combining parts of the settlements of Hrastovec and Šmartinske Cirkovce.

== Church ==
The local church from which the settlement gets its name is dedicated to Saint Brice (Slovene: sveti Brikcij or Bric) and belongs to the Parish of Velenje–Saint Martin. It is a Late Gothic building that was extensively rebuilt in the 18th century.
