= Lopatnik pri Velenju =

Lopatnik pri Velenju Lopatnik pri Titovem Velenju (1982–1990)
- Location in Slovenia
- Coordinates: 46°22′6.58″N 15°10′4.56″E
- Country: Slovenia
- Traditional region: Styria
- Statistical region: Savinja
- Municipality: Velenje

Area
  - Total: 1.33 km^{2} (0.51 sq mi)
- Elevation: 574.9 m (1,886 ft)

Population (2002)
  - Total: 67

Lopatnik pri Velenju (pronounced [lɔˈpaːtnik pɾi ʋɛˈlɛːnju]) is a settlement in the Municipality of Velenje in northern Slovenia. The area is part of the traditional region of Styria. Since 2007 the entire municipality has been included in the Savinja Statistical Region.

== Name ==
The settlement was created by separating it from Paški Kozjak and naming it Lopatnik pri Titovem Velenju in 1982. The name of the settlement was changed from Lopatnik pri Titovem Velenju to Lopatnik pri Velenju in 1990, corresponding to the change of Titovo Velenje to Velenje the same year.
