= Nejc Pačnik =

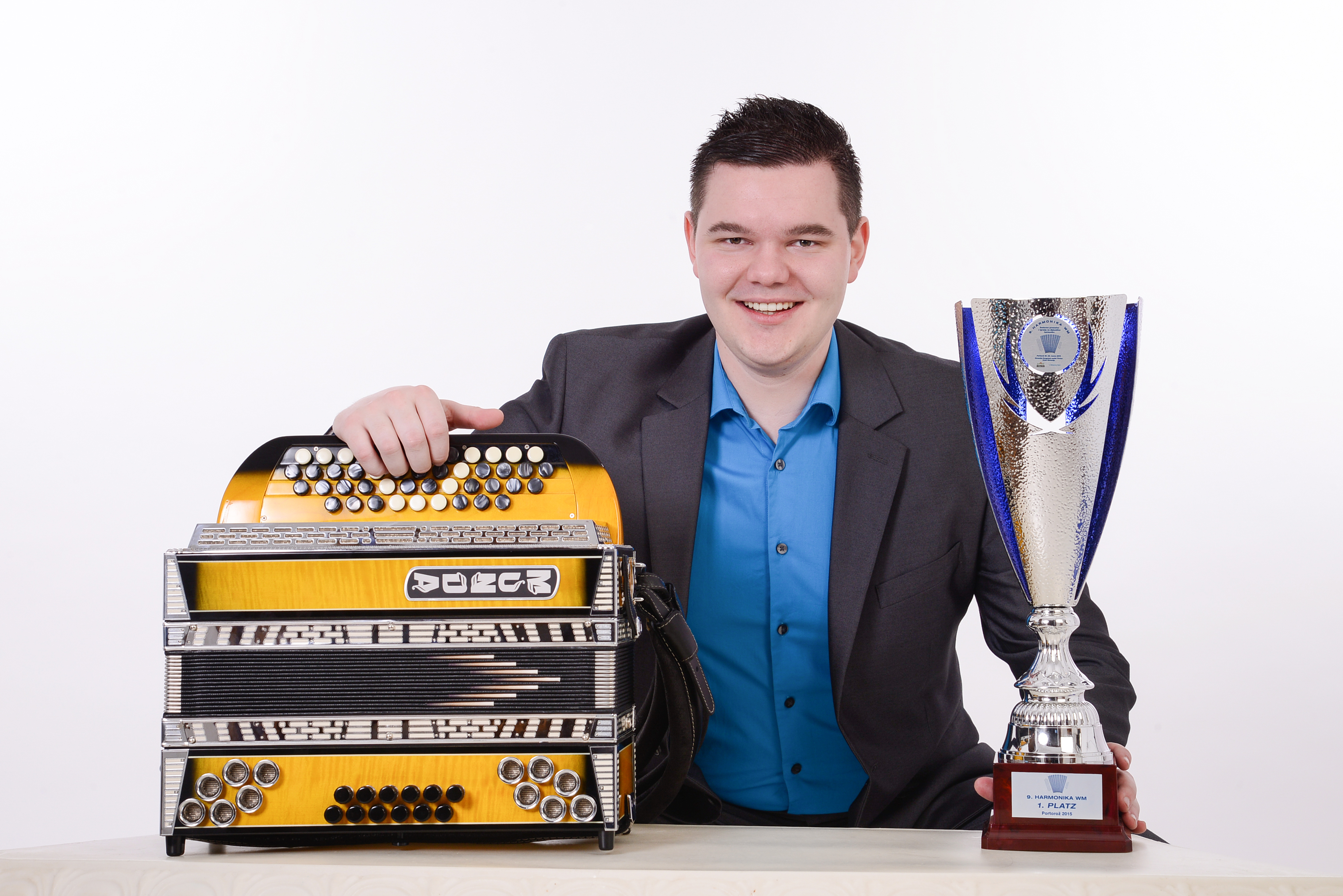

Background information
- Born: 28 October 1990 (age 35); Slovenj Gradec, Slovenia
- Origin: Škale, Velenje, Slovenia
- Genres: Folk Music
- Occupation: Musician accordionist
- Years active: 1995 – present
- Website: nejcpacnik.com

Nejc Pačnik (born 28 October 1990) is a Slovenian diatonic button accordion, an accordion world champion and accordion teacher.

== Early life ==
Pačnik was born on 28 October 1990 in Slovenj Gradec, Slovenia. He attended a primary school located in his hometown Škale and in Velenje. He continued his education at the Wood Secondary School in Slovenj Gradec, Slovenia. His interest in playing a diatonic accordion was raised early since his 4th year when his grandfather Franc showed him the first steps into this instrument and inspired him enormously.

== Career ==
At the age of five, he started taking lessons from Tine Lesjak in Slovenia. After two years, he changed teachers and started learning from Robert Golicnik. At eight, he participated at a remarkable Slovenian Competition "Delcnjak's Memorial" for the first time and won the competition.

At the age of twelve, he participated at a charity concert where he heard the world champion accordionist Robert Gotar for the first time. The same year, under the mentorship of Robert Gotar, he performed at the Slovenian competition "Golden Accordion Award of Ljubečna" where he got into half finals.

He became a European Absolute Champion in Attimis in Italy in 2007. His beginner's competition career proceeded in 2008 when he became an absolute winner of Golden Accordion Award of Ljubecna.

Afterwards, he participated in a world championship and won the 4th place in 2005. Following two years, he won the title of a world vice-champion. In his most successful period of his competition career (in year 2009), he became Junior World-champion in playing a diatonic accordion in Austria. By 2010, he won more than 70th competitions at home and abroad. In 2015, he became an accordion world-champion.

== Achievements ==
- Absolute World Champion 2015
- Junior World Champion 2009
- World Vice-Champion 2007
- 4th place at a World Championship 2005
- European Absolute Champion 2007
- European Champion until age of 18 in 2007
- European Champion until age of 15 in 2005
- 2nd place at European Championship in 2006
- 3rd place at European Championship in 2004
- Absolute Winner of Golden Accordion Award of Ljubečna in 2008 and 2009
- Audience Winner of Golden Accordion Award of Ljubečna in 2009
- Golden Citation of Golden Accordion Award of Ljubečna in 2007, 2008, 2009 and 2010
- Silver Citation of Golden Accordion Award of Ljubečna in 2003 and 2006
- Bronze Citation of Golden Accordion Award of Ljubečna in 2004
- 1st place at an international competition of Josef Peyer Wettbewerb (Austria)
- 1st place until 18 year at a competition »Ruška cottage« in 2006 and 2007
- Absolute Winner of a »Ruška Cottage« in 2007
- 1st place and an Absolute Winner of a »Dolič Cup«
- 3 times consecutively an Absolute Winner of »Delčnjak's Memorial«
- 3 times consecutively an Absolute Winner of »Old Velenje Cup«
- 3 times an Absolute Winner of »Mislinja Valley Cup«
