= Jelka Godec =

Slovenian politician (born 1969)

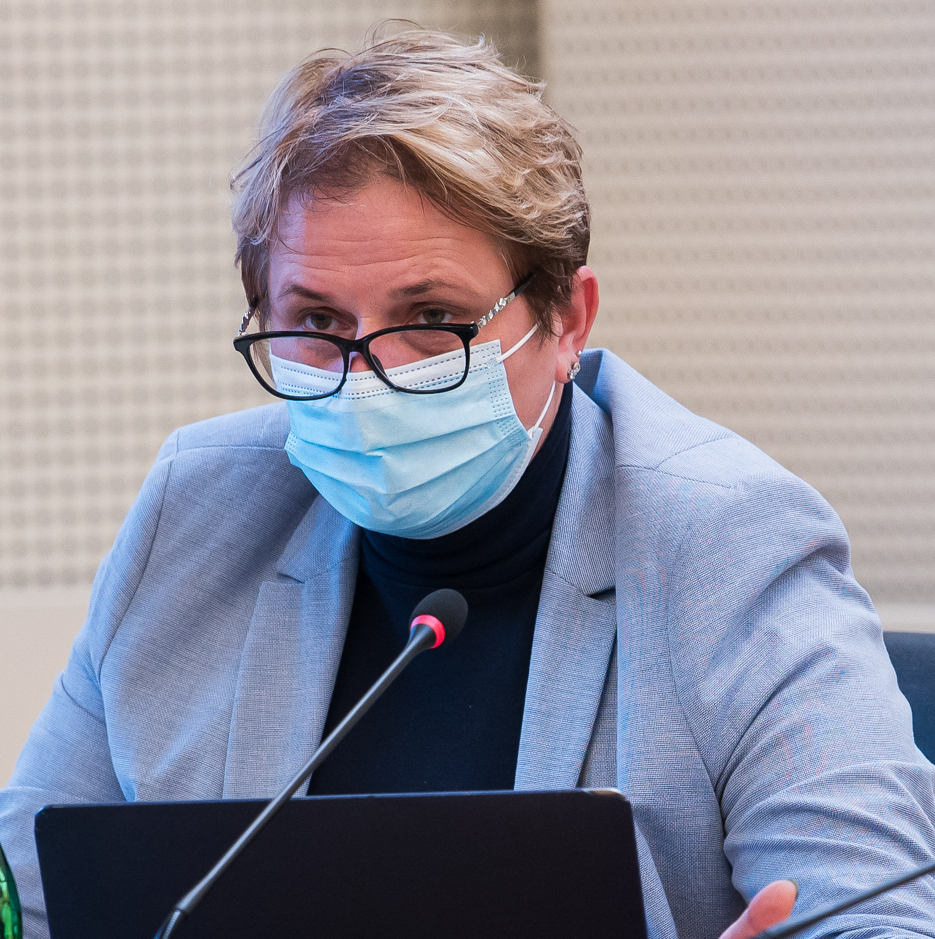
- Godec in 2022

Member of the National Assembly
- Incumbent
- Assumed office 13 May 2022
- Constituency: Celje – Šentjur
- In office 1 August 2014 – 26 March 2020
- Succeeded by: Ljubo Žnidar
- Constituency: Celje – Šentjur

Personal details
- Born: 21 November 1969 (age 56)
- Party: Slovenian Democratic Party

Jelka Godec (born 21 November 1969) is a Slovenian politician. She has been a member of the National Assembly since 2022, having previously served from 2014 to 2020. From 2020 to 2022, she served as state secretary of the Office of the Prime Minister.
