= Laze, Velenje =

Laze
- Location in Slovenia
- Coordinates: 46°20′36.07″N 15°7′52.86″E
- Country: Slovenia
- Traditional region: Styria
- Statistical region: Savinja
- Municipality: Velenje

Area
  - Total: 3.23 km^{2} (1.25 sq mi)
- Elevation: 381.5 m (1,252 ft)

Population (2002)
  - Total: 422

Laze (pronounced [ˈlaːzɛ]) is a settlement in the Municipality of Velenje in northern Slovenia. The area is part of the traditional region of Styria. The entire municipality is now included in the Savinja Statistical Region.

The ruins of Švarcenštajn Castle (Slovene: Grad Švarcenštajn, German: Schwarzenstein) stand south of the settlement. It was first mentioned in written documents dating to 1360 as Swarczenstain. It was a four-sided 14th-century building around an inner courtyard, of which only one side with a turret over the entrance remains today.
