= Bevče =

Bevče Bevška Vas (until 1952)
- Location in Slovenia
- Coordinates: 46°21′25.24″N 15°8′42.09″E
- Country: Slovenia
- Traditional region: Styria
- Statistical region: Savinja
- Municipality: Velenje

Area
  - Total: 2.16 km^{2} (0.83 sq mi)
- Elevation: 413.1 m (1,355 ft)

Population (2002)
  - Total: 216

Bevče (pronounced [ˈbeːu̯tʃɛ]) is a settlement in the Municipality of Velenje in northern Slovenia. The area is part of the traditional region of Styria. The entire municipality is now included in the Savinja Statistical Region.

== Name ==
The name of the settlement was changed from Bevška vas to Bevče in 1952.

== Church ==
The local church is dedicated to Saint Nicholas (Slovene: sveti Miklavž). It dates to the 16th century with 18th-century rebuilding.
