= Škalske Cirkovce =

- Location in Slovenia
- Coordinates: 46°23′43.26″N 15°8′8.29″E
- Country: Slovenia
- Traditional region: Styria
- Statistical region: Savinja
- Municipality: Velenje

Area
  - Total: 3.1 km^{2} (1.2 sq mi)
- Elevation: 615.3 m (2,019 ft)

Population (2002)
  - Total: 155

Škalske Cirkovce (pronounced [ˈʃkaːlskɛ ˈtsiːɾkɔu̯tsɛ]) is a settlement in the Municipality of Velenje in northern Slovenia. It lies in the hills north of Velenje. The area is part of the traditional region of Styria. The entire municipality is now included in the Savinja Statistical Region.

The local church is dedicated to Saint Oswald (Slovene: sveti Ožbolt) and belongs to the Parish of Velenje Saint Martin. Parts of the original Romanesque building are preserved in the northern wall of the nave. The sanctuary is Gothic and the remainder of the church dates to a major rebuilding in the late 18th century.
