= Jožef Krajnc =

Slovene jurist, philosopher and politician (1821–1875)

Jožef Krajnc, also written Josef Krainc or Josef Krainz (17 February 1821 – 22 February 1875) was a Slovenian jurist, philosopher, legal scholar and politician.

== Life ==
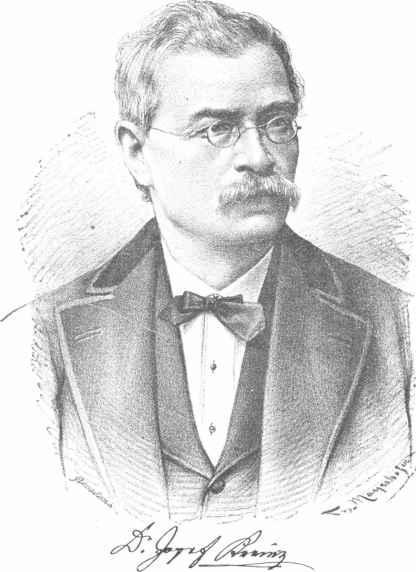
Portrait of Krajnc

Krajnc was born in Škale (north of Velenje) in the Duchy of Styria to a farmer of the same name. He attended the gymnasium in Celje between 1832 and 1841, obtaining his matura. Beginning in 1841 and lasting up to 1845, he studied philosophy and law in Graz, obtaining doctorates in both disciplines. From 1842 onward, he financed his studies as a private tutor to a wealthy landowner's family in Graz and Bad Radkersburg. In 1845, Krajnc began working as legal advisor first to the city council of Radkersburg, then to the council of Graz. For a short time in 1847, he worked as a judge in Graz.

During the March Revolution, Krajnc served as a member of the Austrian Reichstag from 1848 to 1849, taking the seat for Vinzenz Gurnigg who declined his mandate. Among other duties, Krajnc served on the Reichstag's constitutional committee.

From 1850 on Krajnc taught civil law at the University of Graz, first as an extraordinary professor, from 1852 on as ordinary professor. His courses were given in Slovene. After his chair was dissolved in 1854, he worked for a short time as a consultant to the Austrian Ministry of Finance in Laibach before receiving a teaching position for civil, business, and exchange law at the Handelsakademie in Hermannstadt in 1855. Krajnc held this post until 1870, when he became a professor of Austrian civil law and German common law at the University of Innsbruck.

In 1871, Krajnc was appointed a professor of civil law in Prague. This appointment soon turned into a political issue. The climate at the University of Prague was by serious tensions between German-Austrians and Czechs, both among faculty and among students. Although Krajnc was not Czech, German-Austrian opponents viewed him as a protégé of Austria's Minister of Education Josef Jireček, who was of Czech ancestry, and regarded the sudden and forced early retirement of Krajnc's German predecessor as an affront. A group of students, including Fritz Mauthner among their ringleaders, caused his inaugural lecture to end in riots. German-Austrian law students submitted a note of protest against Krajnc’s appointment to the Austrian Ministry of Education, but to no avail.

Krajnc died in Prague in 1875.

== Family ==
Jožef Krajnc married Maria Petritsch in 1858. The marriage produced two sons and one daughter.
