= Silova =

- Location in Slovenia
- Coordinates: 46°19′47.18″N 15°7′35.44″E
- Country: Slovenia
- Traditional region: Styria
- Statistical region: Savinja
- Municipality: Velenje

Area
  - Total: 3.08 km^{2} (1.19 sq mi)
- Elevation: 350.6 m (1,150 ft)

Population (2002)
  - Total: 172

Silova (pronounced [ˈsiːlɔʋa]) is a settlement in the Municipality of Velenje in northern Slovenia. It lies in the Ložnica Hills (Slovene: Ložničko gričevje) south of Velenje. The area is part of the traditional region of Styria. The entire municipality is now included in the Savinja Statistical Region.

== Notable people ==
Notable people that were born or lived in Silova include:

- Janez Janša (born 1958), politician
