= Arnače =

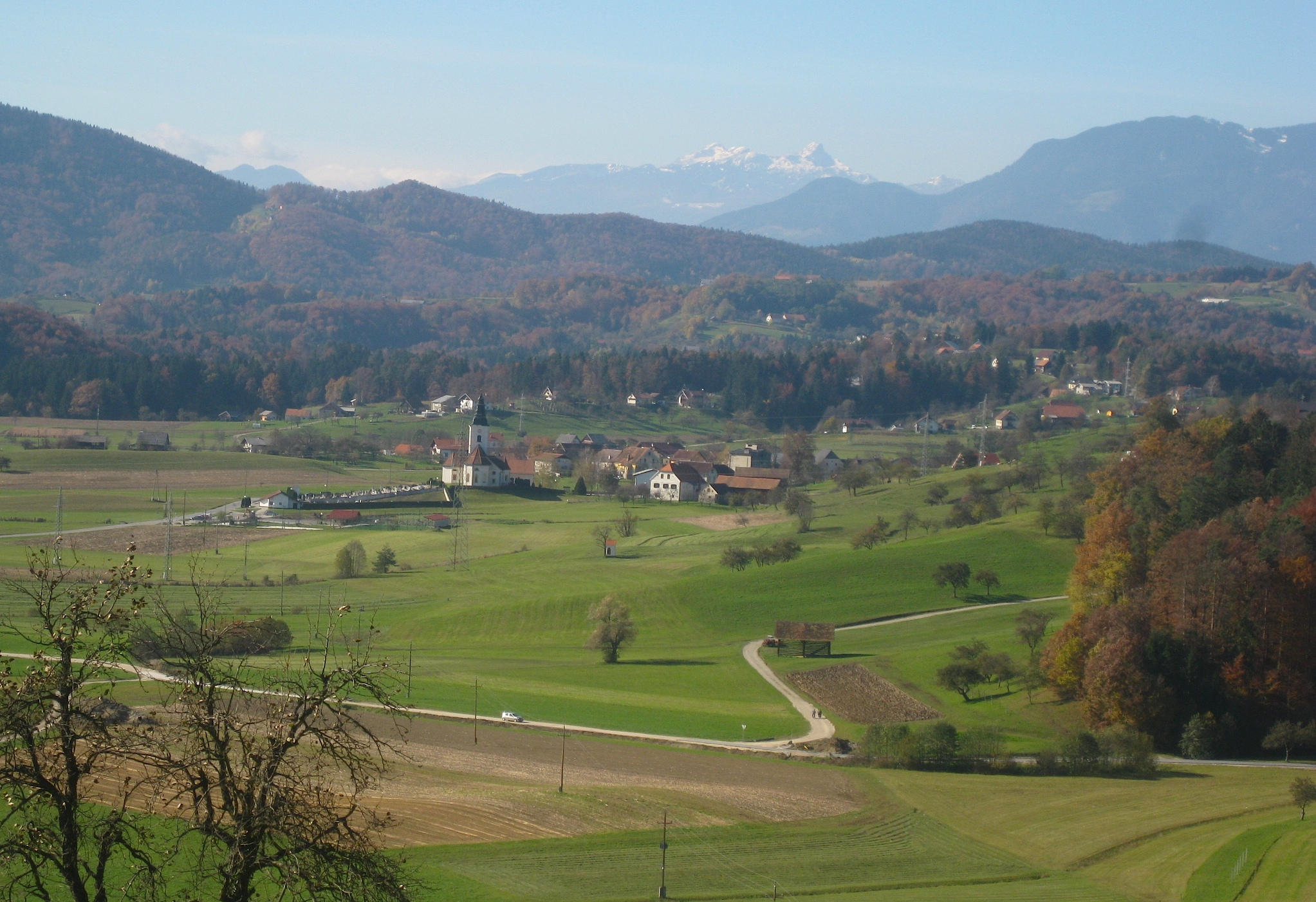

- Location in Slovenia
- Coordinates: 46°20′21.22″N 15°7′4.65″E
- Country: Slovenia
- Traditional region: Styria
- Statistical region: Savinja
- Municipality: Velenje

Area
  - Total: 1.72 km^{2} (0.66 sq mi)
- Elevation: 390.9 m (1,282 ft)

Population (2002)
  - Total: 54

Arnače (pronounced [ˈaːɾnatʃɛ]) is a village in the Municipality of Velenje in northern Slovenia. It lies in the Ložnica Hills (Slovene: Ložničko gričevje) south of the town of Velenje. The area is part of the traditional region of Styria. The entire municipality is now included in the Savinja Statistical Region.

== Church ==
The parish church in the settlement is dedicated to Saint Giles (Slovene: sveti Egidij) and belongs to the Roman Catholic Archdiocese of Maribor. It was first mentioned in written documents dating to 1365. Parts of the church were rebuilt in the mid 17th century and the early 18th century.

== Notable people ==
Notable people that were born or lived in Arnače include the following:

- Karel Oštir (1888–1973), linguist
