= Paški Kozjak =

- Location in Slovenia
- Coordinates: 46°22′3.9″N 15°11′3.5″E
- Country: Slovenia
- Traditional region: Styria
- Statistical region: Savinja
- Municipality: Velenje

Area
  - Total: 4.36 km^{2} (1.68 sq mi)
- Elevation: 638.7 m (2,095 ft)

Population (2002)
  - Total: 225

Paški Kozjak (pronounced [ˈpaːʃki ˈkoːzjak]; in older sources also Kozjak, German: Kosjak) is a settlement in the Municipality of Velenje in northern Slovenia. It lies in the hills east of the town of Velenje. The area is part of the traditional region of Styria. The entire municipality is now included in the Savinja Statistical Region.

== Name ==
Paški Kozjak was attested in written sources in 1296 as Pochsruk (and as Gosyak and Kosyak in 1403). The full name literally means 'Kozjak near Paka', differentiating the settlement from neighboring Kozjak. The name Kozjak is derived from the Slovene common noun koza 'goat', but the motivation is unclear; this may refer to goats that grazed in the area, or to the fancied resemblance of the angular mountain ridges to a goat's back. The medieval German attestation Pochsruk (literally, 'goat's back') suggests the latter origin, also referring to Paški Kozjak Ridge (elevation: 1,272 meters or 4,173 feet) northeast of the settlement. In the past, the settlement was known as Kosjak in German.

== History ==
The area was the site of a battle in the Second World War between Slovene Partisans and the Nazi German armed forces, which took place on the night of January 17, 1944, when the Partisans tried to break through the German lines to reach the Pohorje Hills. The event and the Partisans killed during the operation are commemorated with a granite monument.
