= Ložnica, Velenje =

Ložnica
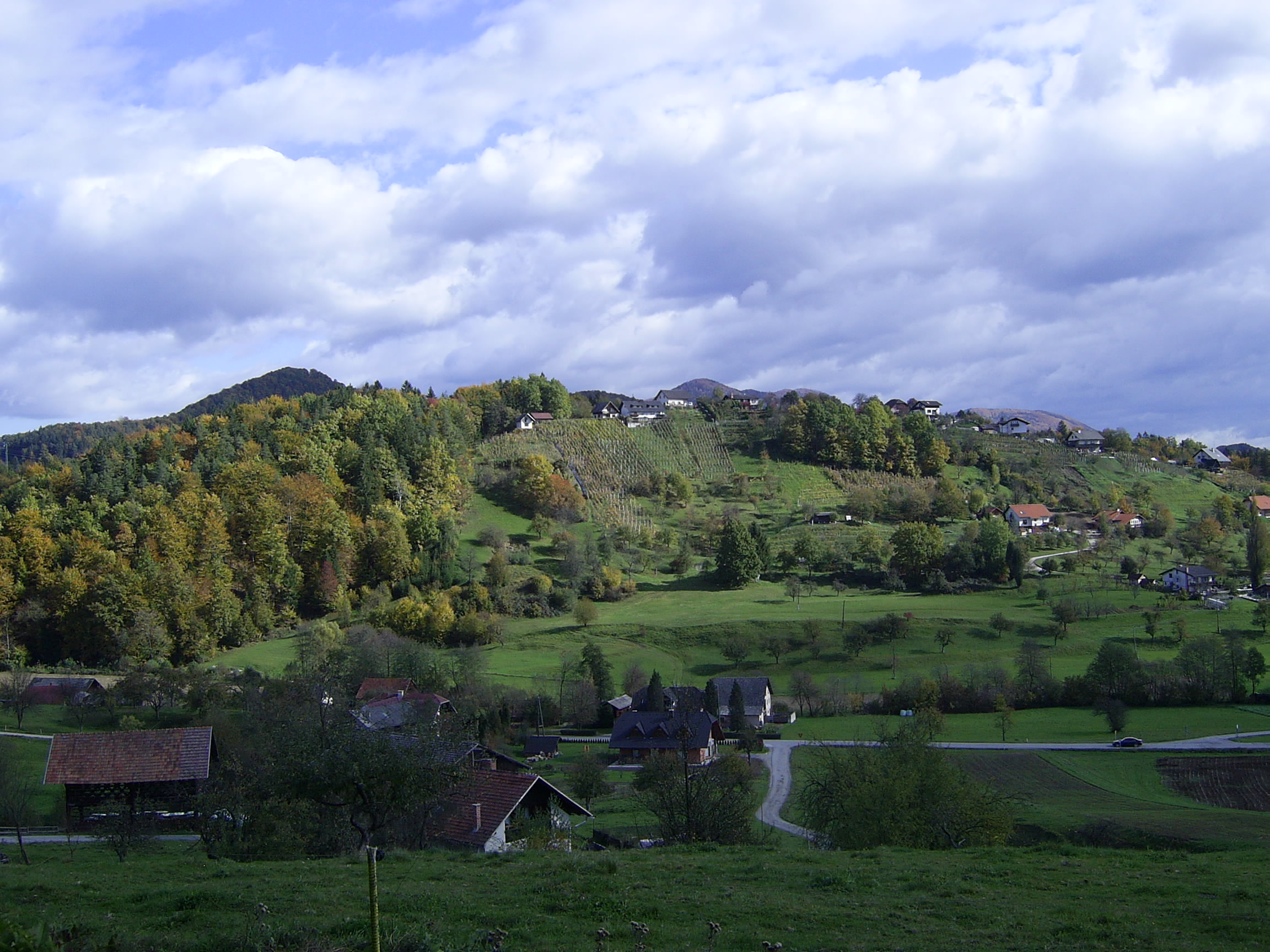

- Location in Slovenia
- Coordinates: 46°20′15.14″N 15°5′48.88″E
- Country: Slovenia
- Traditional region: Styria
- Statistical region: Savinja
- Municipality: Velenje

Area
  - Total: 1.7 km^{2} (0.66 sq mi)
- Elevation: 338.4 m (1,110 ft)

Population (2002)
  - Total: 164

Ložnica (pronounced [lɔˈʒniːtsa]) is a settlement in the Municipality of Velenje in northern Slovenia. It lies in the Ložnica Hills (Slovene: Ložničko gričevje) south of Velenje. The area is part of the traditional region of Styria. The entire municipality is now included in the Savinja Statistical Region.
