= Lipje, Velenje =

Lipje
- Location in Slovenia
- Coordinates: 46°21′17.06″N 15°9′43.35″E
- Country: Slovenia
- Traditional region: Styria
- Statistical region: Savinja
- Municipality: Velenje

Area
  - Total: 1.29 km^{2} (0.50 sq mi)
- Elevation: 505.1 m (1,657 ft)

Population (2002)
  - Total: 331

Lipje (pronounced [ˈliːpjɛ]) is a settlement in the Municipality of Velenje in northern Slovenia. The area is part of the traditional region of Styria. The entire municipality is now included in the Savinja Statistical Region.
