= Hrastovec, Velenje =

Hrastovec Sveti Bric (until 1955)
- Location in Slovenia
- Coordinates: 46°23′12.26″N 15°6′49.58″E
- Country: Slovenia
- Traditional region: Styria
- Statistical region: Savinja
- Municipality: Velenje

Area
  - Total: 1.21 km^{2} (0.47 sq mi)
- Elevation: 432.4 m (1,419 ft)

Population (2002)
  - Total: 289

Hrastovec (pronounced [ˈxɾaːstɔʋəts]) is a settlement in the Municipality of Velenje in northern Slovenia. The area is part of the traditional region of Styria. The municipality is now included in the Savinja Statistical Region.

== Name ==
The name of the settlement was changed from Sveti Bric (literally, 'Saint Brice') to Hrastovec in 1955. The name was changed on the basis of the 1948 Law on Names of Settlements and Designations of Squares, Streets, and Buildings as part of efforts by Slovenia's postwar communist government to remove religious elements from toponyms.

== Turn Castle ==
South of the settlement is a 13th-century castle known was Turn Castle (Slovene: Grad Turn). It was greatly rebuilt and remodelled over the centuries, with the last major building phase dating to the 18th century.
