= Pirešica =

- Location in Slovenia
- Coordinates: 46°20′43.05″N 15°9′40.91″E
- Country: Slovenia
- Traditional region: Styria
- Statistical region: Savinja
- Municipality: Velenje

Area
  - Total: 0.95 km^{2} (0.37 sq mi)
- Elevation: 379.1 m (1,244 ft)

Population (2002)
  - Total: 150

Pirešica (pronounced [ˈpiːɾɛʃitsa]) is a settlement in the Municipality of Velenje in northern Slovenia. The area is part of the traditional region of Styria. The entire municipality is now included in the Savinja Statistical Region.
