= Lipa (political party) =

Lipa (Lime Tree) or Party Lime Tree was a nationalist political party in Slovenia. The party took its name from the leaf of the lime tree, which has traditionally been an emblem favoured by the Slovenes.

The party was formed on 1 March 2008 after the Members of Parliament Sašo Peče, Barbara Žgajner Tavš and Boštjan Zagorac decided to quit the Slovenian National Party (SNS), following disagreements within the party. The party ran in the 2008 Slovenian parliamentary election and achieved only 1.82% of the vote, thus losing its seats in parliament. The party did not participate in the early 2011 Slovenian parliamentary election on 4 December 2011.

== Electoral performance ==
Election	Votes	%	Seats	+/–	Position	Government
2008	19,068	1.81	0 / 90	▲	▲9	
