= Črnova =

- Location in Slovenia
- Coordinates: 46°19′24.54″N 15°11′4.36″E
- Country: Slovenia
- Traditional region: Styria
- Statistical region: Savinja
- Municipality: Velenje

Area
  - Total: 3.78 km^{2} (1.46 sq mi)
- Elevation: 318.5 m (1,045 ft)

Population (2002)
  - Total: 318

Črnova (pronounced [ˈtʃəɾnɔʋa]) is a settlement in the Municipality of Velenje in northern Slovenia. The area is part of the traditional region of Styria. The entire municipality is now included in the Savinja Statistical Region.
