= Šmartinske Cirkovce =

- Location in Slovenia
- Coordinates: 46°23′48.99″N 15°9′25.08″E
- Country: Slovenia
- Traditional region: Styria
- Statistical region: Savinja
- Municipality: Velenje

Area
  - Total: 3.64 km^{2} (1.41 sq mi)
- Elevation: 734.7 m (2,410 ft)

Population (2002)
  - Total: 60

Šmartinske Cirkovce (pronounced [ʃmaɾˈtiːnskɛ ˈtsiːɾkɔu̯tsɛ]) is a dispersed settlement in the Municipality of Velenje in northern Slovenia. It lies in the hills above the right bank of the Paka River northeast of Velenje. The area is part of the traditional region of Styria. The entire municipality is now included in the Savinja Statistical Region.
