= Vinska Gora =

Vinska Gora Šent Janž na Vinski Gori (until 1955)
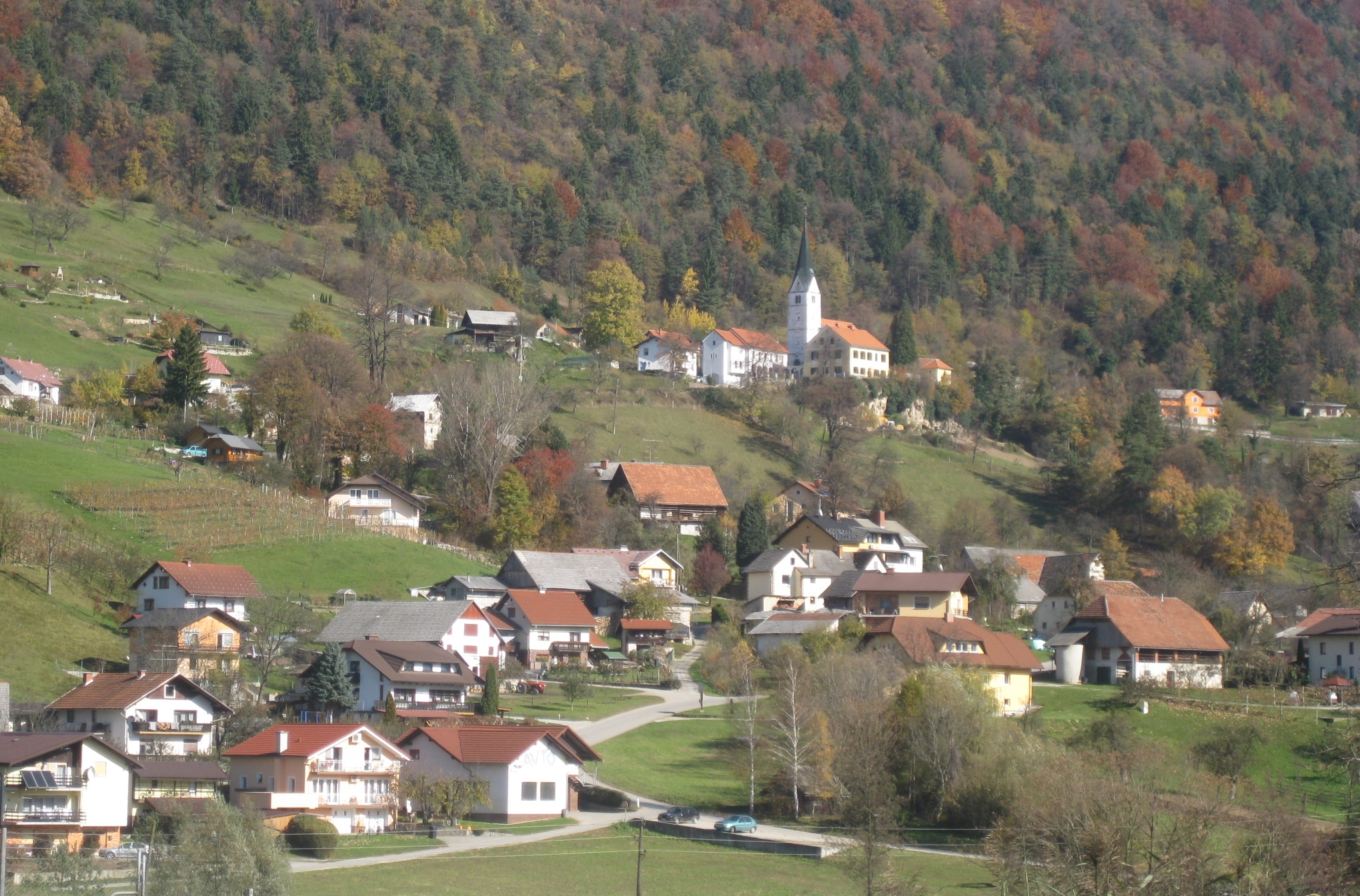

- Location in Slovenia
- Coordinates: 46°20′43.98″N 15°10′14.12″E
- Country: Slovenia
- Traditional region: Styria
- Statistical region: Savinja
- Municipality: Velenje

Area
  - Total: 1.23 km^{2} (0.47 sq mi)
- Elevation: 373.4 m (1,225 ft)

Population (2002)
  - Total: 361

Vinska Gora (pronounced [ˈʋiːnska ˈɡɔːɾa]) is a village in the Municipality of Velenje in northern Slovenia. The area is part of the traditional region of Styria. The entire municipality is now included in the Savinja Statistical Region.

== Name ==
The name of the settlement was changed from Šent Janž na Vinski Gori (literally, 'Saint John on Wine Mountain') to Vinska Gora (literally, 'Wine Mountain') in 1955. The name was changed on the basis of the 1948 Law on Names of Settlements and Designations of Squares, Streets, and Buildings as part of efforts by Slovenia's postwar communist government to remove religious elements from toponyms.

== Church ==
The parish church in the settlement is dedicated to John the Baptist and belongs to the Roman Catholic Archdiocese of Maribor. It was built in the 15th century with major rebuilding dating to the 19th century.
