= Prelska =

- Location in Slovenia
- Coordinates: 46°20′21.85″N 15°11′15.32″E
- Country: Slovenia
- Traditional region: Styria
- Statistical region: Savinja
- Municipality: Velenje

Area
  - Total: 1.66 km^{2} (0.64 sq mi)
- Elevation: 350.6 m (1,150 ft)

Population (2002)
  - Total: 250

Prelska (pronounced [ˈpɾeːlska]) is a settlement in the Municipality of Velenje in northern Slovenia. The area is part of the traditional region of Styria. The entire municipality is now included in the Savinja Statistical Region.
