= Janškovo Selo =

Janškovo Selo Selo (until 1953)
- Location in Slovenia
- Coordinates: 46°20′40.35″N 15°10′56.2″E
- Country: Slovenia
- Traditional region: Styria
- Statistical region: Savinja
- Municipality: Velenje

Area
  - Total: 3.11 km^{2} (1.20 sq mi)
- Elevation: 480.7 m (1,577 ft)

Population (2002)
  - Total: 158

Janškovo Selo (pronounced [ˈjaːnʃkɔʋɔ ˈsɛːlɔ]; Slovene: Janškovo selo) is a settlement in the Municipality of Velenje in northern Slovenia. The area is part of the traditional region of Styria. The entire municipality is now included in the Savinja Statistical Region.

== Name ==
The name of the settlement was changed from Selo to Janškovo selo in 1953.
