= Plešivec, Velenje =

Plešivec
- Location in Slovenia
- Coordinates: 46°24′35.53″N 15°6′19.79″E
- Country: Slovenia
- Traditional region: Styria
- Statistical region: Savinja
- Municipality: Velenje

Area
  - Total: 9.09 km^{2} (3.51 sq mi)
- Elevation: 584.9 m (1,919 ft)

Population (2002)
  - Total: 357

Plešivec (pronounced [plɛˈʃiːʋəts]) is a settlement in the Municipality of Velenje in northern Slovenia. It lies in the Mozirje Hills (Slovene: Mozirske planine) north of Velenje. The area is part of the traditional region of Styria. The entire municipality is now included in the Savinja Statistical Region.

The local church is dedicated to Saint Nicholas and belongs to the Parish of Velenje Saint Martin. It was first mentioned in written documents dating to 1328. The current building is Baroque from the 17th century.
