= Urban Municipality of Velenje =

Urban municipality of Slovenia

Urban Municipality of Velenje Mestna občina Velenje
- Urban municipality
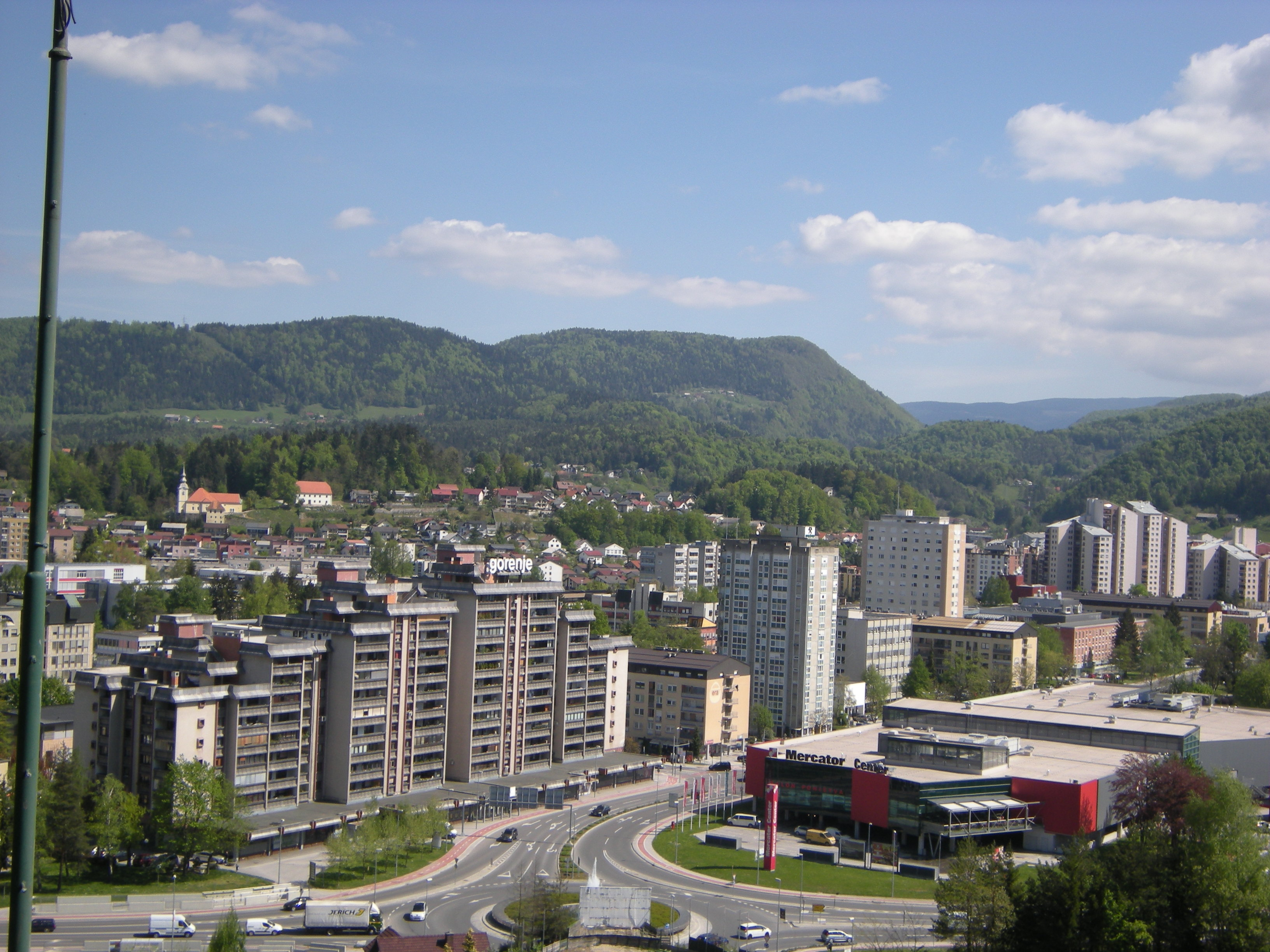

- Flag Coat of arms

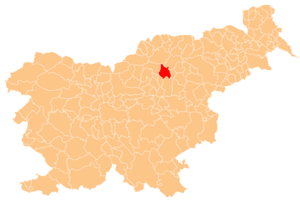
- Location of the Urban Municipality of Velenje in Slovenia
- Coordinates: 46°22′N 15°8′E
- Country: Slovenia

Government
  - Mayor: Peter Dermol (acting) (Independent)

Area
  - Total: 83.5 km^{2} (32.2 sq mi)

Population (July 1, 2018)
  - Total: 32,959
  - Density: 395/km^{2} (1,020/sq mi)
- Time zone: UTC+01 (CET)
  - Summer (DST): UTC+02 (CEST)
- Website: www.velenje.si

The Urban Municipality of Velenje (pronounced [ʋɛˈlɛːnjɛ]; Slovene: Mestna občina Velenje) is one of twelve urban municipalities of Slovenia. It lies in eastern Slovenia and was established in 1994. Its seat is the town of Velenje. The area traditionally belongs to the region of Styria and has been included in the Savinja Statistical Region since 1995.

== Settlements ==
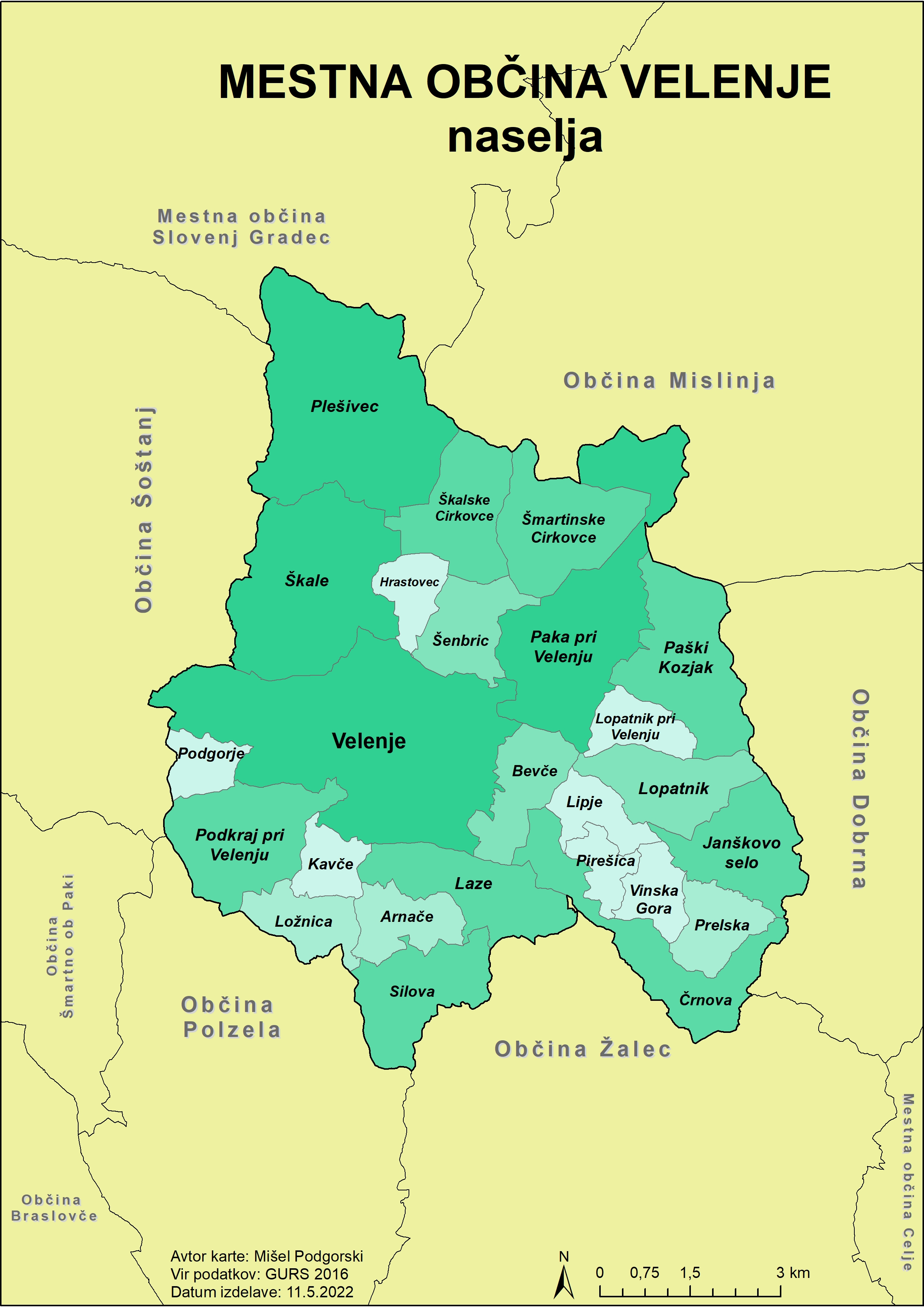
Villages in the municipality

In addition to the municipal seat of Velenje, the municipality also includes the following settlements:

- Arnače
- Bevče
- Črnova
- Hrastovec
- Janškovo Selo
- Kavče
- Laze
- Lipje
- Lopatnik
- Lopatnik pri Velenju
- Ložnica
- Paka pri Velenju
- Paški Kozjak
- Pirešica
- Plešivec
- Podgorje
- Podkraj pri Velenju
- Prelska
- Šenbric
- Silova
- Škale
- Škalske Cirkovce
- Šmartinske Cirkovce
- Vinska Gora
