= Kavče =

- Location in Slovenia
- Coordinates: 46°20′49.45″N 15°6′14.67″E
- Country: Slovenia
- Traditional region: Styria
- Statistical region: Savinja
- Municipality: Velenje

Area
  - Total: 1.17 km^{2} (0.45 sq mi)
- Elevation: 460.8 m (1,512 ft)

Population (2002)
  - Total: 447

Kavče (pronounced [ˈkaːu̯tʃɛ]) is a settlement in the Municipality of Velenje in northern Slovenia. The area is part of the traditional region of Styria. The entire municipality is now included in the Savinja Statistical Region.
