= Podkraj pri Velenju =

- Location in Slovenia
- Coordinates: 46°20′59.87″N 15°5′6.86″E
- Country: Slovenia
- Traditional region: Styria
- Statistical region: Savinja
- Municipality: Velenje

Area
  - Total: 3.43 km^{2} (1.32 sq mi)
- Elevation: 510.6 m (1,675 ft)

Population (2002)
  - Total: 626

Podkraj pri Velenju (pronounced [pɔtˈkɾai̯ pɾi ʋɛˈlɛːnju]) is a settlement in the Municipality of Velenje in northern Slovenia. It lies in the Ložnica Hills (Slovene: Ložničko gričevje) southwest of the town of Velenje. The area is part of the traditional region of Styria. The entire municipality is now included in the Savinja Statistical Region.

== Name ==
The name of the settlement was changed from Podkraj to Podkraj pri Velenju in 1955.

== Church ==
The local church is dedicated to Saint James (Slovene: sveti Jakob) and belongs to the Parish of Velenje–Saint Mary. It dates to the late 16th century and was rebuilt in the 17th and 18th centuries.
