= Podgorje, Velenje =

Podgorje
- Location in Slovenia
- Coordinates: 46°21′37.79″N 15°4′39.79″E
- Country: Slovenia
- Traditional region: Styria
- Statistical region: Savinja
- Municipality: Velenje

Area
  - Total: 1.08 km^{2} (0.42 sq mi)
- Elevation: 427.1 m (1,401 ft)

Population (2002)
  - Total: 158

Podgorje (pronounced [ˈpoːdɡɔɾjɛ]) is a settlement in the Municipality of Velenje in northern Slovenia. It lies in the foothills of the Ložnica Hills west of the town of Velenje, above the regional road from Velenje to Šoštanj. The area is part of the traditional region of Styria. The entire municipality is now included in the Savinja Statistical Region.
