= Lopatnik =

- Location in Slovenia
- Coordinates: 46°21′14.72″N 15°10′33.4″E
- Country: Slovenia
- Traditional region: Styria
- Statistical region: Savinja
- Municipality: Velenje

Area
  - Total: 2.71 km^{2} (1.05 sq mi)
- Elevation: 688.4 m (2,259 ft)

Population (2002)
  - Total: 36

Lopatnik (pronounced [lɔˈpaːtnik]) is a small settlement in the hills east of Velenje in northern Slovenia. The area is part of the traditional region of Styria. The entire Municipality of Velenje is now included in the Savinja Statistical Region.
