= Škale =

- Location in Slovenia
- Coordinates: 46°23′23.64″N 15°5′59.52″E
- Country: Slovenia
- Traditional region: Styria
- Statistical region: Savinja
- Municipality: Velenje

Area
  - Total: 6.7 km^{2} (2.6 sq mi)
- Elevation: 456.3 m (1,497 ft)

Population (2002)
  - Total: 843

Škale (pronounced [ˈʃkaːlɛ], German: Skalis) is a settlement in the Municipality of Velenje in northern Slovenia. It lies just north of the town of Velenje. The area is part of the traditional region of Styria. The entire municipality is now included in the Savinja Statistical Region.

The former parish church, dedicated to Saint George, was demolished on September 27, 1951 (when the bell tower was dynamited). A new smaller filial church dedicated to Saint Joseph was built in 1976 in a new location. It belongs to Saint Martin's Parish in Velenje.

== Notable people ==
- Josef Krainc (1821–1875), Austro-Hungarian lawyer, philosopher and politician of Slovene descent
