= Paka pri Velenju =

- Location in Slovenia
- Coordinates: 46°22′55.93″N 15°8′46.55″E
- Country: Slovenia
- Traditional region: Styria
- Statistical region: Savinja
- Municipality: Velenje

Area
  - Total: 7.03 km^{2} (2.71 sq mi)
- Elevation: 428.4 m (1,406 ft)

Population (2002)
  - Total: 398

Paka pri Velenju (pronounced [ˈpaːka pɾi ʋɛˈlɛːnju]) is a settlement in the Municipality of Velenje in northern Slovenia. The area is part of the traditional region of Styria. The entire municipality is now included in the Savinja Statistical Region.

== Name ==
The name of the settlement was changed from Paka to Paka pri Velenju in 1955.
