= Zgornje Tepe =

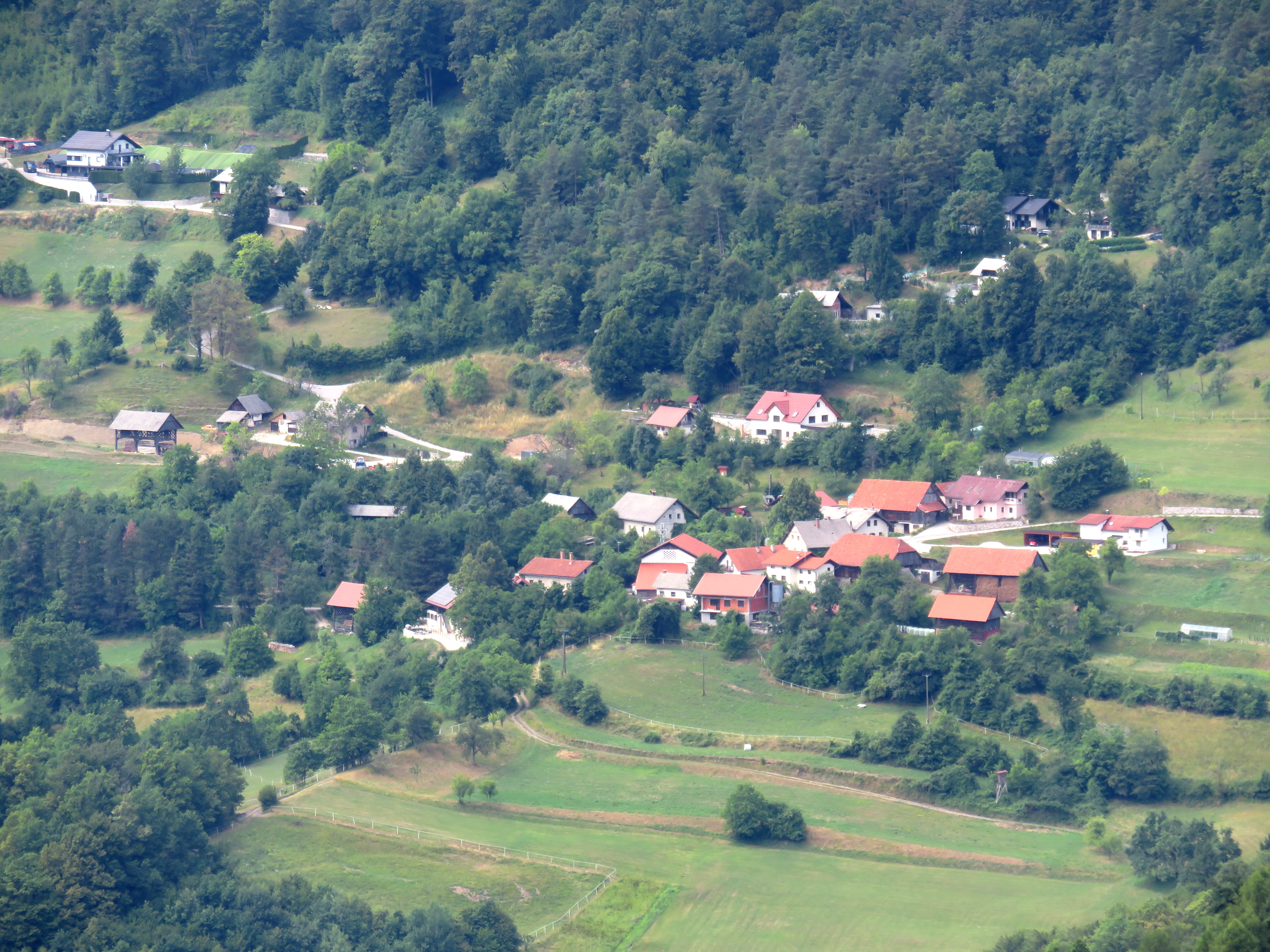

- Location in Slovenia
- Coordinates: 46°4′40″N 14°56′31″E
- Country: Slovenia
- Traditional region: Lower Carniola
- Statistical region: Central Sava
- Municipality: Litija
- Elevation: 479 m (1,572 ft)

Zgornje Tepe (pronounced [ˈzɡoːɾnjɛ ˈteːpɛ], German: Obertepe) is a former settlement in the Municipality of Litija in central Slovenia. It is now part of the village of Tepe. The area is part of the traditional region of Lower Carniola and is now included with the rest of the municipality in the Central Sava Statistical Region.

== Geography ==
Zgornje Tepe stands in the central part of Tepe, west of Žamboh and below the southern slope of Kleviše Peak (Slovene: Kleviška špica, 791 meters or 2,595 feet).

== Name ==
The name Zgornje Tepe means 'upper Tepe'. The settlement stands about 112 meters (367 ft) higher in elevation than neighboring Spodnje Tepe (literally, 'lower Tepe').

== History ==
Zgornje Tepe had a population of 49 living in 12 houses in 1900. Together with Spodnje Tepe, Zgornje Tepe was merged into a single settlement called Tepe in 1952, ending any existence it had as a separate settlement.
