= Goče =

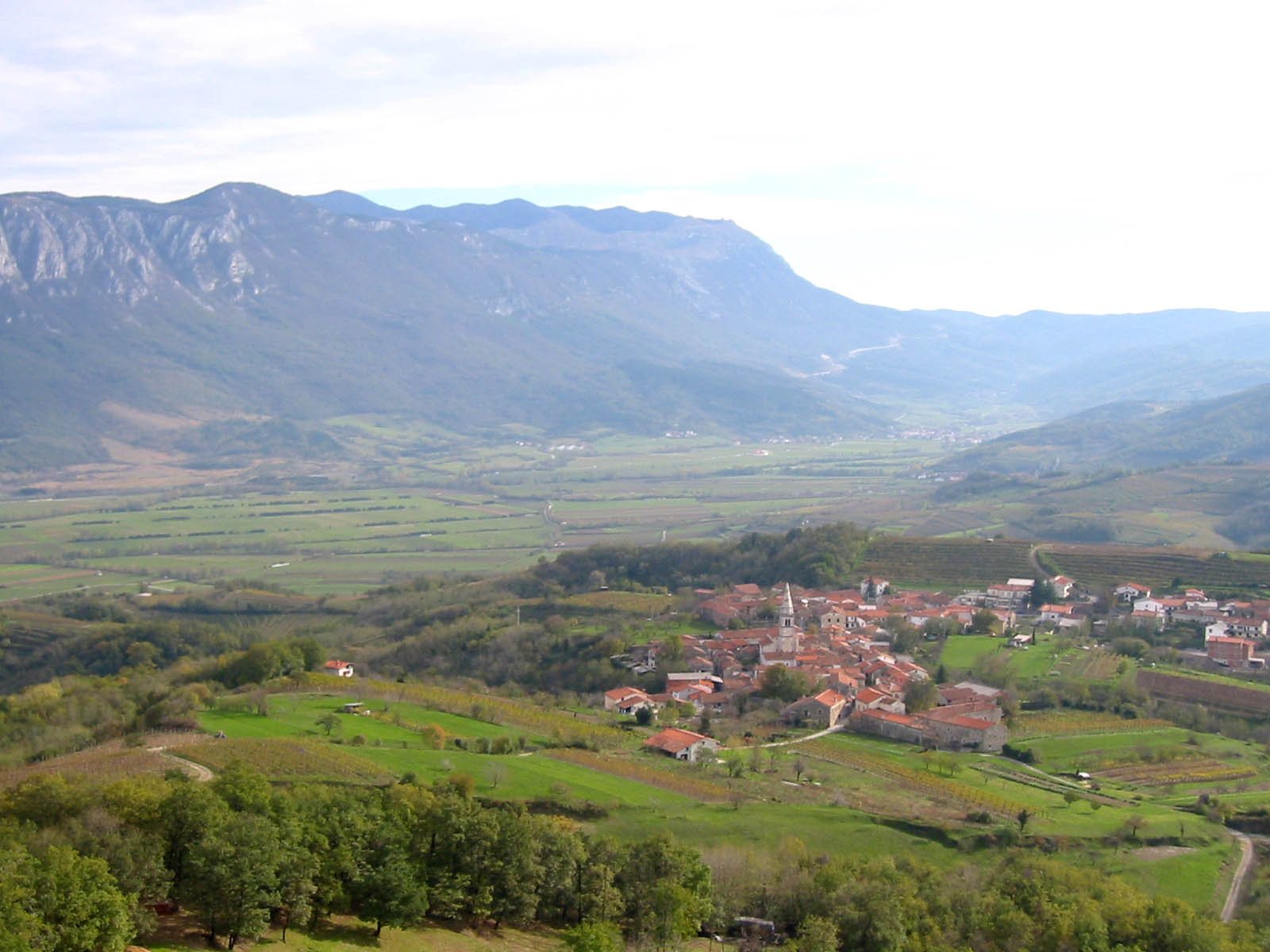

- Location in Slovenia
- Coordinates: 45°49′19.88″N 13°55′26.26″E
- Country: Slovenia
- Traditional region: Inner Carniola
- Statistical region: Gorizia
- Municipality: Vipava

Area
  - Total: 4.52 km^{2} (1.75 sq mi)
- Elevation: 275.1 m (903 ft)

Population (2002)
  - Total: 211

Goče (pronounced [ˈɡoːtʃɛ], German: Gotsche) is a village in the hills southwest of Vipava in the traditional Inner Carniola region of Slovenia. It is now generally regarded as part of the Slovenian Littoral. It includes the hamlets of Bešenca, Na Grofovem, Na Jagni, Pod Strmcem, and V Gasah. There are vineyards and wine cellars in the village.

== Name ==
The name Goče is derived from the personal name *Gotъ. Other Slovenian toponyms presumably based on this name are Gotenica, Gotna vas (a suburb of Novo Mesto), Gotovlje, and Gotenc. Locally, the name is pronounced Γûəče [ˈɦuːət͡ʃe], with the adjective form γûški [ˈɦuːʃki] and demonym Γučân [ɦuˈt͡ʃaːn].

== History ==
Goče was very wealthy in the past; this is indicated in part by houses with dates from the 17th and 18th centuries carved into their door casings. Near Saint Andrew's Church some of the old buildings are built so close together that the streets are barely 1 m wide. Oral tradition states that the houses were built so compactly because the land belonged to the church, exempting the residents from military service.

== Churches ==
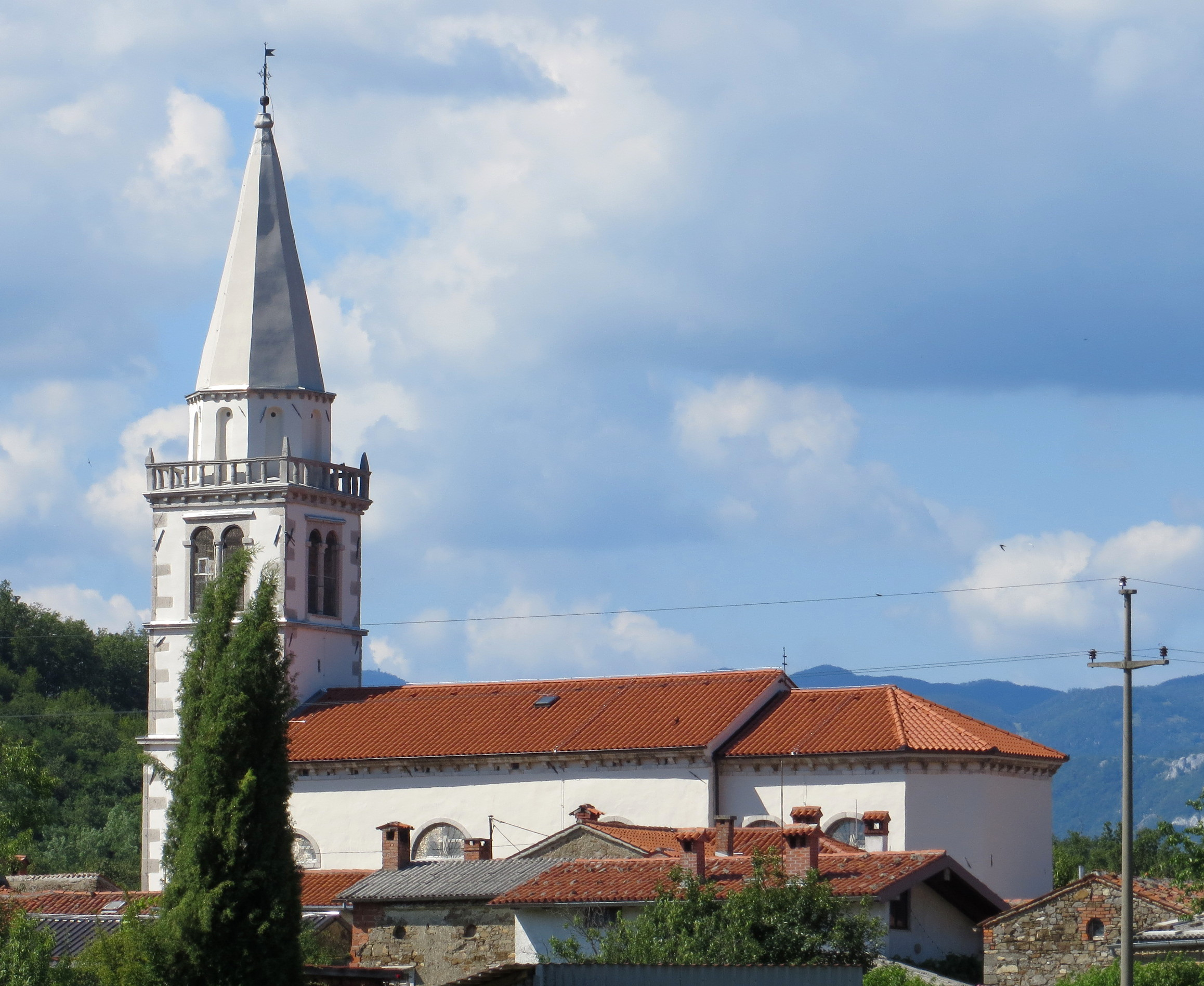
Saint Andrew's Church

The parish church in the settlement is dedicated to Saint Andrew and dates from 1630. It belongs to the Koper Diocese. A small church built on a hill above the village also belongs to this parish and is dedicated to Our Lady of the Snow. The bell tower contains a bell cast in Goče in 1706.

The village cemetery is south of the settlement. It has chapel dating from 1687 that is a prime example of the Karst Renaissance style. Between the church and the cemetery there is an altar-like wayside shrine from the end of the 17th century. Its relief carvings are heavily damaged.

== Notable people ==
Notable people that were born or lived in Goče include:

- Franc Ferjančič (1867–1943), writer
- Alfonz Furlan (1856–1932), local historian and religious writer
- Ivan Mercina (1851–1940), campanologist and composer
