= Gotenica =

- Village
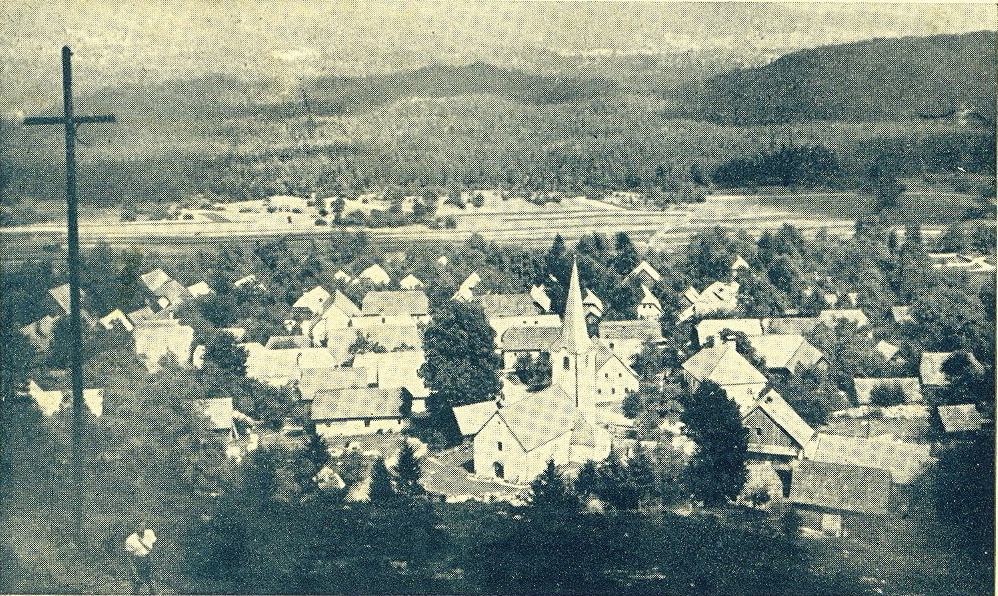
- 1941 postcard of Gotenica

- Location in Slovenia
- Coordinates: 45°36′42.53″N 14°44′49.72″E
- Country: Slovenia
- Traditional region: Lower Carniola
- Statistical region: Southeast Slovenia
- Municipality: Kočevje

Area
  - Total: 23.75 km^{2} (9.17 sq mi)
- Elevation: 658.9 m (2,162 ft)

Population (2012)
  - Total: 2
  - Density: 0/km^{2} (0/sq mi)
- Postal code: 1338

Gotenica (pronounced [ɡɔtɛˈniːtsa]; in older sources also Gotnica, German: Göttenitz, Gottscheerish: Gənize or In dr Gənizn) is a settlement in the Municipality of Kočevje in southern Slovenia. The area is part of the traditional region of Lower Carniola and is now included in the Southeast Slovenia Statistical Region.

== Geography ==
Gotenica is located in a clearing surrounded by wooded plateaus and hills: the Gotenica Mountains (Goteniška gora) to the west, with nearby Gotenica Mount Snežnik (Goteniški Snežnik, 1,290 meters or 4,230 feet) as its highest peak, the Big Mountains (Velika gora) chain to the north rising to 1,254 meters (4,114 ft), and the Stojna Ridge to the east rising to 1,072 meters (3,517 ft). It is connected by road to Kočevska Reka to the south and Grčarice to the north.

== Name ==
Gotenica was first attested in written sources in 1363 as Goteniz (and as Gotintz and Gotnickh in 1498, and Gattenitz in 1499). The name is believed to be related to the toponym Gotenc, both based on the personal name *Goten, in turn derived from *Gotъ. Other Slovenian toponyms presumably based on this name are Gotna vas (a suburb of Novo Mesto), Gotovlje, and Goče. Other theories suggests that the name is derived from the Slovene verb gatiti 'to accumulate, pile up', referring to a place where water accumulates during flooding, or from the Slovene noun kot 'closed valley, cirque'. It is unlikely that the name is connected with the Goths, as some have suggested.

== History ==
Gotenica is among the oldest villages in the Kočevje area that was established by Slovenes. It may have been established between 1315 and 1332 under Count Meinhard of Ortenburg (1280–1332). Later Gotenica was also settled by Gottschee Germans. In 1574 it had 12 farms divided into 24 half-farms, corresponding to a population between 110 and 120. In 1770 there were 68 houses in the settlement. A school was established in Gotenica in 1854. Before the Second World War, Gotenica had 108 houses and a population of 359, including 13 ethnic Slovenes. The economy of the village was based on farming, forestry, transporting sawn lumber, and beekeeping. Gotenica had a steam-powered sawmill, an inn, and a store. The German residents of Gotenica were evicted in December 1941. After the Second World War, in 1948 the village had a population of 138. In 1949 it was selected for the construction of an underground bunker system for Slovenia's military and political leaders. It was made part of a military exclusion zone and the remaining population was evicted. The village was sealed off until 1990 and it had no permanent residents during this time.

== Religious heritage ==
Gotenica had two churches, a chapel, and a cemetery, all registered as cultural heritage today, that were destroyed by Slovenia's communist government after the Second World War.

- The village church, dedicated to Saint Oswald, was mentioned in documents dating from 1363. It was one of the oldest churches in the Kočevje area. Around 1500 a walled enclosure was built around the church to protect locals from Ottoman raids. In 1839 the church was expanded. It was originally a chapel of ease belonging to the Parish of Kočevska Reka, but became a parish church in 1878 with the establishment of the Parish of Gotenica. The church had three altars; the side altars had paintings by Štefan Šubic dating to 1863, and the church also had a Gothic monstrance dating to 1571. The church was destroyed in the 1950s.
- A second church in the settlement was a pilgrimage church dedicated to Saint Leonard. It was built in 1652. It was a Romanesque structure with a rectangular nave and an polygonal chancel walled on three sides. The chancel had a barrel-vaulted roof, and the interior furnishings dated from the 17th to 19th centuries. The church was destroyed around 1950.
- A chapel in Gotenica was dedicated to Saint Margaret. It dated from the second half of the eighteenth century and was remodeled in 1893, when a nave was added to the building. The chapel was destroyed soon after 1947.
- The village cemetery, primarily containing Gottschee German graves, was located on the southern edge of the settlement. It was established in 1824, and the last burial took place in 1949. After this the cemetery was destroyed.
