= Gotna Vas =

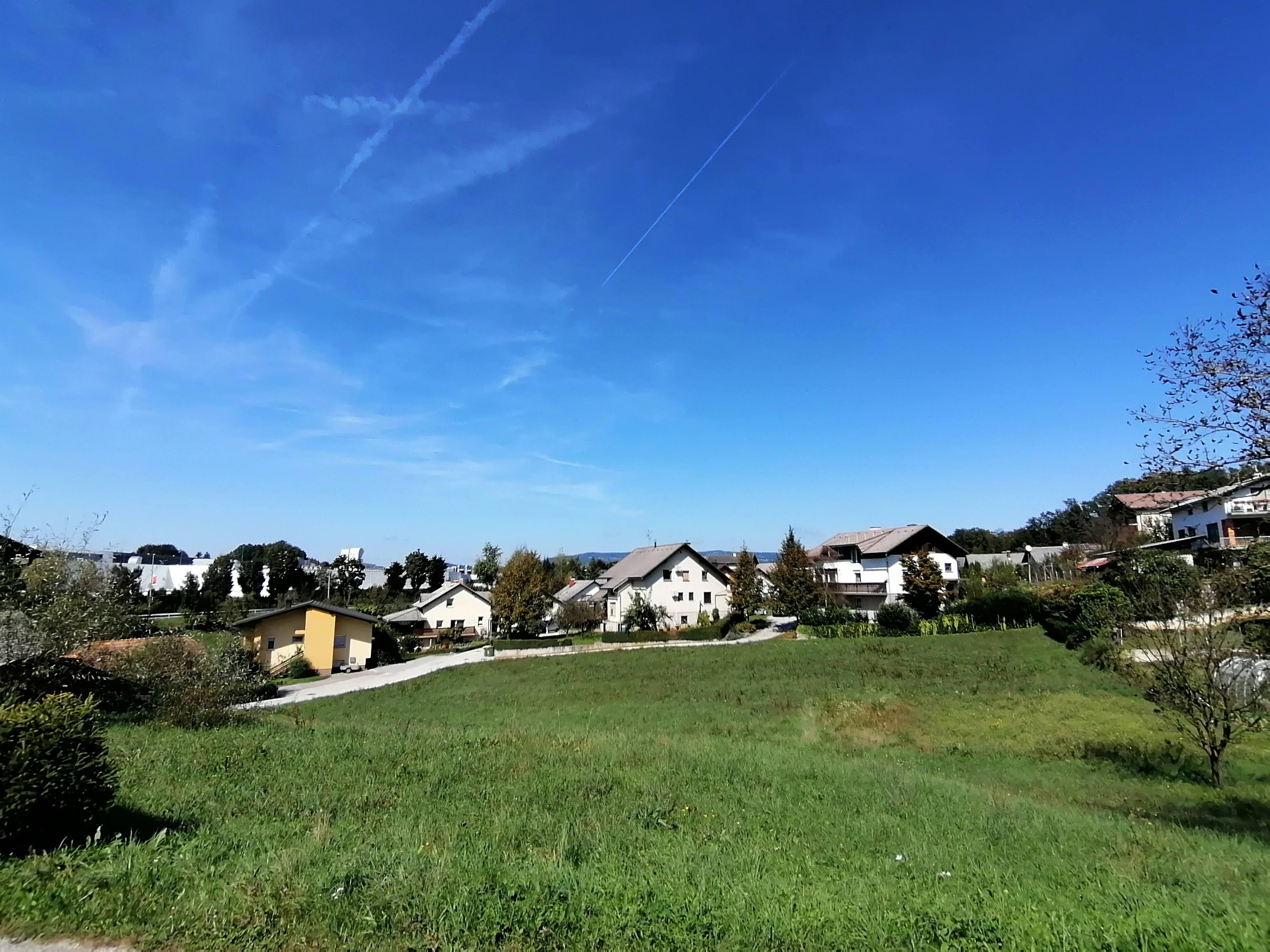

- Location in Slovenia
- Coordinates: 45°47′30″N 15°10′46″E
- Country: Slovenia
- Traditional region: Lower Carniola
- Statistical region: Southwest Slovenia
- Municipality: Novo Mesto
- Elevation: 201 m (659 ft)

Gotna Vas (pronounced [ˈɡoːtna ˈʋaːs], Slovene: Gotna vas, German: Gothendorf) is a former village in southeastern Slovenia in the Municipality of Novo Mesto. It is now part of the city of Novo Mesto. It is part of the traditional region of Lower Carniola and is now included in the Southeast Slovenia Statistical Region.

== Geography ==
Gotna Vas is a partially clustered settlement on a fertile plain southeast of the town center of Novo Mesto. It lies in the Gotna Vas Plain (Slovene: Gotensko polje) above Heavy Creek (Slovene: Težka voda), a tributary of the Krka River. It includes the hamlets of Cirkulane, Trnče, Jamovci, Banija, Brezje, and Ukrat.

== Name ==
Gotna Vas was attested in historical sources as Goͤznitz in 1357, Gottendorff in 1436, and Götzndorff in 1477. The name of the village is believed to derive from the Slavic personal name *Gotъ, referring to an early inhabitant of the place. Other Slovenian toponyms presumably based on this name are Goče, Gotenica, Gotovlje, and Gotenc.

== History ==
Gotna Vas had a population of 249 in 46 houses in 1880, 229 in 50 houses in 1900, and 229 in 55 houses in 1931. Gotna Vas was annexed by the city of Novo Mesto in 1979, ending its existence as an independent settlement.

== Church ==
The church in Gotna Vas is dedicated to Saint Leonard of Noblac. It was formerly surrounded by a cemetery. It is a simple structure with an octagonal chancel extending from an older nave and walled on five sides. The exterior west wall has remnants of a painting from the 17th century. The main altar was also created in the 17th century, and the two side altars date from 1899.

== Notable people ==
Notable people that were born or lived in Gotna Vas include the following:

- Franc Avsec (1863–1943), restoration expert, editor, and journalist
- Jože Bon (1910–1966), playwright
