= Koprivnik, Litija =

Koprivnik
- Location in Slovenia
- Coordinates: 46°3′58″N 14°58′14″E
- Country: Slovenia
- Traditional region: Lower Carniola
- Statistical region: Central Sava
- Municipality: Litija
- Elevation: 780 m (2,560 ft)

Koprivnik (Slovene pronunciation: [kɔˈpɾiːu̯nik], German: Kopriunik) is a former settlement in the Municipality of Litija in central Slovenia. It is now part of the village of Polšnik. The area is part of the traditional region of Lower Carniola and is now included with the rest of the municipality in the Central Sava Statistical Region.

== Geography ==
Koprivnik stands in the eastern part of Polšnik, on a side road off of the main road to neighboring Stranski Vrh.

== History ==
Koprivnik had a population of 27 living in five houses in 1880, and 35 living in five houses in 1900. Koprivnik was annexed by Stranski Vrh in 1953, ending its existence as a separate settlement. It was later reassigned to Polšnik.
