= Selo, Litija =

Selo
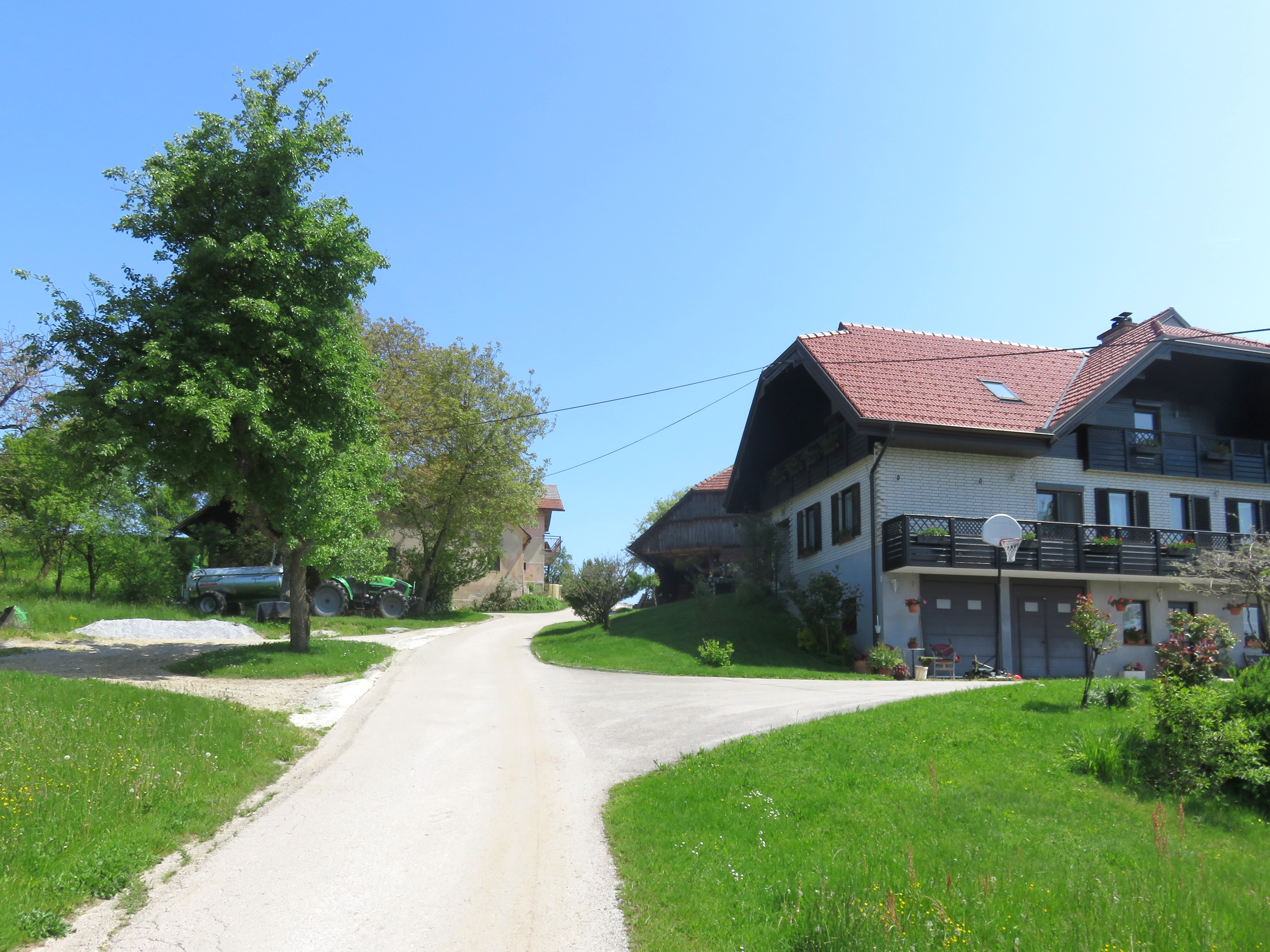

- Location in Slovenia
- Coordinates: 46°3′54″N 14°58′58″E
- Country: Slovenia
- Traditional region: Lower Carniola
- Statistical region: Central Sava
- Municipality: Litija
- Elevation: 777 m (2,549 ft)

Selo (pronounced [ˈseːlɔ]) is a former settlement in the Municipality of Litija in central Slovenia. It is now part of the village of Stranski Vrh. The area is part of the traditional region of Lower Carniola and is now included with the rest of the municipality in the Central Sava Statistical Region.

== Geography ==
Selo stands on a rise above the left bank of Sušjek Creek, southeast of Saint Lawrence's Church in Stranski Vrh.

== Name ==
The name Selo is derived from the Slovene common noun selo 'village, settlement'.

== History ==
Selo had a population of 71 living in 11 houses in 1880, and 65 living in 10 houses in 1890. Selo was annexed by Stranski Vrh in 1953, ending its existence as a separate settlement.
