= Sušje, Litija =

Sušje
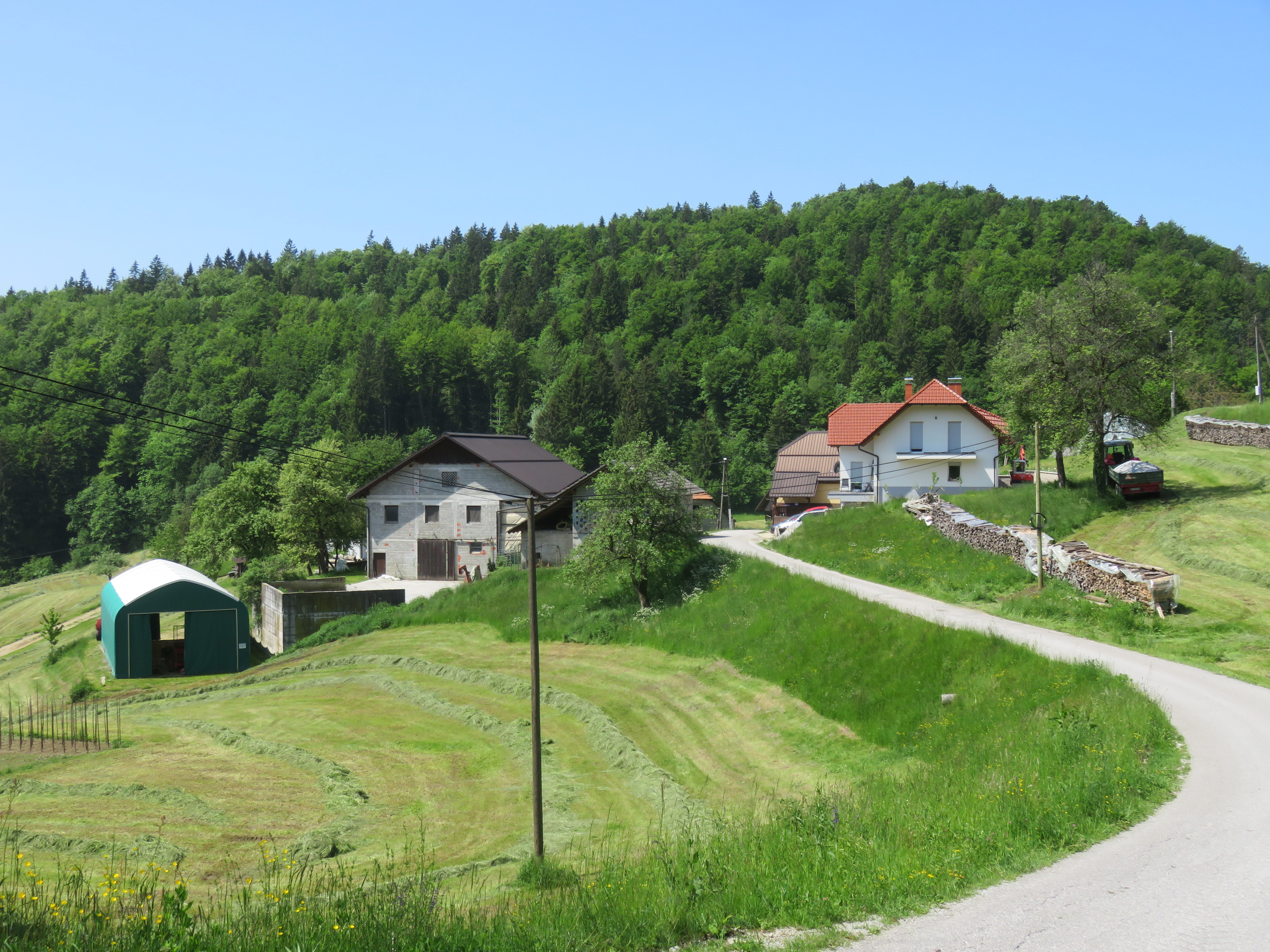

- Location in Slovenia
- Coordinates: 46°4′16″N 14°58′18″E
- Country: Slovenia
- Traditional region: Lower Carniola
- Statistical region: Central Sava
- Municipality: Litija
- Elevation: 731 m (2,398 ft)

Sušje (pronounced [suˈʃje], German: Schuschje) is a former settlement in the Municipality of Litija in central Slovenia. It is now part of the village of Stranski Vrh. The area is part of the traditional region of Lower Carniola and is now included with the rest of the municipality in the Central Sava Statistical Region.

== Geography ==
Sušje stands north of the source of Sušjek Creek, northwest of Saint Lawrence's Church in Stranski Vrh.

== Name ==
The name Sušje corresponds to the Slovene common noun sušje 'dry material', which is derived from the adjective suh 'dry'.

== History ==
Sušje had a population of 23 living in four houses in 1880, 19 living in three houses in 1890, and 15 living in three houses in 1900. Sušje was annexed by Stranski Vrh in 1953, ending its existence as a separate settlement.
