= Spodnje Tepe =

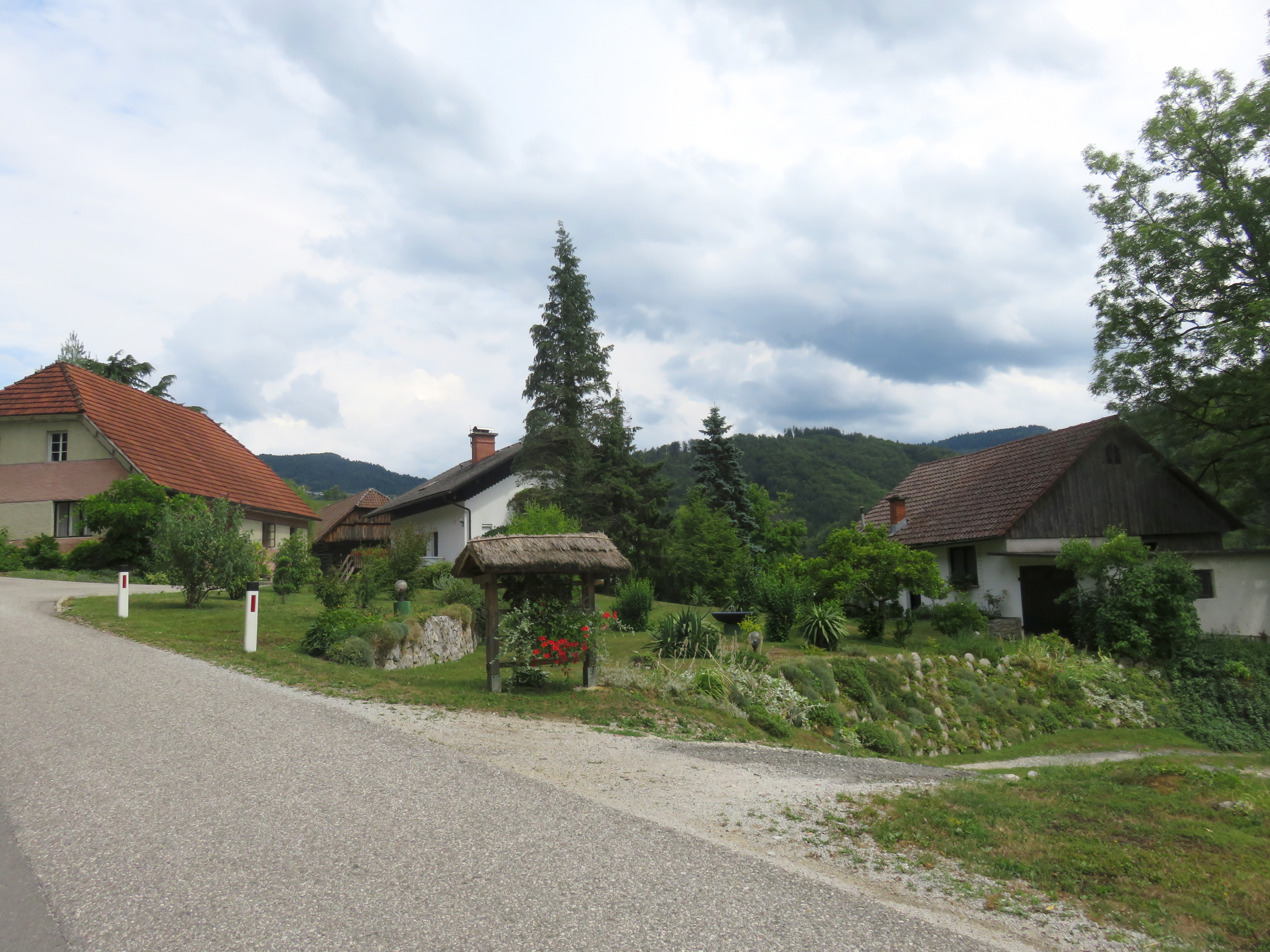

- Location in Slovenia
- Coordinates: 46°4′33″N 14°55′36″E
- Country: Slovenia
- Traditional region: Lower Carniola
- Statistical region: Central Sava
- Municipality: Litija
- Elevation: 367 m (1,204 ft)

Spodnje Tepe (pronounced [ˈspoːdnjɛ ˈteːpɛ], German: Untertepe) is a former settlement in the Municipality of Litija in central Slovenia. It is now part of the village of Tepe. The area is part of the traditional region of Lower Carniola and is now included with the rest of the municipality in the Central Sava Statistical Region.

== Geography ==
Spodnje Tepe stands in the western part of Tepe, west of Zgornje Tepe and below the southwestern slope of Kleviše Peak (Slovene: Kleviška špica, 791 meters or 2,595 feet).

== Name ==
The name Spodnje Tepe means 'lower Tepe'. The settlement stands about 112 meters (367 ft) lower in elevation than neighboring Zgornje Tepe (literally, 'upper Tepe').

== History ==
Spodnje Tepe had a population of 108 living in 15 houses in 1900. Together with Zgornje Tepe, Spodnje Tepe was merged into a single settlement called Tepe in 1952, ending any existence it had as a separate settlement.
