= Avsec =

Avsec is a surname. Notable people with the surname include:

- Franc Avsec (1863–1943), Slovenian Roman Catholic priest, restoration expert, editor, and journalist
- Mark Avsec (born 1954), American rock musician
