= Rodež =

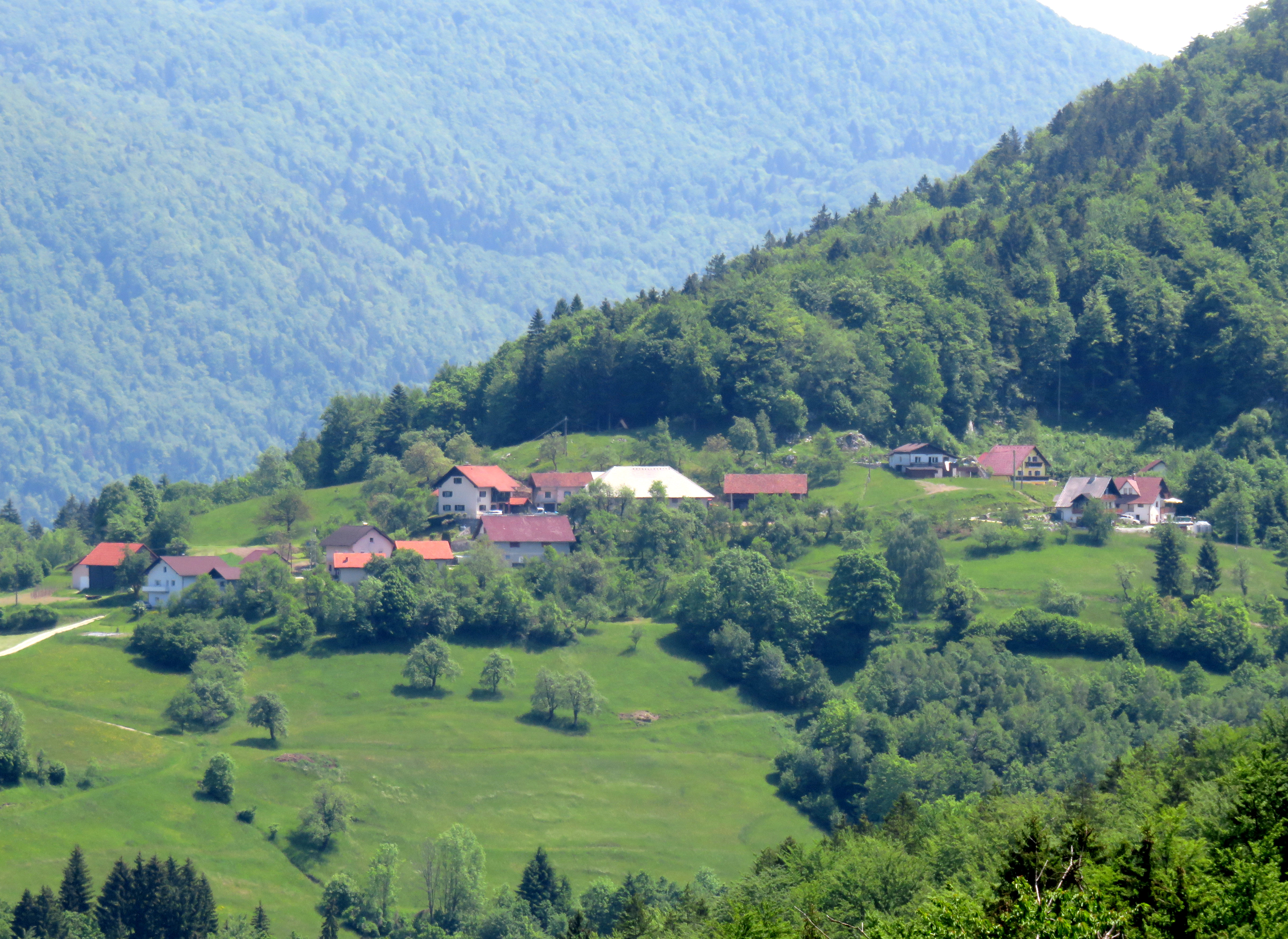

- Location in Slovenia
- Coordinates: 46°4′57.67″N 14°59′53.47″E
- Country: Slovenia
- Traditional region: Lower Carniola
- Statistical region: Central Sava
- Municipality: Zagorje ob Savi

Area
  - Total: 4.06 km^{2} (1.57 sq mi)
- Elevation: 702.9 m (2,306 ft)

Population (2002)
  - Total: 47
- Postal code: 1414

Rodež (pronounced [ˈɾoːdɛʃ]; formerly Sveti Lenart, German: Sankt Leonardi) is a village in the Municipality of Zagorje ob Savi in central Slovenia. The area is part of the traditional region of Lower Carniola. It is now included with the rest of the municipality in the Central Sava Statistical Region. The village includes the hamlets of Klenovik and Boriče.

== Name ==
The name Rodež is derived from the common noun *rodina 'uncultivated land, fallow land', referring to the local geography. It is etymologically related to toponyms such as Rodik, Rodine, and Rodni Vrh.

== Church ==
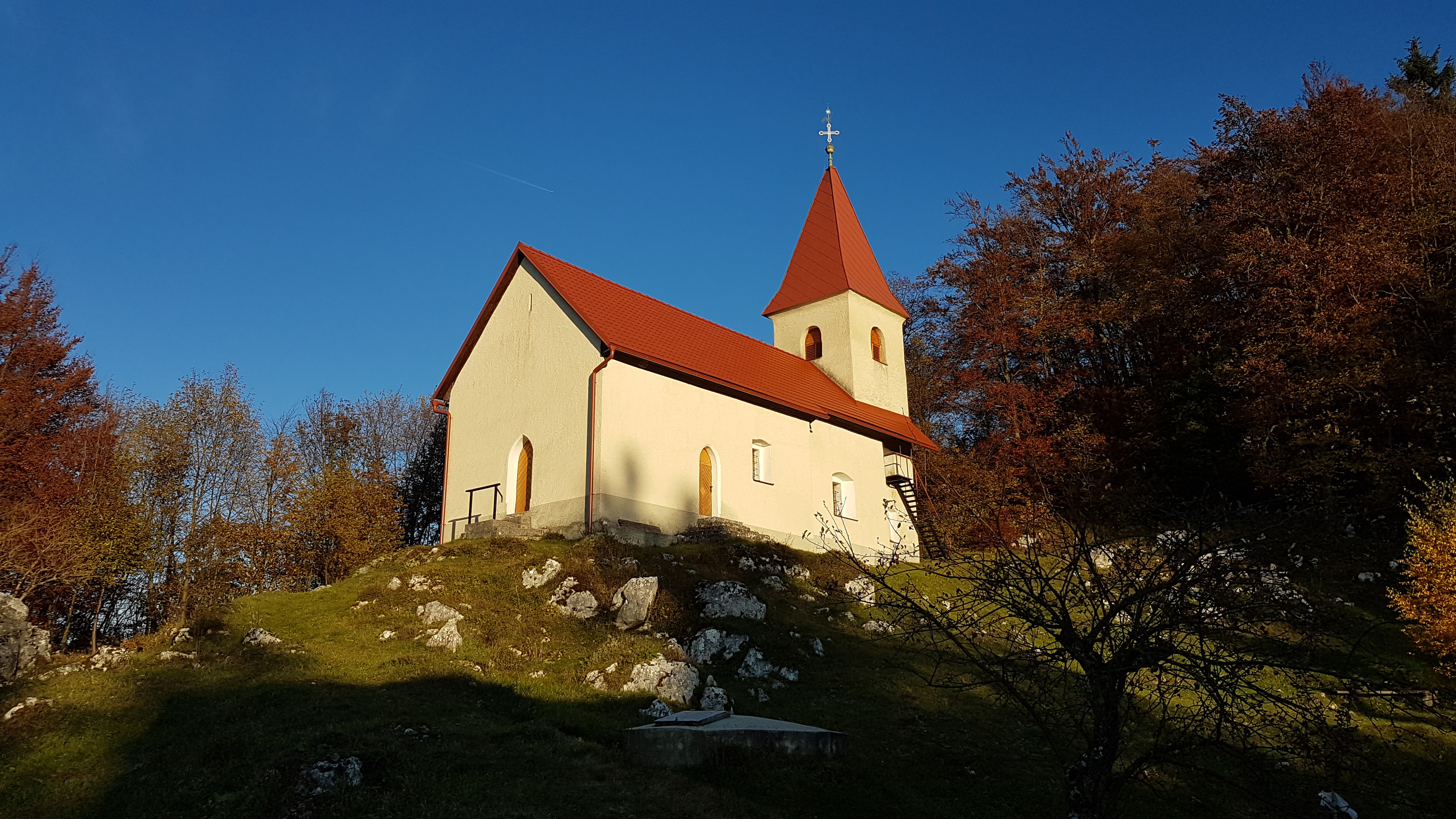
Saint Leonard's Church

The local church is dedicated to Saint Leonard and belongs to the Parish of Šentjurij–Podkum. It has a Romanesque nave dating to the 13th century onto which a new sanctuary was built after 1350. The belfry dates to the 16th century.
