= Spodnji Polšnik =

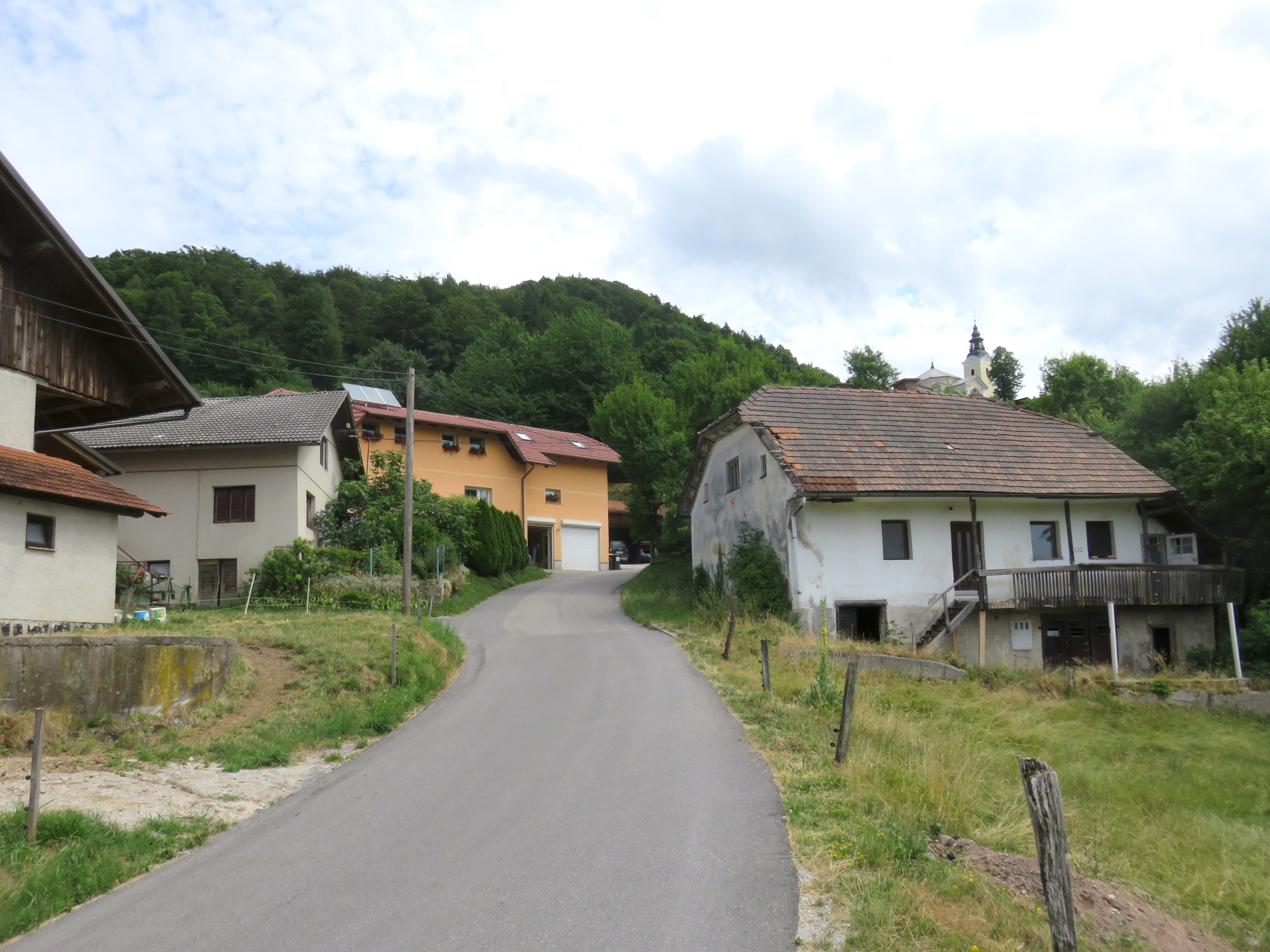

- Location in Slovenia
- Coordinates: 46°4′18″N 14°57′38″E
- Country: Slovenia
- Traditional region: Lower Carniola
- Statistical region: Central Sava
- Municipality: Litija
- Elevation: 614 m (2,014 ft)

Spodnji Polšnik (pronounced [ˈspoːdnji ˈpoːu̯ʃnik], German: Unterbillichberg) is a former settlement in the Municipality of Litija in central Slovenia. It is now part of the village of Polšnik. The area is part of the traditional region of Lower Carniola and is now included with the rest of the municipality in the Central Sava Statistical Region.

== Geography ==
Spodnji Polšnik stands in the northeastern part of Polšnik, on the road to Tepe.

== History ==
Spodnji Polšnik had a population of 133 living in 24 houses in 1900. Together with neighboring Zgornji Polšnik, Spodnji Polšnik was merged into the new combined settlement of Polsnik in 1953, ending its existence as a separate settlement.
