= Klenovik, Zagorje ob Savi =

Klenovik
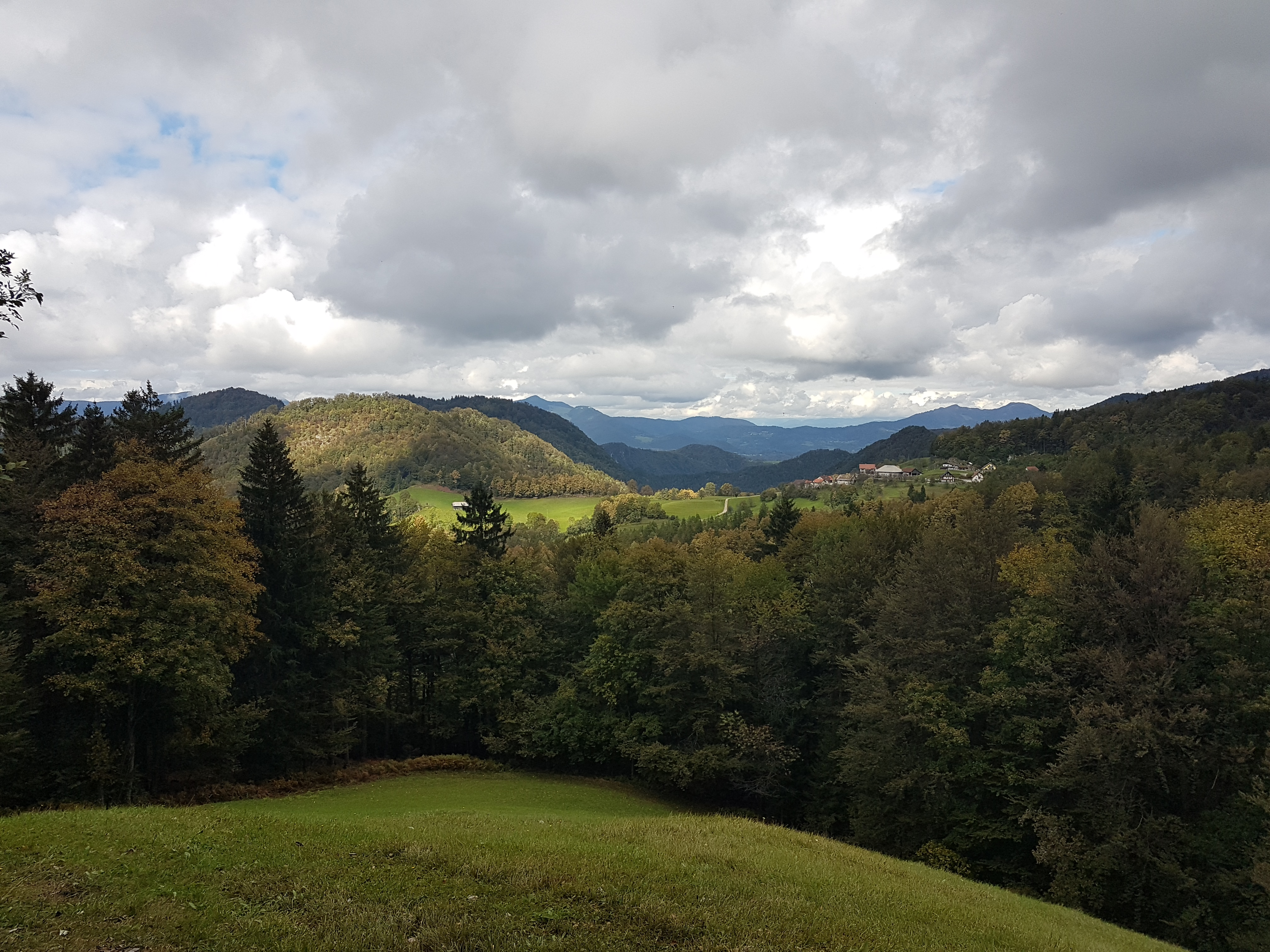

- Location in Slovenia
- Coordinates: 46°4′56″N 14°59′53″E
- Country: Slovenia
- Traditional region: Upper Carniola
- Statistical region: Central Sava
- Municipality: Zagorje ob Savi
- Elevation: 700 m (2,300 ft)

Klenovik (pronounced [ˈkleːnɔʋik], sometimes Klenovnik) is a former village in central Slovenia in the Municipality of Zagorje ob Savi. It is now part of the village of Rodež. It is part of the traditional region of Upper Carniola and is now included in the Central Sava Statistical Region.

== Geography ==
Klenovik is the core hamlet of the scattered settlement of Rodež. It stands below the north slope of Orljek Hill (elevation 895 meters or 2,936 feet).

== Name ==
The name Klenovik is derived from the common noun klen 'field maple', referring to the local vegetation.

== History ==
Klenovik had a population of 37 (in seven houses) in 1890, and—in a differently defined scope of the settlement—nine (in two houses) in 1900. Klenovik was annexed by Rodež in 1952, ending its existence as a separate settlement.
