= Polšnik =

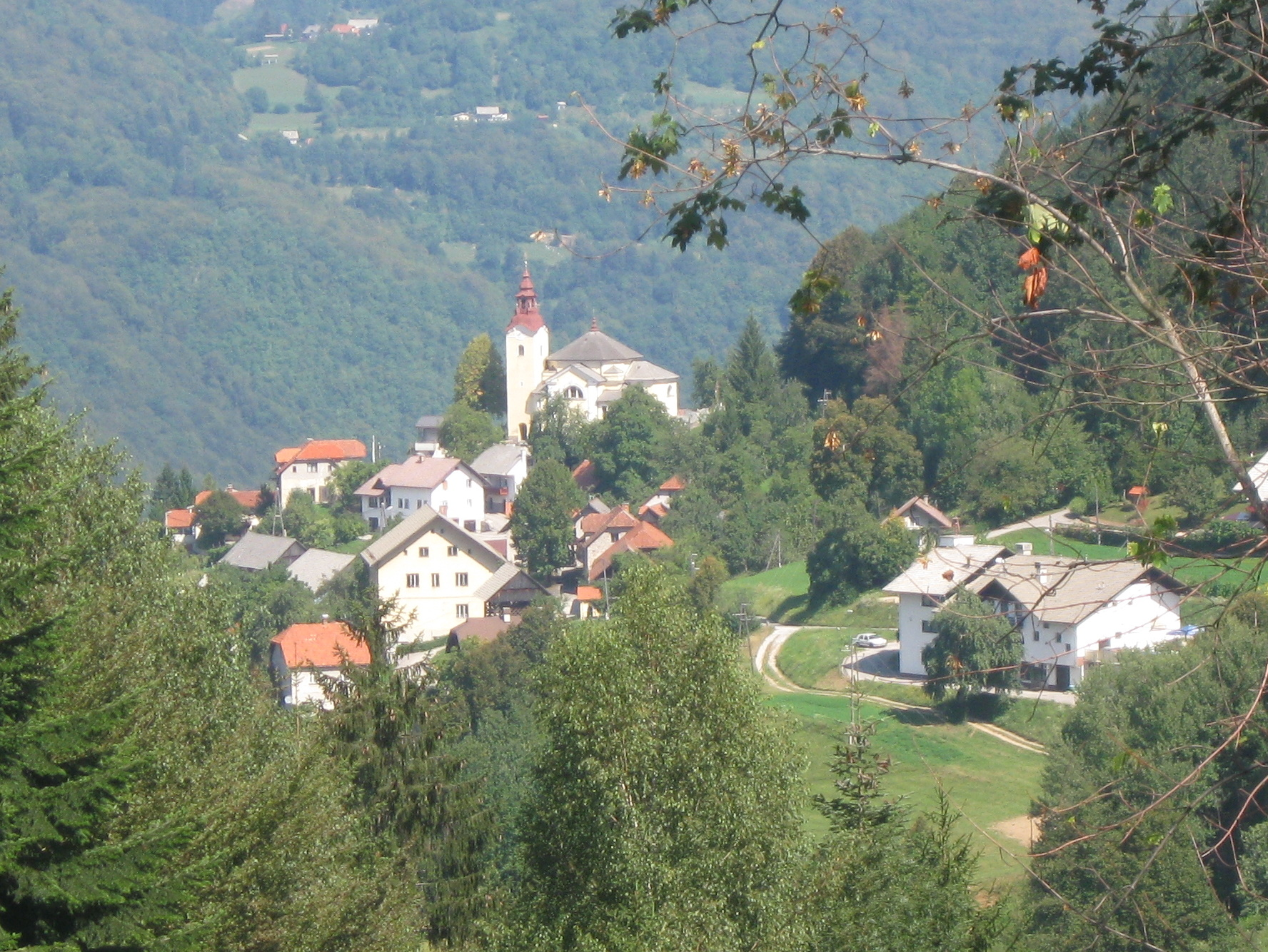

- Location in Slovenia
- Coordinates: 46°4′7″N 14°57′39″E
- Country: Slovenia
- Traditional region: Lower Carniola
- Statistical region: Central Sava
- Municipality: Litija

Area
  - Total: 8.08 km^{2} (3.12 sq mi)
- Elevation: 664.4 m (2,180 ft)

Population (2002)
  - Total: 122
- Postal code: 1272

Polšnik (pronounced [ˈpoːu̯ʃnik]; German: Billichberg) is a settlement in the Municipality of Litija in central Slovenia. The area is part of the traditional region of Lower Carniola. It is now included with the rest of the municipality in the Central Sava Statistical Region. Together with the two parts of the main settlement (Zgornji Polšnik and Spodnji Polšnik) it also includes the hamlets of Na Puši, Seruč, Koprivnik, Slop, Glinjek, Velika Njiva (Slovene: Velika njiva), and Sušje.

== History ==
Polšnik was created as a single settlement in 1953, when the previously separate villages of Spodnji Polšnik and Zgornji Polšnik were merged.

== Church ==
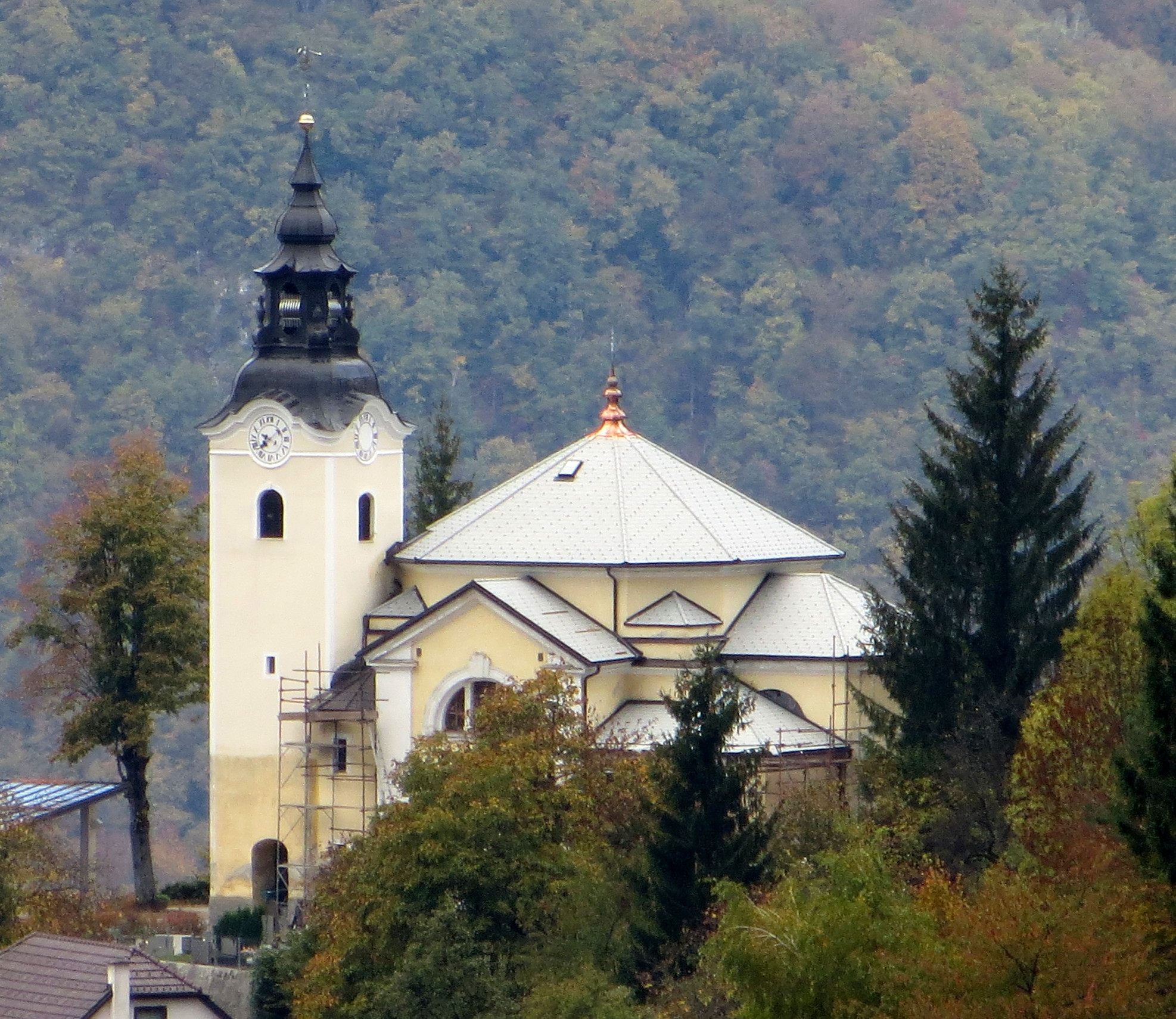
View from the south

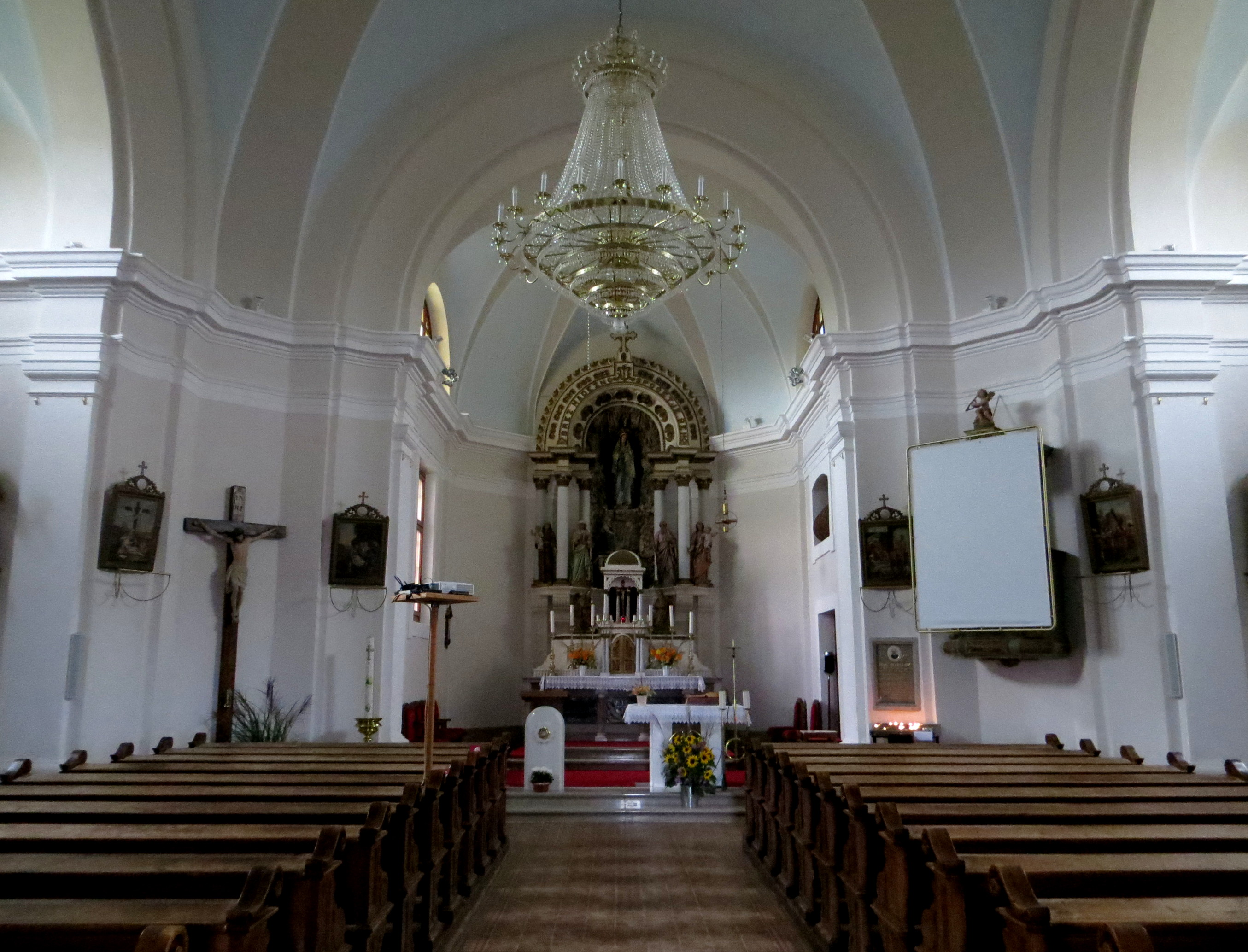
Church interior

Our Lady of Lourdes Church

The local parish church is dedicated to Our Lady of Lourdes and belongs to the Roman Catholic Archdiocese of Ljubljana. It was designed by Franc Avsec and built in 1904 with an octagonal nave. A second church, built on Glinjek Hill (828 m) south of the main settlement, belongs to the same parish. It is dedicated to Saint George (Slovene: sveti Jurij) and originally dates to the 13th century. It was restyled in the 19th century, but retains some of its original features.
