= Žamboh =

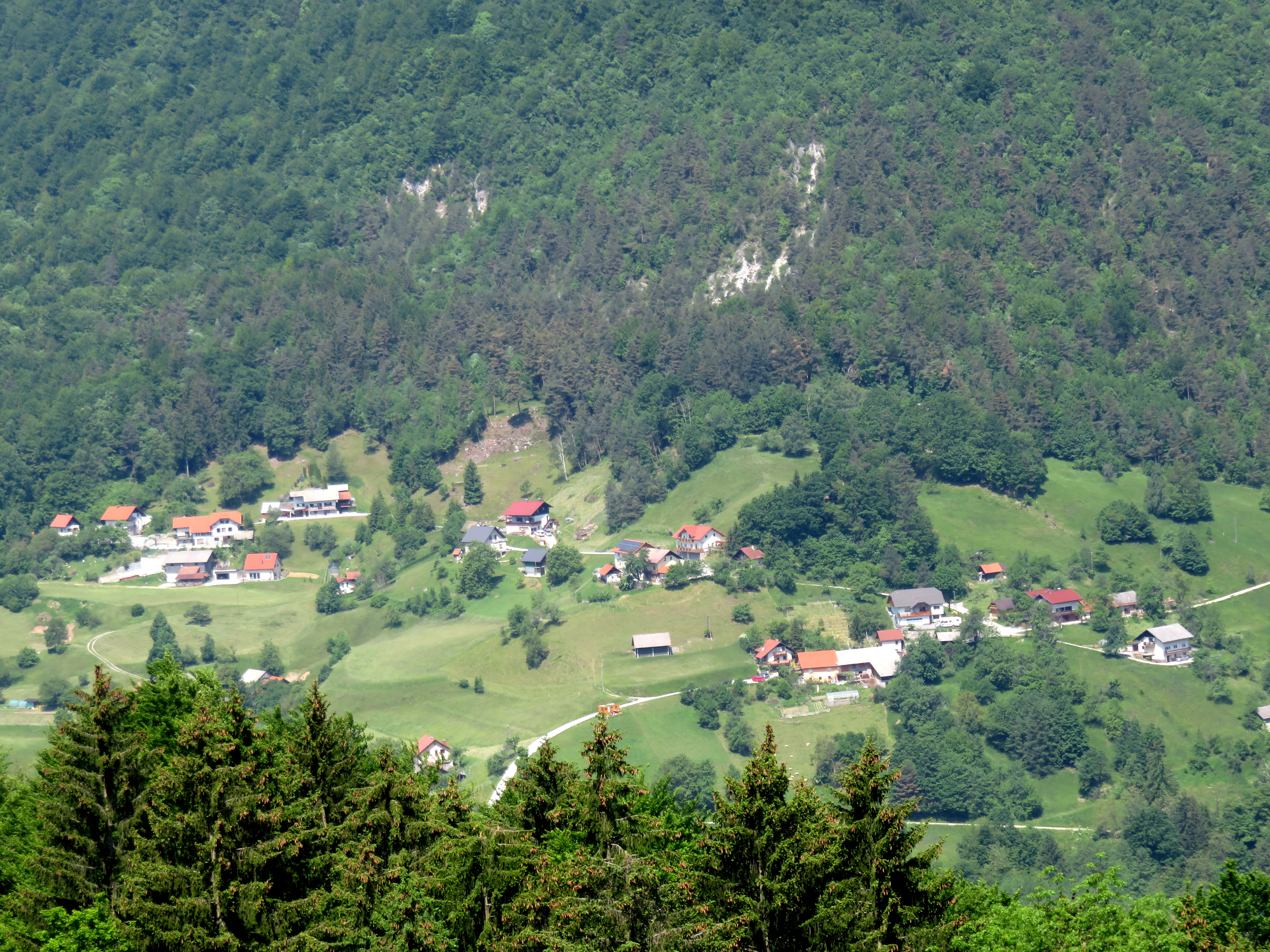

- Location in Slovenia
- Coordinates: 46°4′43″N 14°57′11″E
- Country: Slovenia
- Traditional region: Lower Carniola
- Statistical region: Central Sava
- Municipality: Litija
- Elevation: 488 m (1,601 ft)

Žamboh (pronounced [ˈʒaːmbɔx], German: Schamboch) is a former settlement in the Municipality of Litija in central Slovenia. It is now part of the village of Tepe. The area is part of the traditional region of Lower Carniola and is now included with the rest of the municipality in the Central Sava Statistical Region.

== Geography ==
Žamboh stands in the eastern part of Tepe, below the southeast slope of Kleviše Peak (Slovene: Kleviška špica, 791 meters or 2,595 feet). Žamboh Hill (738 meters or 2,421 feet), which shares its name with the former village, rises to the northwest.

== History ==
Žamboh had a population of 27 living in six houses in 1880, 17 living in 11 houses in 1890, and 33 living in 10 houses in 1900. Žamboh was annexed by Tepe in 1953, ending its existence as a separate settlement.
