= Velike Brusnice =

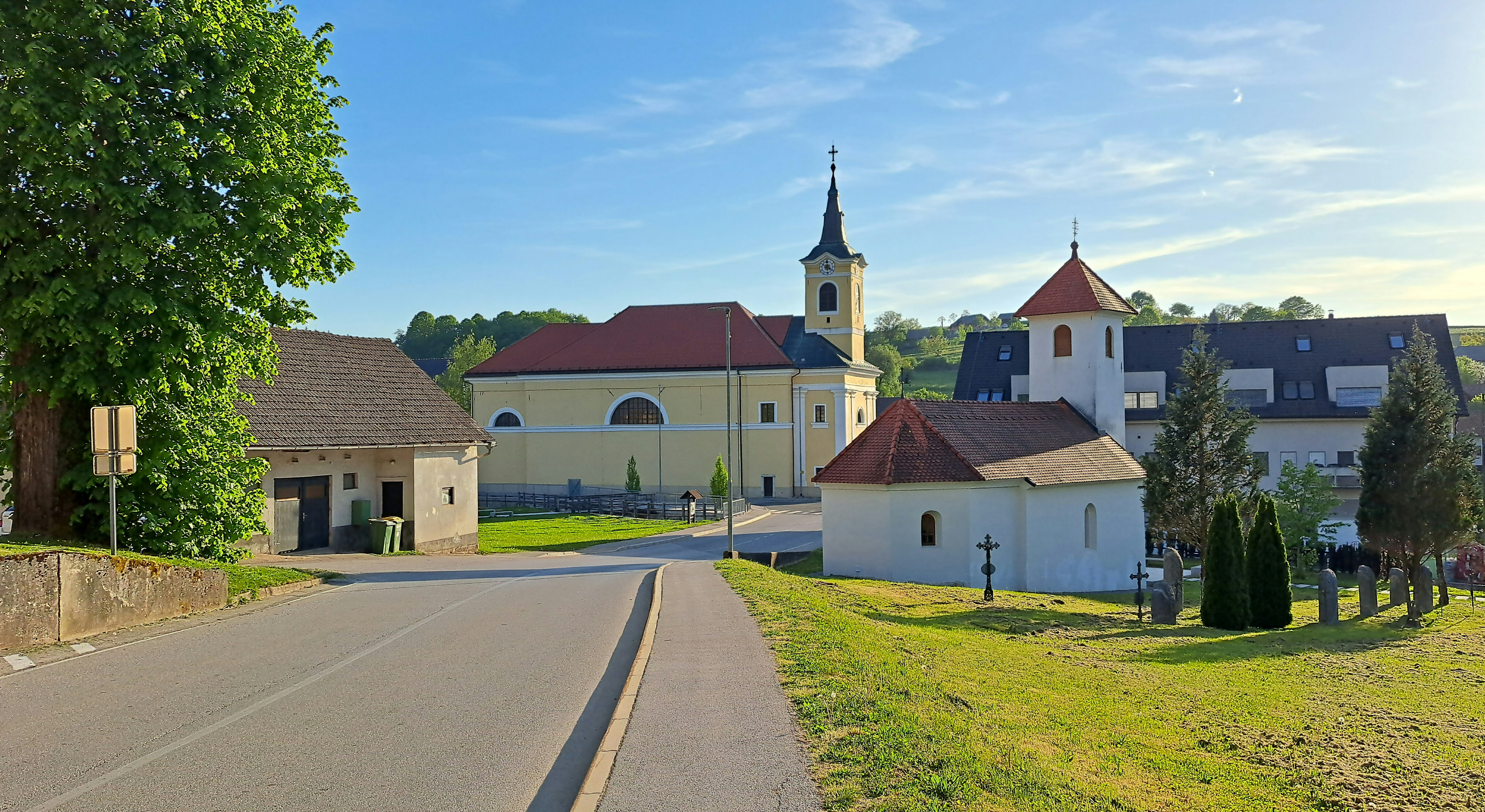

- Location in Slovenia
- Coordinates: 45°48′35.09″N 15°15′40.72″E
- Country: Slovenia
- Traditional region: Lower Carniola
- Statistical region: Southeast Slovenia
- Municipality: Novo Mesto

Area
  - Total: 3.927 km^{2} (1.516 sq mi)
- Elevation: 251.6 m (825 ft)

Population (2026)
  - Total: 563
  - Density: 143/km^{2} (370/sq mi)
- Postal code: 8000

Velike Brusnice (pronounced [ˈʋeːlikɛ bɾuˈsniːtsɛ]) is a settlement at the foothills of the Gorjanci range to the east of Novo Mesto in southeastern Slovenia. The entire City Municipality of Novo Mesto is part of the traditional region of Lower Carniola and is now included in the Southeast Slovenia Statistical Region. In January 2026, the population was 563.

The parish church in the village is dedicated to the Holy Cross and belongs to the Roman Catholic Diocese of Novo Mesto. It was built in 1846 in the Baroque style. The restoration expert Franc Avsec served as parish priest here from 1899 to 1900. A second church in the settlement is dedicated to the Holy Family. It is a Romanesque building with a mid-15th-century wall painting of Saint Christopher on the south exterior wall of the nave. It was extended in the late 16th to early 17th centuries.
