= Zgornji Polšnik =

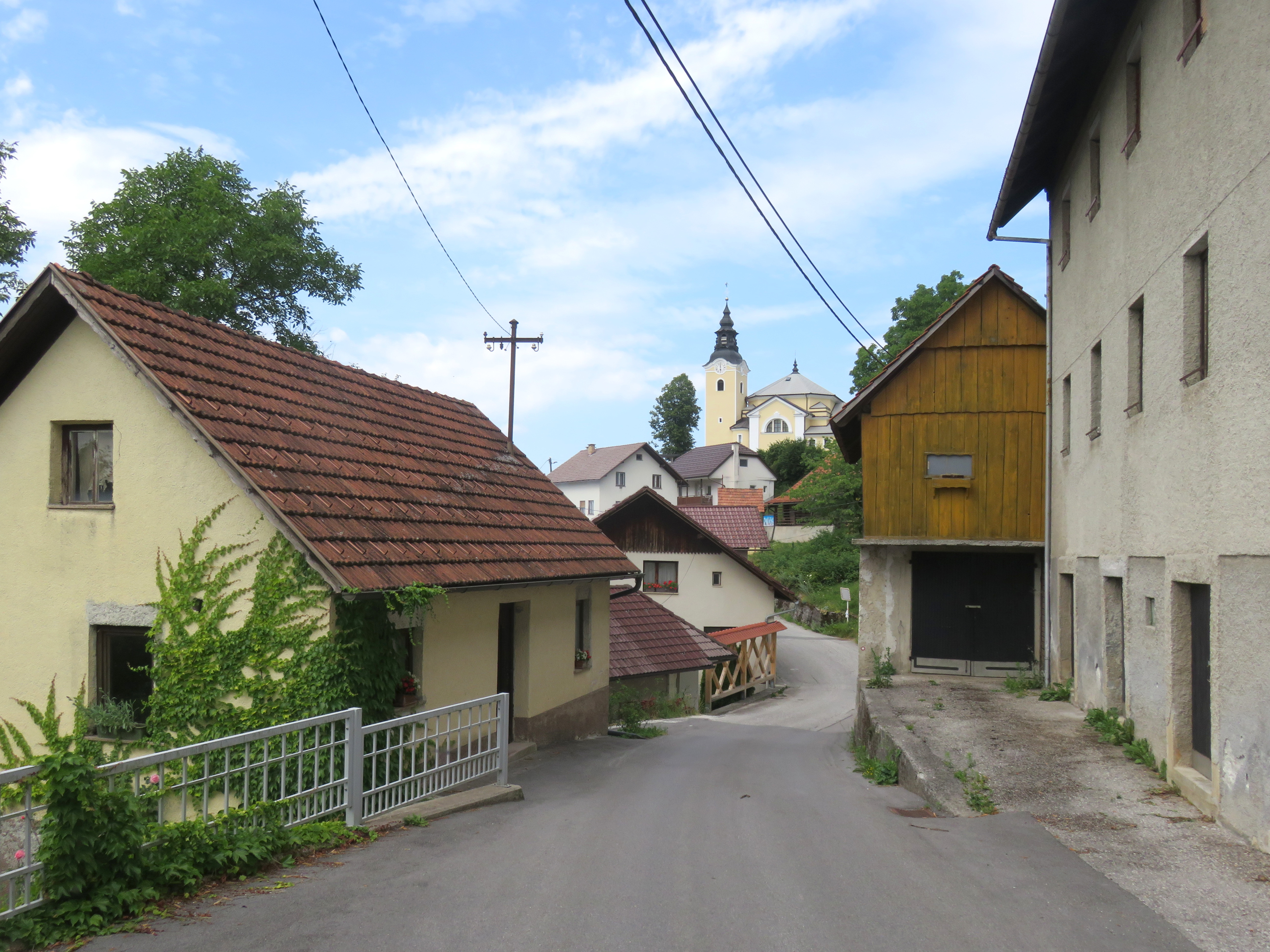

- Location in Slovenia
- Coordinates: 46°4′7″N 14°57′41″E
- Country: Slovenia
- Traditional region: Lower Carniola
- Statistical region: Central Sava
- Municipality: Litija
- Elevation: 663 m (2,175 ft)

Zgornji Polšnik (pronounced [ˈzɡoːɾnji ˈpoːu̯ʃnik], German: Oberbillichberg) is a former settlement in the Municipality of Litija in central Slovenia. It is now part of the village of Polšnik. The area is part of the traditional region of Lower Carniola and is now included with the rest of the municipality in the Central Sava Statistical Region.

== Geography ==
Zgornji Polšnik stands in the eastern part of Polšnik.

== History ==
Zgornji Polšnik had a population of 150 living in 25 houses in 1900. Together with neighboring Spodnji Polšnik, Zgornji Polšnik was merged into the new combined settlement of Polsnik in 1953, ending its existence as a separate settlement.
