= Franc Avsec =

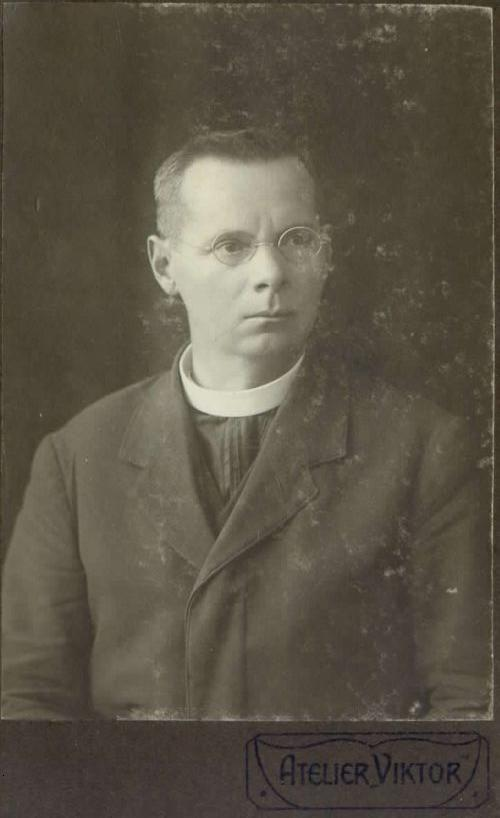
Franc Avsec in 1923

Franc Avsec (20 August 1863, Gotna Vas – 9 March 1943, Lesce) was a Slovenian Roman Catholic priest, restoration expert, editor, and journalist.

== Life ==
Avsec attended secondary school in Novo Mesto. He studied theology in Ljubljana and was ordained in 1888. After his ordination he served as a curate in various locations, and then starting in 1899 as a parish priest in Velike Brusnice, from 1900 to 1919 in Podkum, and then until his death in Lesce. He developed an interest in church art as a student. In the locations where he served, he drew plans of the churches, and studied the history of the buildings and conservation issues. In 1904 he was named an honorary conservation expert for the Vienna Central Commission for the Preservation of Monuments (K. K. Zentralkommission für Denkmalpflege); in 1913 he became a trustee of the Provincial Conservation Office for Carniola and later for the Historical Monuments Office for Slovenia. The valuable material he collected is kept at the Archepiscopal Archives of Ljubljana and the Institute for the Protection of Cultural Heritage of Slovenia.

== Work ==
Avsec published the articles “Pogled na cerkvene umetnine in nasvet” (A View on Church Art and a Recommendation, 1898) and “Stara kartuzijanska cerkev v Pleterjah” (The Old Carthusian Church in Pleterje, 1907) in the periodical Izvestju društva za krščansko umetnost (Newsletter of the Christian Arts Society). In addition he inventoried and sketched historical buildings; he measured and sketched several hundred churches, including all the churches in Ljubljana, the Zagreb Cathedral, the major churches in Kranj and the vicinity, all of the churches in the Radovljica area, the cathedral in Gornji Grad, and elsewhere.

He edited the temperance newsletter Piščalka (The Whistle, 1905–1906, vol. 5 onwards) and wrote articles for it. He also published the brochure Proti alkoholu – brez dvoma! (Against Alcohol: Without Doubt!; 1906). In addition, he applied his efforts to building cisterns, waterworks, and roads.
