= Stranski Vrh =

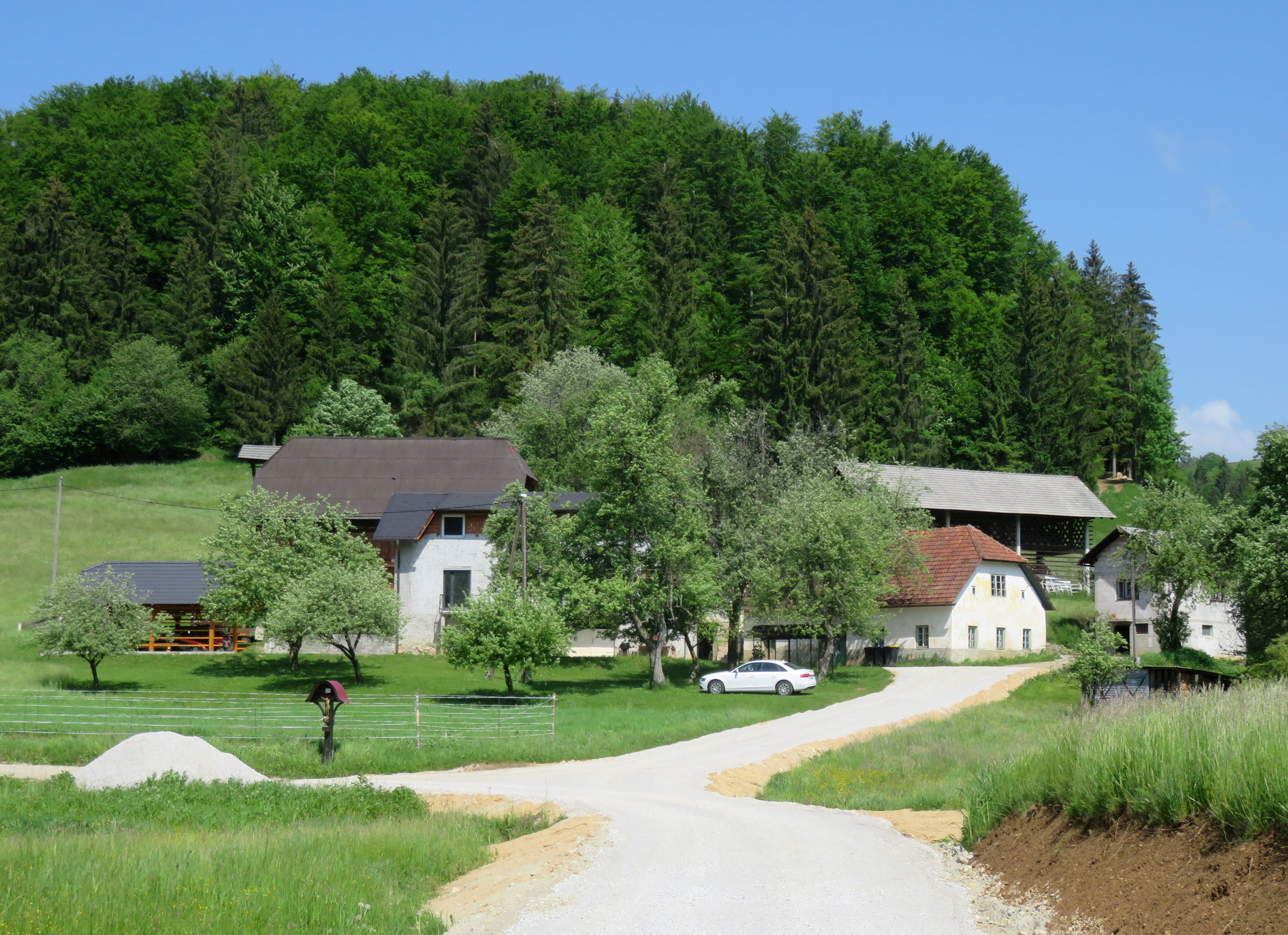

- Location in Slovenia
- Coordinates: 46°3′53.53″N 14°58′57.63″E
- Country: Slovenia
- Traditional region: Lower Carniola
- Statistical region: Central Sava
- Municipality: Litija

Area
  - Total: 4.12 km^{2} (1.59 sq mi)
- Elevation: 773.1 m (2,536 ft)

Population (2002)
  - Total: 60
- Postal code: 1272

Stranski Vrh (pronounced [ˈstɾaːnski ˈʋəːɾx]) is a settlement in the Municipality of Litija in central Slovenia. The area is part of the traditional region of Lower Carniola and is now included with the rest of the municipality in the Central Sava Statistical Region.

== Church ==
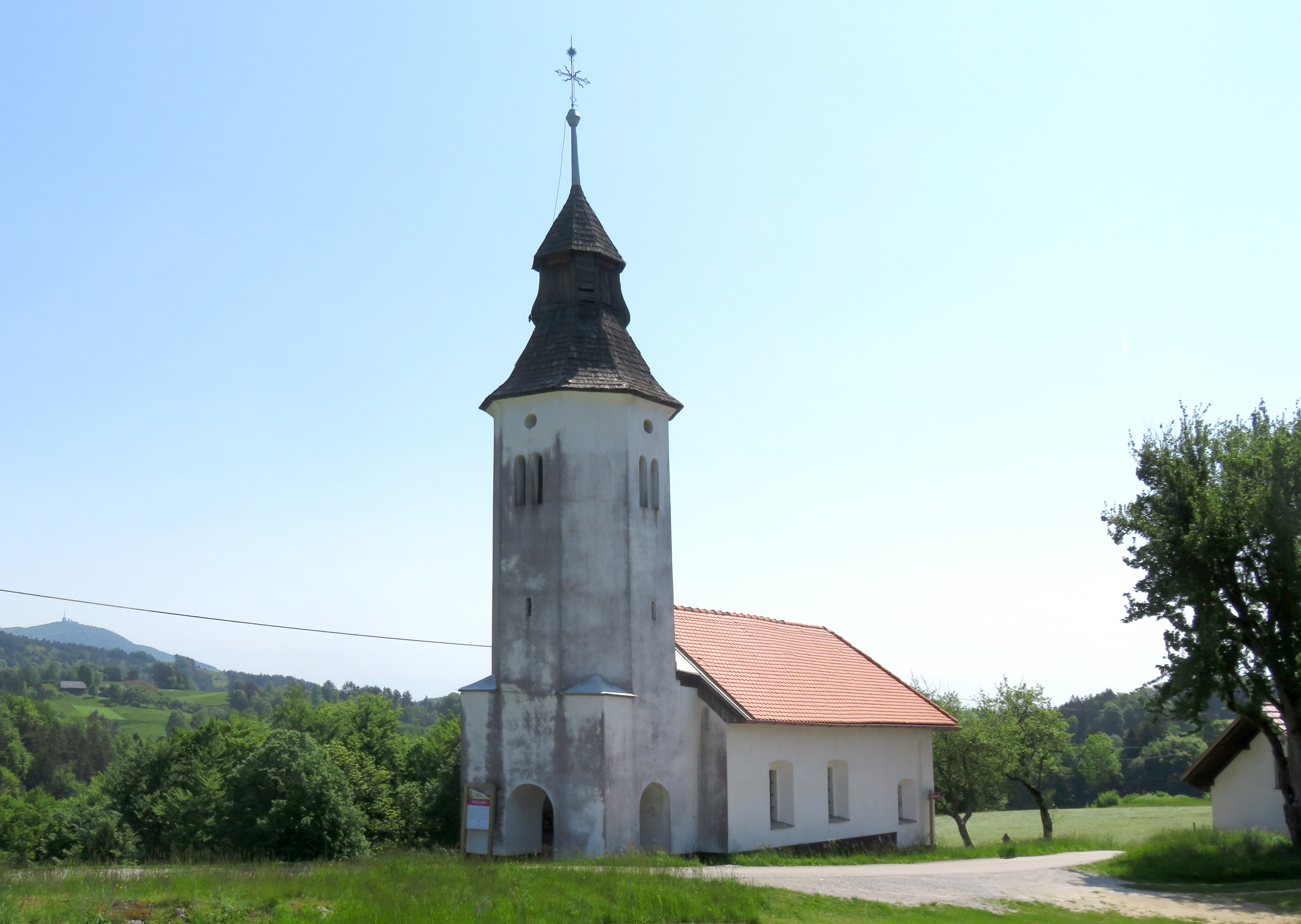
Saint Lawrence's Church

The local church is dedicated to Saint Lawrence and belongs to the Parish of Šentjurij–Podkum. It was built in the 18th century.
