= Tepe, Litija =

Tepe
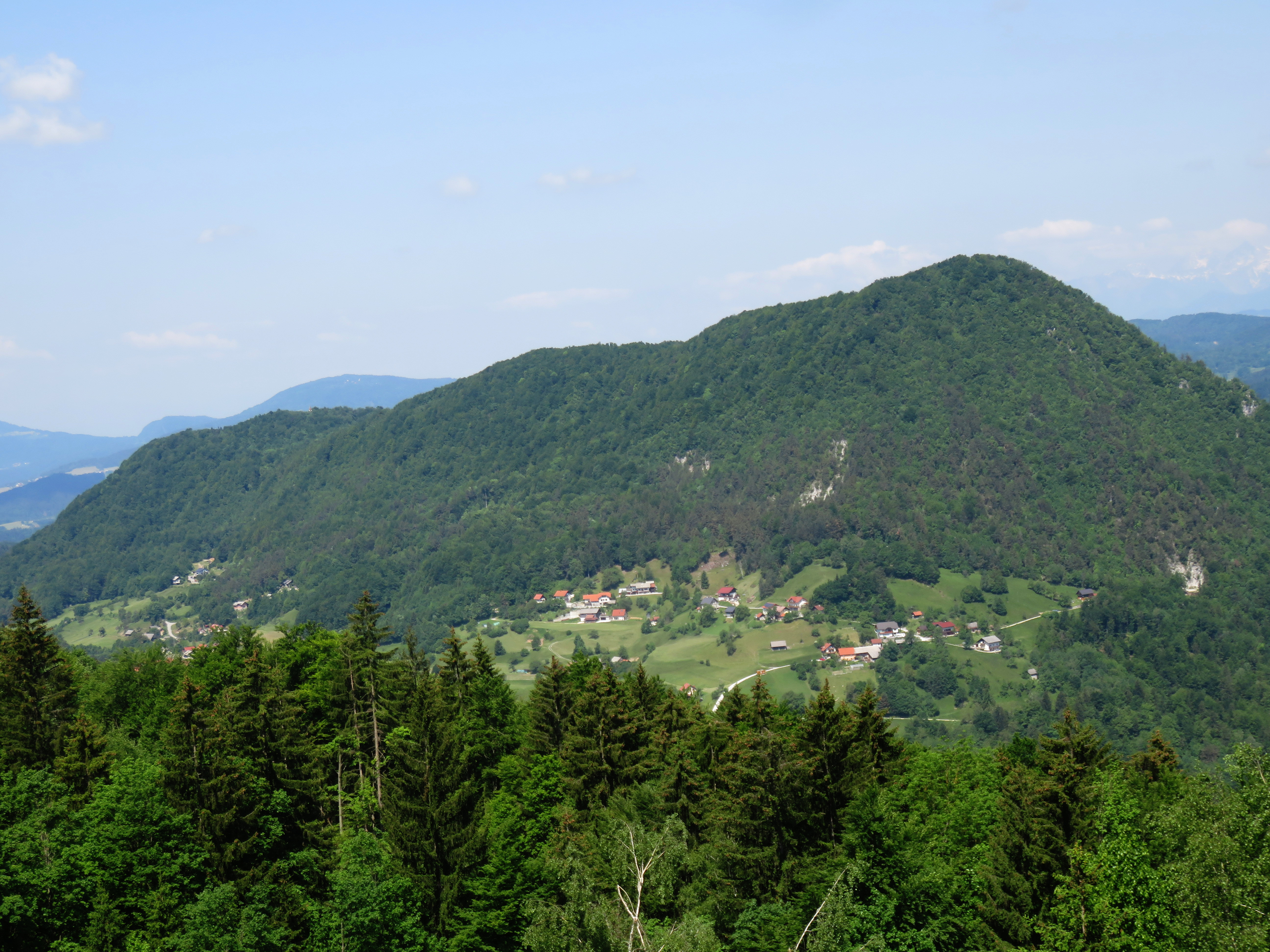

- Location in Slovenia
- Coordinates: 46°4′40.45″N 14°56′30.54″E
- Country: Slovenia
- Traditional region: Lower Carniola
- Statistical region: Central Sava
- Municipality: Litija

Area
  - Total: 5.3 km^{2} (2.0 sq mi)
- Elevation: 480.4 m (1,576 ft)
- Postal code: 1272

Tepe (pronounced [ˈteːpɛ]) is a settlement in the Municipality of Litija in central Slovenia. The area is part of the traditional region of Lower Carniola and is now included with the rest of the municipality in the Central Sava Statistical Region. It includes the hamlets of Zgornje Tepe (German: Obertepe), Srednje Tepe, Spodnje Tepe (German: Untertepe), Žamboh, Kleviše (German: Klewisch), Graben (in older sources also V Grabnu, German: Im Graben), and Pasjek. The hamlet of Nova Gora (German: Neuberg) is also mentioned in some sources.

The local church is dedicated to Saint Lawrence and belongs to the Parish of Polšnik. It was built in the 16th century.
