= Gotovlje =

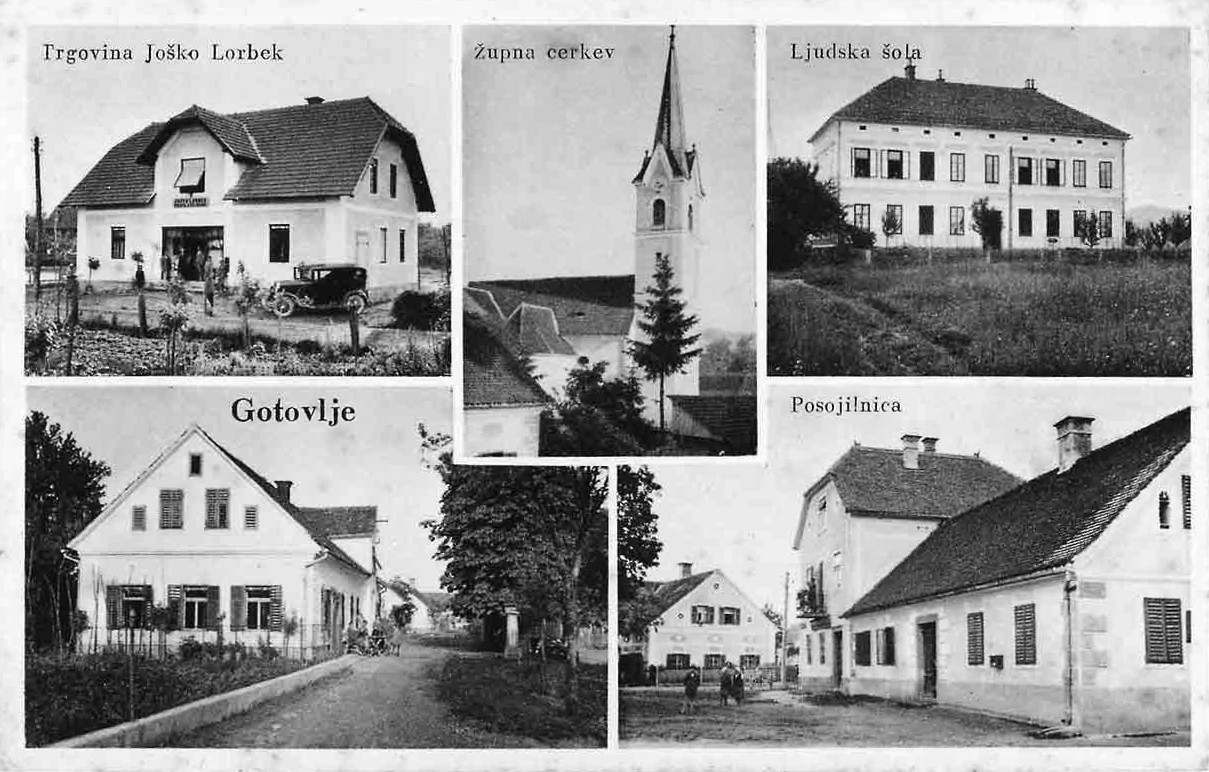
- Postcard of Gotovlje

- Location in Slovenia
- Coordinates: 46°15′42.2″N 15°9′5.46″E
- Country: Slovenia
- Traditional region: Styria
- Statistical region: Savinja
- Municipality: Žalec

Area
  - Total: 8.22 km^{2} (3.17 sq mi)
- Elevation: 263.3 m (864 ft)

Population (2002)
  - Total: 1,134

Gotovlje (pronounced [ɡɔˈtoːu̯ljɛ]; German: Gutendorf) is a settlement in the Municipality of Žalec in east-central Slovenia. The A1 motorway crosses the territory of the settlement north of the village core. The area is part of the traditional region of Styria. The municipality is now included in the Savinja Statistical Region.

The parish church in the settlement is dedicated to Saint George (Slovene: sveti Jurij) and belongs to the Roman Catholic Diocese of Celje. It is a Gothic building that was restyled in the Baroque in the mid-18th century. The belfry dates to 1907. A second church belonging to the same parish stands in the hills north of the settlement. It is dedicated to Saint Gertrude (Slovene: sveta Jedrt) and dates to the first half of the 16th century.
