= Podkum =

Podkum Sveti Jurij pod Kumom (until 1952)
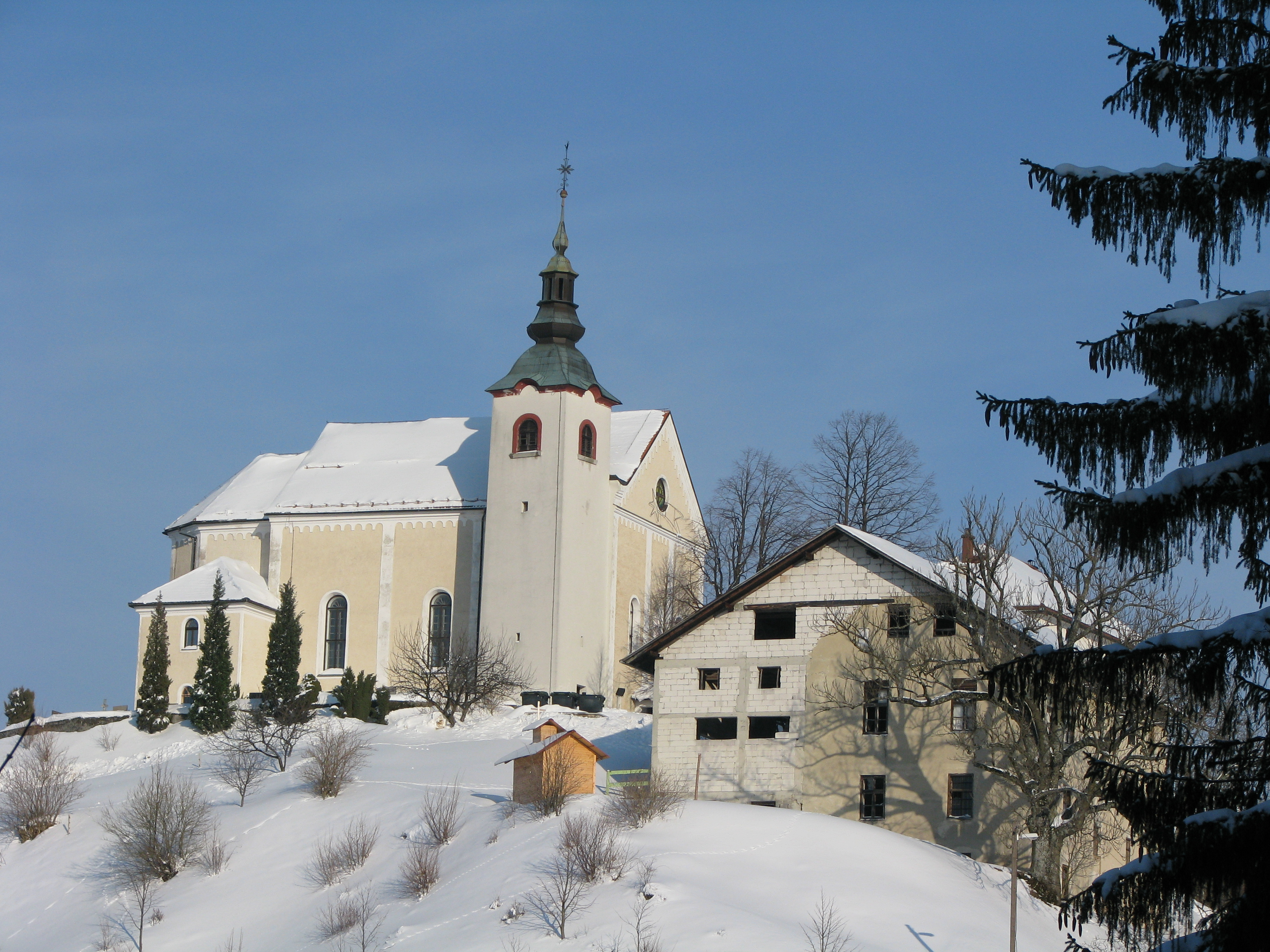

- Location in Slovenia
- Coordinates: 46°4′5.49″N 15°2′12.62″E
- Country: Slovenia
- Traditional region: Lower Carniola
- Statistical region: Central Sava
- Municipality: Zagorje ob Savi

Area
  - Total: 6.54 km^{2} (2.53 sq mi)
- Elevation: 700.8 m (2,299 ft)

Population (2002)
  - Total: 226
- Postal code: 1414

Podkum (pronounced [pɔˈtkuːm] or [ˈpoːtkum]; German: Sankt Georgen) is a settlement in the Municipality of Zagorje ob Savi in central Slovenia. The area is part of the traditional region of Lower Carniola. It is now included with the rest of the municipality in the Central Sava Statistical Region.

== Name ==
The name of the settlement was changed from Sveti Jurij pod Kumom (literally, 'Saint George below Mount Kum') to Podkum (literally, 'below Mount Kum') in 1952. The name was changed on the basis of the 1948 Law on Names of Settlements and Designations of Squares, Streets, and Buildings as part of efforts by Slovenia's postwar communist government to remove religious elements from toponyms. In the past the German name was Sankt Georgen.

== Church ==
The local parish church is dedicated to Saint George (Slovene: sveti Jurij) and belongs to the Roman Catholic Archdiocese of Ljubljana. Of the original 17th-century building only the belfry remains. The rest of the church was rebuilt in a Neo-Romanesque style in 1895.
