= Etiolles porcelain =

Etiolles porcelain was a type of French hard-paste porcelain, that was manufactured in the city of Etiolles, near Corbeil since 1766. The factory was established by Dominique Monnier and Jean-Baptiste Pellevé. Only rare specimens remain.
