= Karl Joseph Kuwasseg =

Austrian painter (1802–1877)

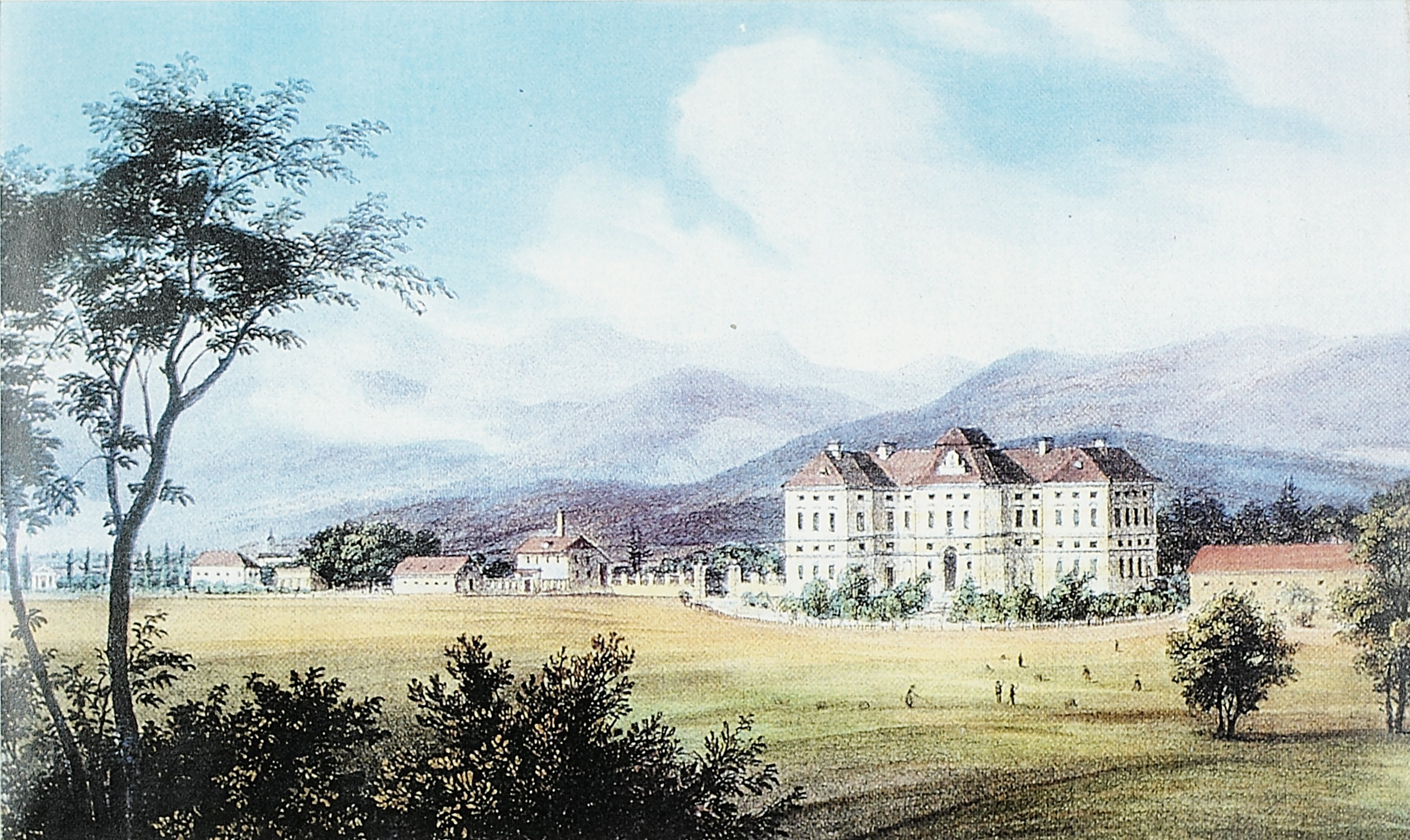
Novo Celje Mansion

Karl Joseph Kuwasseg (1802–1877) was an Austrian painter known mostly for his landscapes. He moved to Paris in 1830 and took the French nationality in 1870.

Karl Joseph Kuwasseg was born in Trieste. He moved to Vienna where he worked in watercolors. He accompanied the Count of Schomburg on his travels through Europe and America. There he produced several landscapes.

His brothers Joseph (born 1799) and Anton also became painters and lithographers, as did his son Charles Euphrasie Kuwasseg.

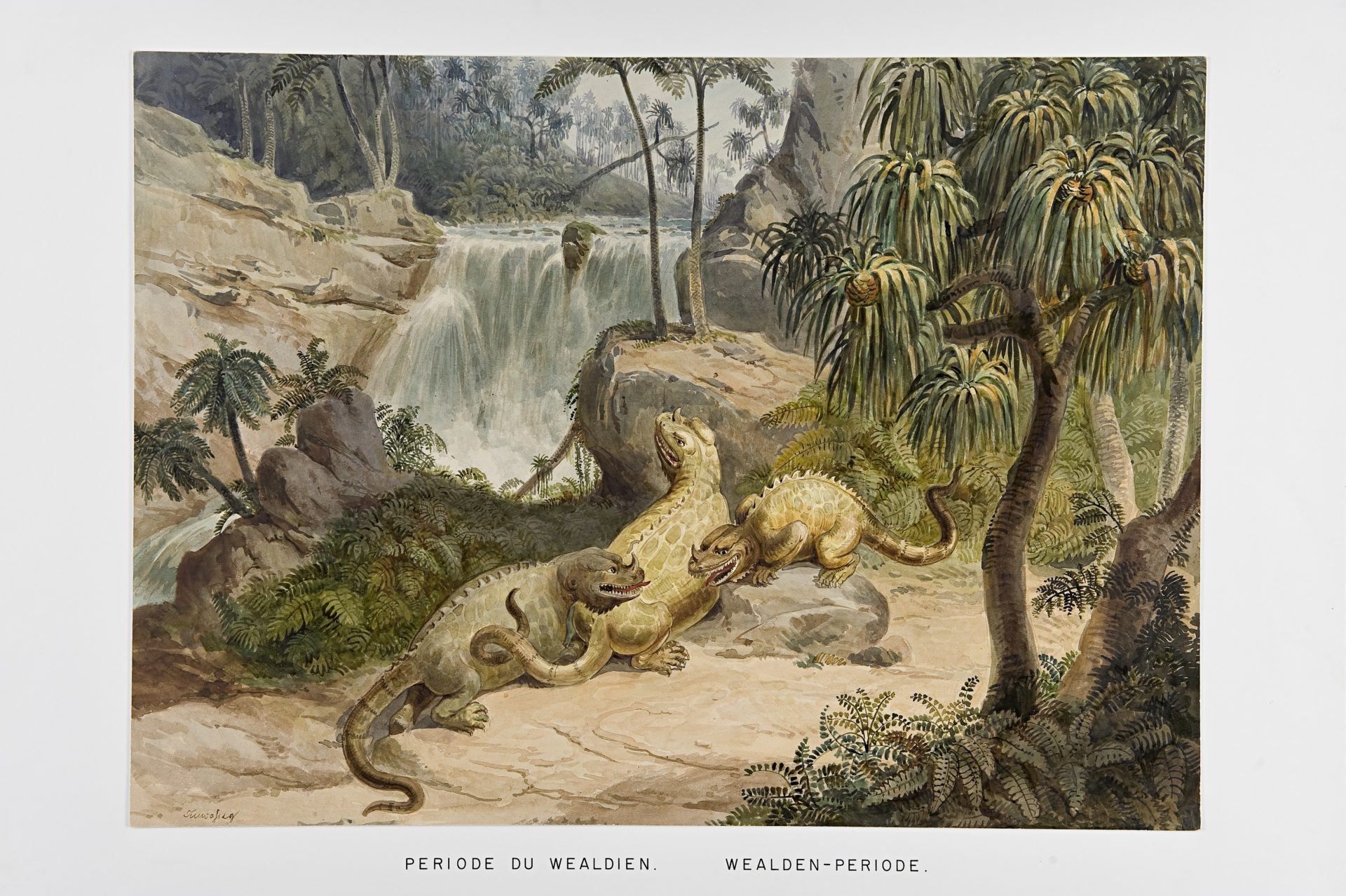
Iguanodons in Franz Unger’s The Primeval World in Various Developmental Periods
