= Novo Celje =

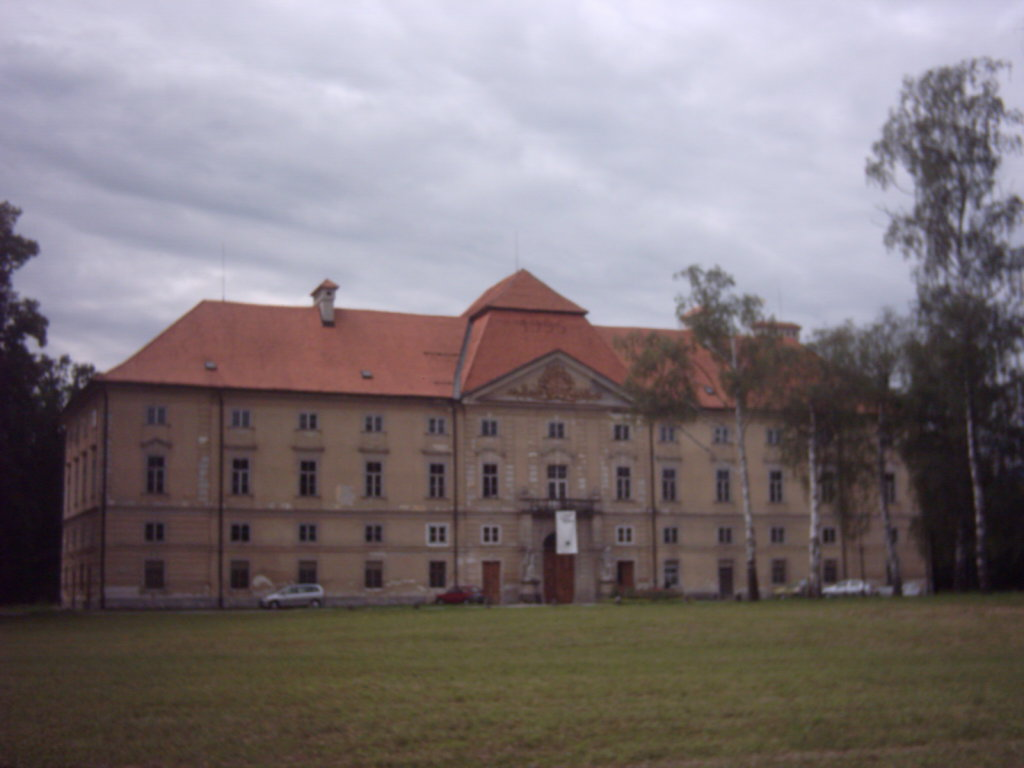
- Novo Celje Mansion

- Location in Slovenia
- Coordinates: 46°14′48.3″N 15°10′34.95″E
- Country: Slovenia
- Traditional region: Styria
- Statistical region: Savinja
- Municipality: Žalec

Area
  - Total: 0.17 km^{2} (0.066 sq mi)
- Elevation: 252.2 m (827 ft)

Population (2002)
  - Total: 13

Novo Celje (pronounced [ˈnɔ̀ːʋɔ ˈtsɛ̀ːljɛ, ˈnɔ́ː-]) is a small settlement in the Municipality of Žalec in east-central Slovenia. Its territory is basically the estate of Novo Celje Mansion, a late 18th-century mansion just southeast of Žalec. The area is part of the traditional region of Styria. The municipality is now included in the Savinja Statistical Region.

== History ==
Novo Celje became a separate settlement in 1999, when its territory was administratively separated from Dobriša Vas.
