= Bois de Boulogne massacre =

1944 execution of members of the French resistance by German troops

- Part of The liberation of Paris
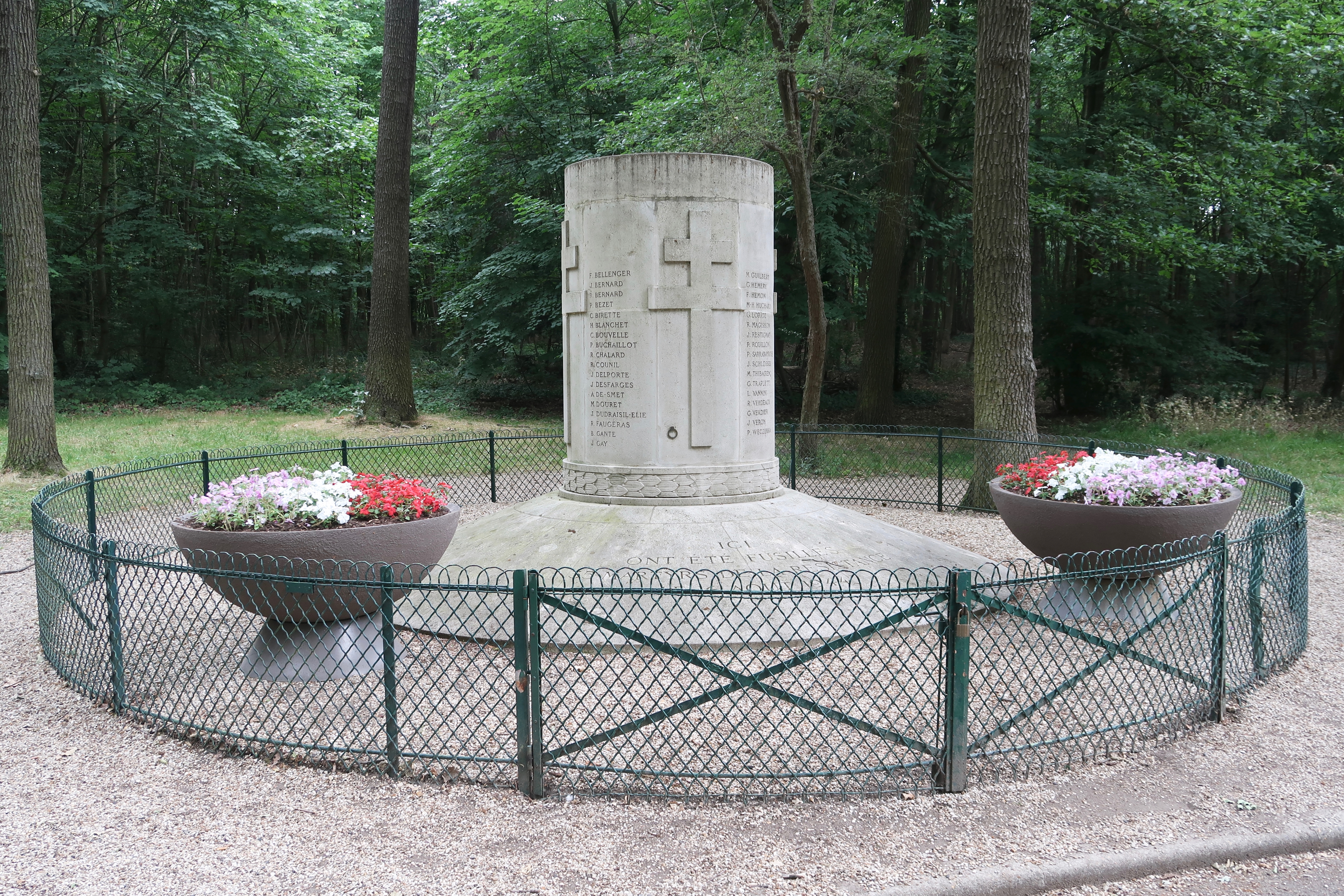
- Memorial commemorating the incident
- Location: 48.8617°N 2.2443°E; Bois de Boulogne, Paris, France
- Date: 16 August 1944
- Attack type: Mass shooting, war crime
- Deaths: 35 fighters
- Victim: French Resistance
- Perpetrator: German Army

The Bois de Boulogne massacre was an incident involving the killing of 35 young French Resistance fighters in the Bois de Boulogne on 16 August 1944 during the Second World War.

== The incident ==
Following the Normandy landings in June 1944, as the allied armies swept across northern Europe there was much anticipation that the French Resistance would rise up and overthrow the German occupiers. However, there was a serious shortage of arms available to the French Resistance. A group known as the Jeunes Chrétiens Combattants (Young Christian Fighters), led by Father Raymond Borme, promised an imminent delivery of a large shipment of weapons. However, Borme's group had been infiltrated by a group of French collaborators operating under the direction of the local head of the Gestapo, Friedrich Berger, based at No. 11 Rue des Saussaies.

A group of 35 young French Resistance fighters, drawn from Jeunesse Ouvrière Catholique (JOC), Organisation Civile et Militaire (OCM) and Francs-Tireurs et Partisans (FTP), were lured to Paris to collect the weapons on 16 August 1944. After being picked up by a collaborator, "Captain Jack" alias Guy Glèbe de Marcheret d'Eu, at Porte Maillot, they were taken to the Gestapo Headquarters for interrogation.

The Governor of Paris, General Dietrich von Choltitz, ordered their execution and they were then transported to the Great Cascade in the Bois de Boulogne, where they were shot by German troops and their bodies were found by gardeners the following morning. This was nine days before the official liberation of the city by the French 2nd Armoured Division, commanded by General Philippe Leclerc, on 25 August 1944.

The group included 14 people from Chelles, Seine-et-Marne, where a plaque was installed at the Hôtel de Ville to commemorate their lives. Another seven came from Draveil, Essonne, where the Château de Villiers was the scene of a court martial which handed down heavy sentences on those collaboraters thought to have been responsible for the ambush. One of the people executed in this highly controversial purge was the mayor, Léon Bru.

A circular memorial, inscribed with the names of the individuals who were shot together with the Cross of Lorraine, was later unveiled at the place where the bodies were found.
