= Château de Villiers =

Town hall in Draveil, France

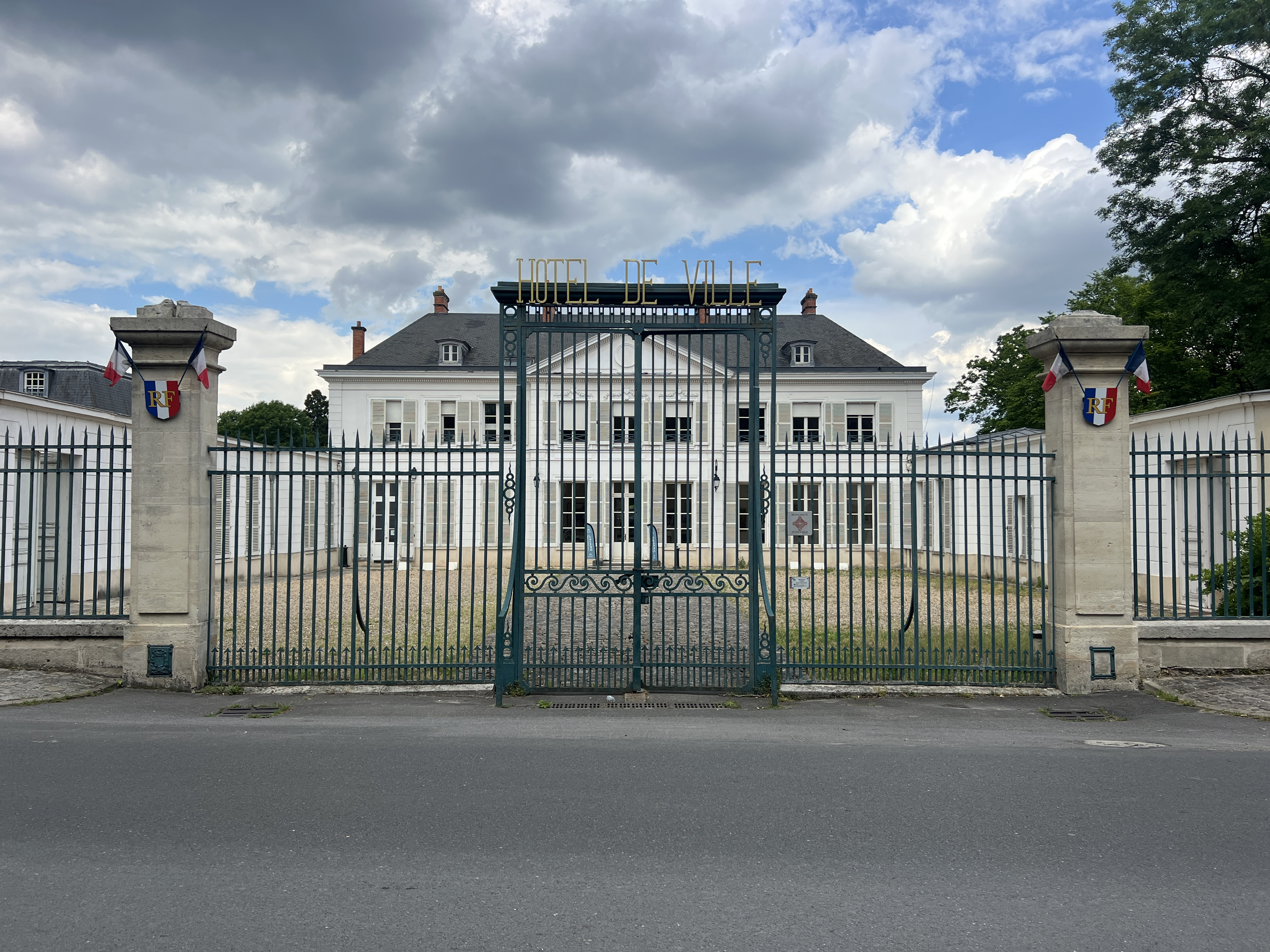
- The main frontage of the Château de Villiers in May 2024

General information
- Type: City hall
- Architectural style: Neoclassical style
- Location: Draveil, France
- Coordinates: 48.6824°N 2.4053°E
- Completed: 1781

Monument historique
- Official name: Château de Villiers
- Type: Inscrit
- Designated: 1950
- Reference no.: PA00087888

The Château de Villiers (French pronunciation: [otɛl də vil] is a municipal building in Draveil, Essonne, in the southern suburbs of Paris, standing on Avenue de Villiers. It was designated a monument historique by the French government in 1950.

== History ==
=== The first town hall ===
Following the French Revolution, the town council established its first municipal office in a farm building on land which formed part of the estate of the Château de Draveil. The château had been commissioned by the royal tax collector, Marin de la Haye. It was designed in the French Renaissance style, built in ashlar stone and was completed in around 1720. The château was the French home of William Courtenay, 10th Earl of Devon when it burnt down in July 1839.

=== The second town hall ===
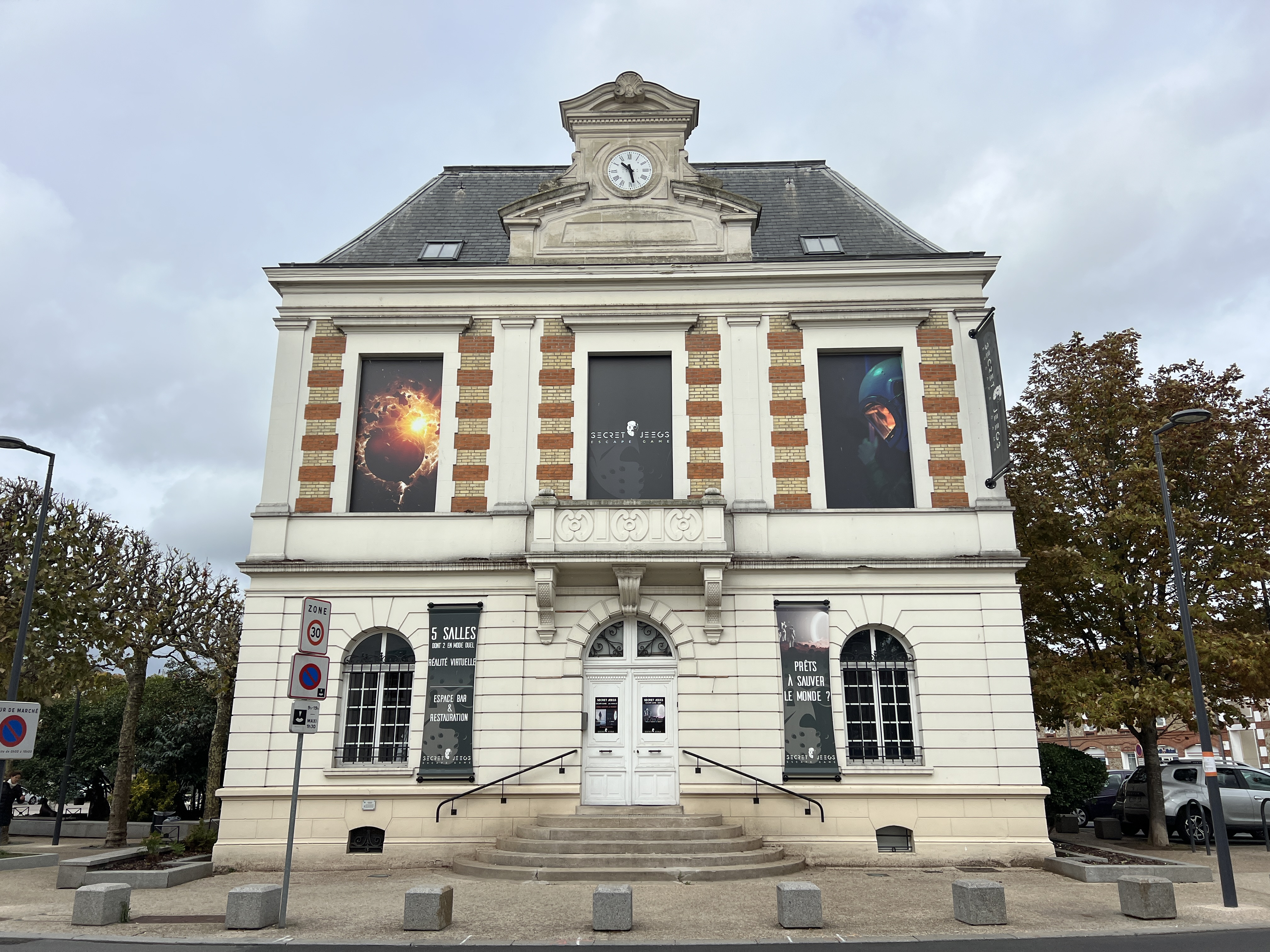
The second town hall

In the late 19th century, after finding the old farm building inadequate, the council decided to demolish it and to erect a new building, the second town hall, on the same site. The new building was designed by Marc Pasquet in the neoclassical style, built in red brick with ashlar stone finishings by Messrs Soumastre of Villeneuve-Saint-Georges and was officially opened by the mayor, Jules Joseph Jégu, on 20 July 1900.

The design involved a symmetrical main frontage of three bays facing onto Place de la République. The central bay featured a short flight of steps leading up to a round headed doorway with voussoirs and a keystone. On the first floor, there was a French door with a stone balcony and a cornice. The outer bays were fenestrated by round headed windows on the ground floor and by casement windows with cornices on the first floor. At roof level there was an entablature, a cornice and, above the central bay, a segmental pediment containing a clock. In 1919, additional land was acquired behind the building to create a public square (now Place de la Division Leclerc). After the building was no longer required for municipal use, it served as a local tourist information office and then as a community centre, before being converted into a venue for playing immersive games, known as "Secret Jeegs", in 2022.

=== The third town hall: Maison Chapuis ===
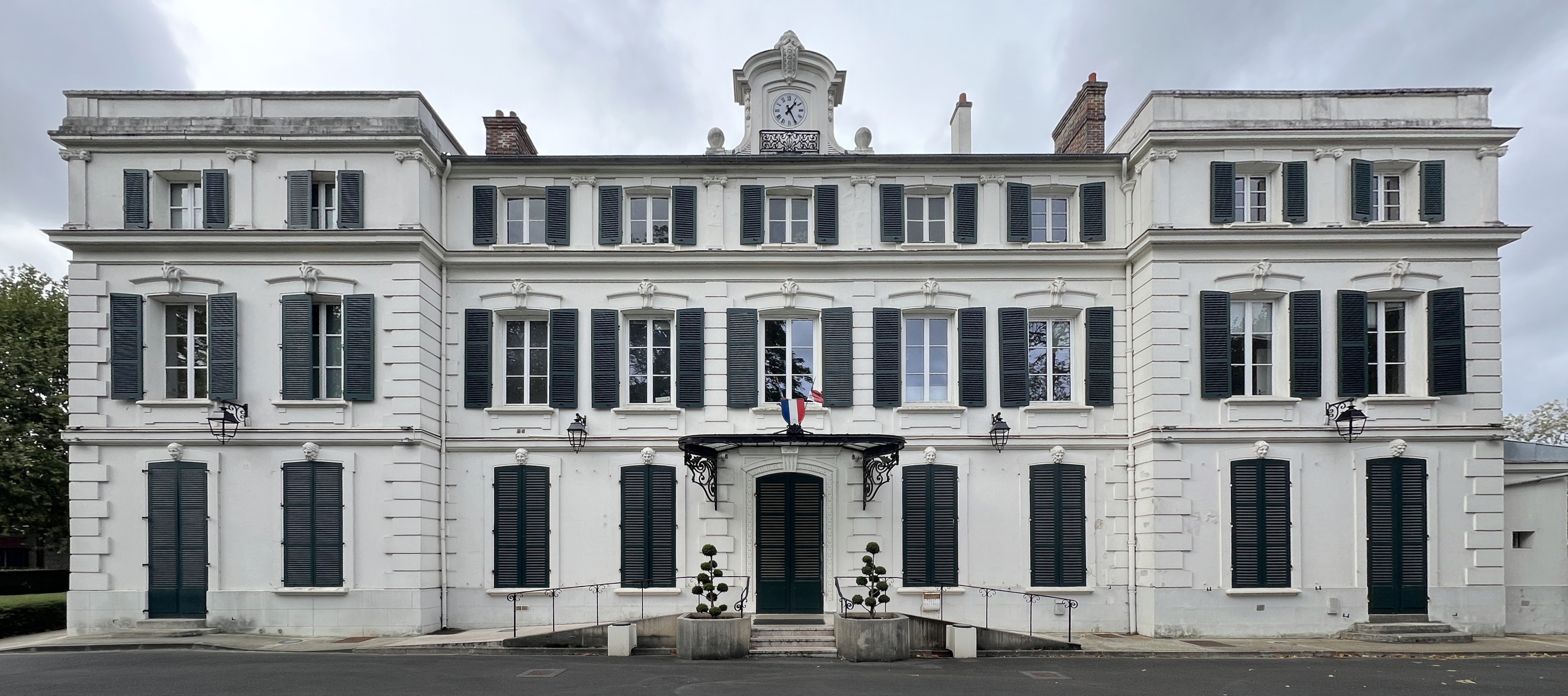
The third town hall

In the early 1960s, the council decided to acquire a more substantial municipal building. The building they selected as the third town hall was the Maison Chapuis on the west side of Boulevard Henri Barbusse. The building was commissioned by Jean Monglas who was secretary to Cardinal André-Hercule de Fleury. The building was designed in the neoclassical style, built of brick with a cement render finish and was completed in around 1735. The original design involved a main block of five bays facing onto the street. The central bay featured a segmental headed doorway. The building was fenestrated by segmental headed windows on the first two floors and by smaller, square headed windows on the second floor. Wings, which were slightly projected forward, were subsequently added and a clock was installed above the central bay.

From 1802 to 1807, the house was owned by Alexandrine Marie Julie de Lévis-Mirepoix, whose husband, Charles-Philibert-Marie-Gaston de Lévis-Mirepoix, Count de Mirepoix, had been executed during the French Revolution. It was then the home of Antoine de Raigecourt-Gournay, Marquis de Raigecourt-Gournay, until his death in 1833, and was subsequently owned by a succession of private owners before being bought by a wine merchant, Louis Chapuis, in 1891. It was acquired by the council in 1943 but was only fully converted for municipal use in 1963.

=== The fourth town hall: Château de Villiers ===
In the early 21st century, the council decided to use the Maison Chapuis as an administrative centre, and to use the Château de Villiers on Avenue de Villiers for council meetings and wedding ceremonies, becoming as its fourth town hall. The château was commissioned by a soldier and diplomat, Marc Marie, Marquis de Bombelles. It was designed in the neoclassical style, built in ashlar stone and was completed in around 1782. The design involved a symmetrical main frontage of nine bays facing onto a courtyard. The central section of three bays, which was slightly projected forward, featured a doorway flanked by casement windows on the ground floor, three casement windows surmounted by garlands on the first floor, and a modillioned pediment above. The other bays were fenestrated in a similar style.

The château was acquired by Amans Pécoul, whose father made his money from sugar plantations in Martinique, in 1838, and it subsequently passed down his family, serving as a military hospital in the Franco-Prussian War of 1870.

After inheriting the château as a child, François Hutteau d'Origny joined the French Resistance during the Second World War and allowed the château to be used as a staging post for British and Canadian airmen escaping down the Pat O'Leary Line into Spain and from there to Gibraltar. On 16 August 1944, a group of resistance fighters were lured from the château to retrieve weapons from a location in central Paris: they were taken to the Bois de Boulogne where they were shot in a massacre by German troops supported by French collaborators. After the town was a liberated by American troops on 26 August 1944, the château was the scene of a court martial which handed down heavy sentences on those people thought to have been responsible for the ambush. One of the people executed in this highly controversial purge was the mayor, Léon Bru.

The château was bought by Caisse des dépôts et consignations in 1954 and, after being acquired by the council in 1987, it became a media library in 1991. A major programme of refurbishment works was initiated in 2005, before it re-opened as the new town hall in 2008.
