= Fanny Hausmann =

Slovenian writer and poet of German origin

- Franziska Maria Elisabeth Haussmann
- Born: 16 April 1818; Bruck an der Mur, Duchy of Styria, Austrian Empire
- Died: 4 April 1853 (aged 34); Dobriša Vas, Duchy of Styria, Austrian Empire
- Occupations: Poet, writer
- Known for: Alleged first Slovenian woman poet

Franziska Maria Elisabeth Haussmann (16 April 1818 – 4 April 1853) was a Slovenian writer and poet of German origin.

Hausmann was born in Bruck an der Mur, the daughter of Joseph Ludwig Haussmann and Elise Haussmann (née Pretterhofer).

Hausmann is generally hailed as the first female poet to write in Slovene, although that claim has been contested. Most of her work consisted of patriotic poems and love poems.

Hausmann's poems preceded the existence of a national literary magazine, and they were therefore published in weekly newspapers. Her first published poem, "Vojaka izhod" (A Soldier's Exit), appeared in Celske novine (Celje News) in 1848, and her other poetry appeared both in that newspaper and in Slovenija. Her work was influential with Slovenian populists and also paved the way for more women writers to gain entry into the Slovenian literary scene and public sphere.

Hausmann died at age 34 in Dobriša Vas.
