= Charles Kuwasseg =

French painter

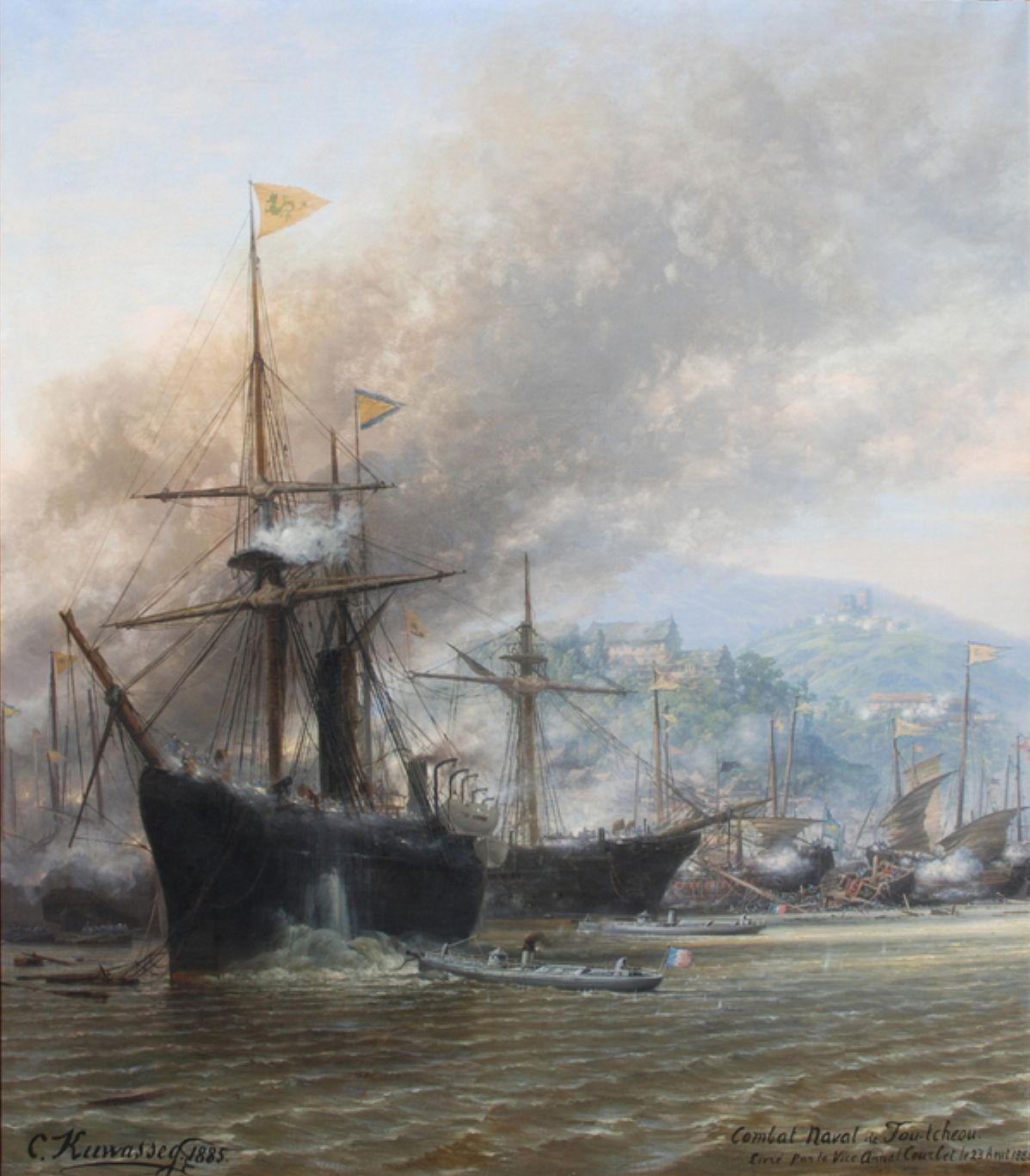
Chinese ships Yangwu and Fuxing being attacked by French torpedo boats No. 46 and No. 45 at the Battle of Fuzhou. Combat Naval De Fou-Tcheou by Charles Kuwasseg, 1885.

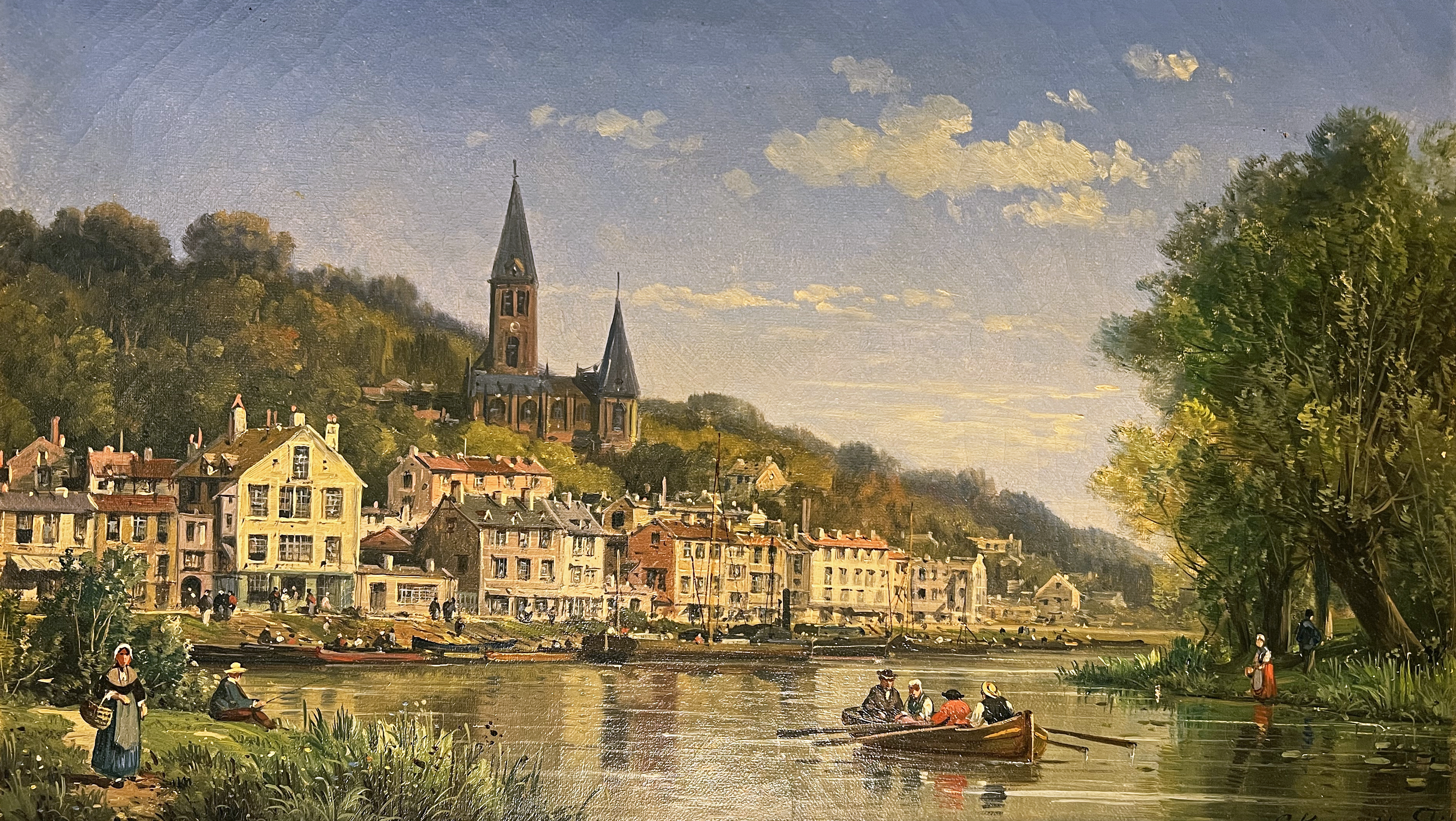
Swiss Riverside Village circa 1870-1880

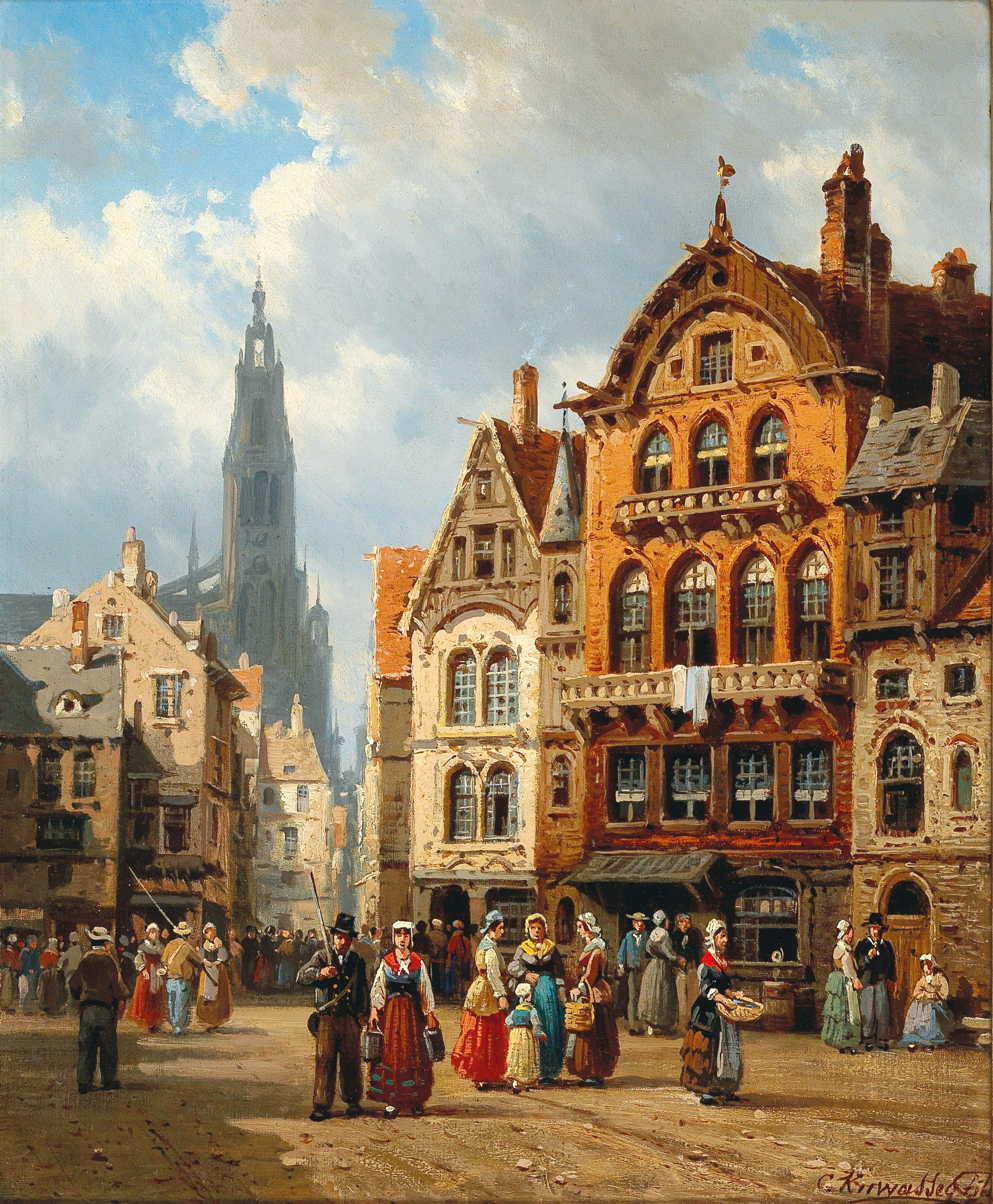
Antwerp Cityscape

Charles Euphrasie Kuwasseg (1838, Draveil, Essonne – 1904) was a French painter of the 19th century. He essentially specialized in landscape paintings - particularly the coastal landscapes of Brittany and Normandy. His father, Karl Joseph Kuwasseg, was an Austrian born in Trieste on March 16, 1802, and also a renowned painter. His father left for Paris, and took French nationality. He died in Paris in January 1877.

The younger Kuwasseg had exhibitions at the Salon of French Artists and the Paris Salon. He won the bronze medal in 1892 at the Salon of French Artists. Charles received his first training from his father and subsequently received his formal training studying under Jean Baptiste Henri Durand-Brager and Eugene Isabey. Before beginning his formal training he had been a sailor. He was influenced by the Barbizon School.

His work is represented in museums in Montreal, Rouen, Pontoise, Digne and La Rochelle.

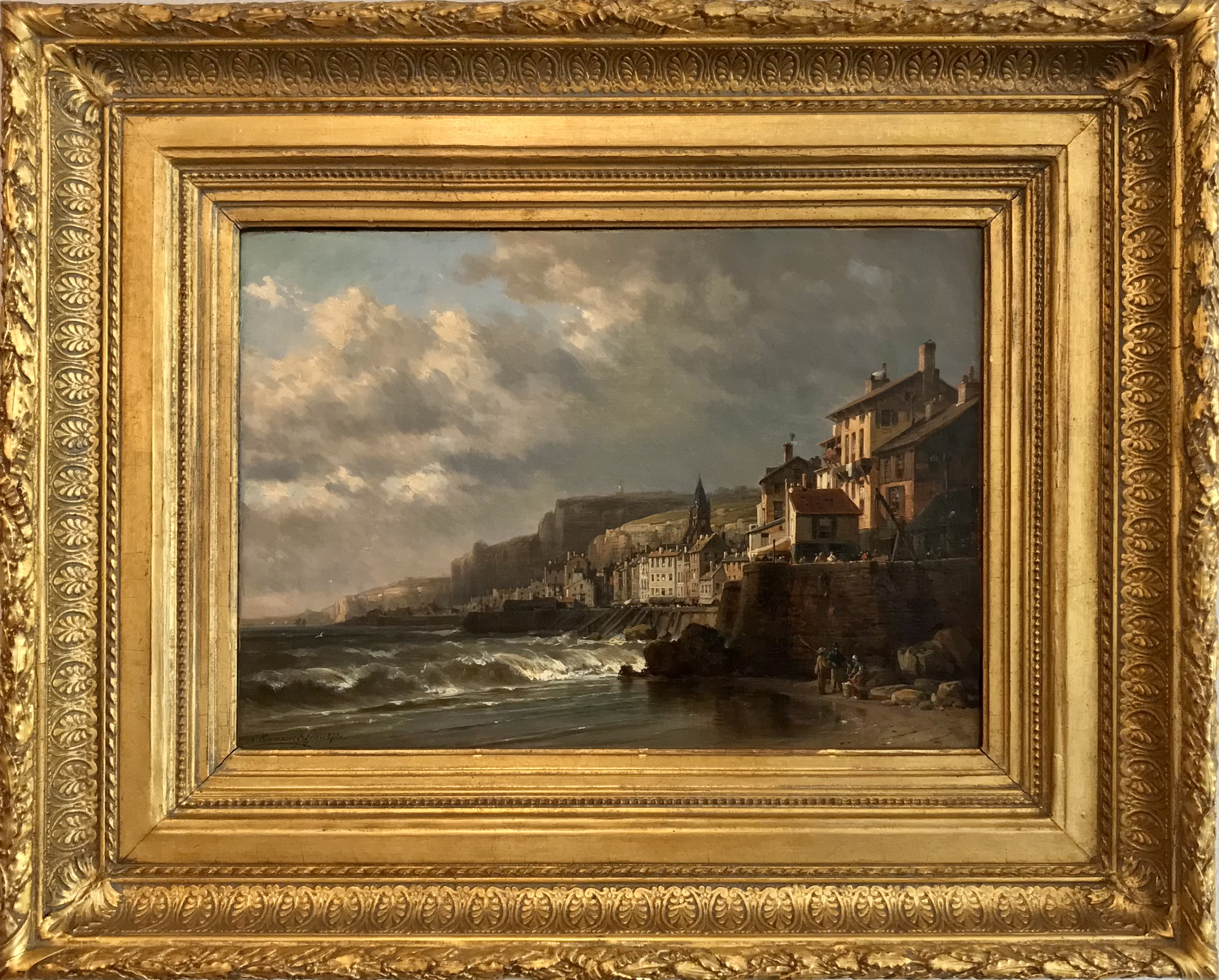
Charles Kuwasseg Seaside Town - 1875, From the Hamilton private collection
