= Novo Celje Mansion =

Coordinates: 46°14′48″N 15°10′34″E

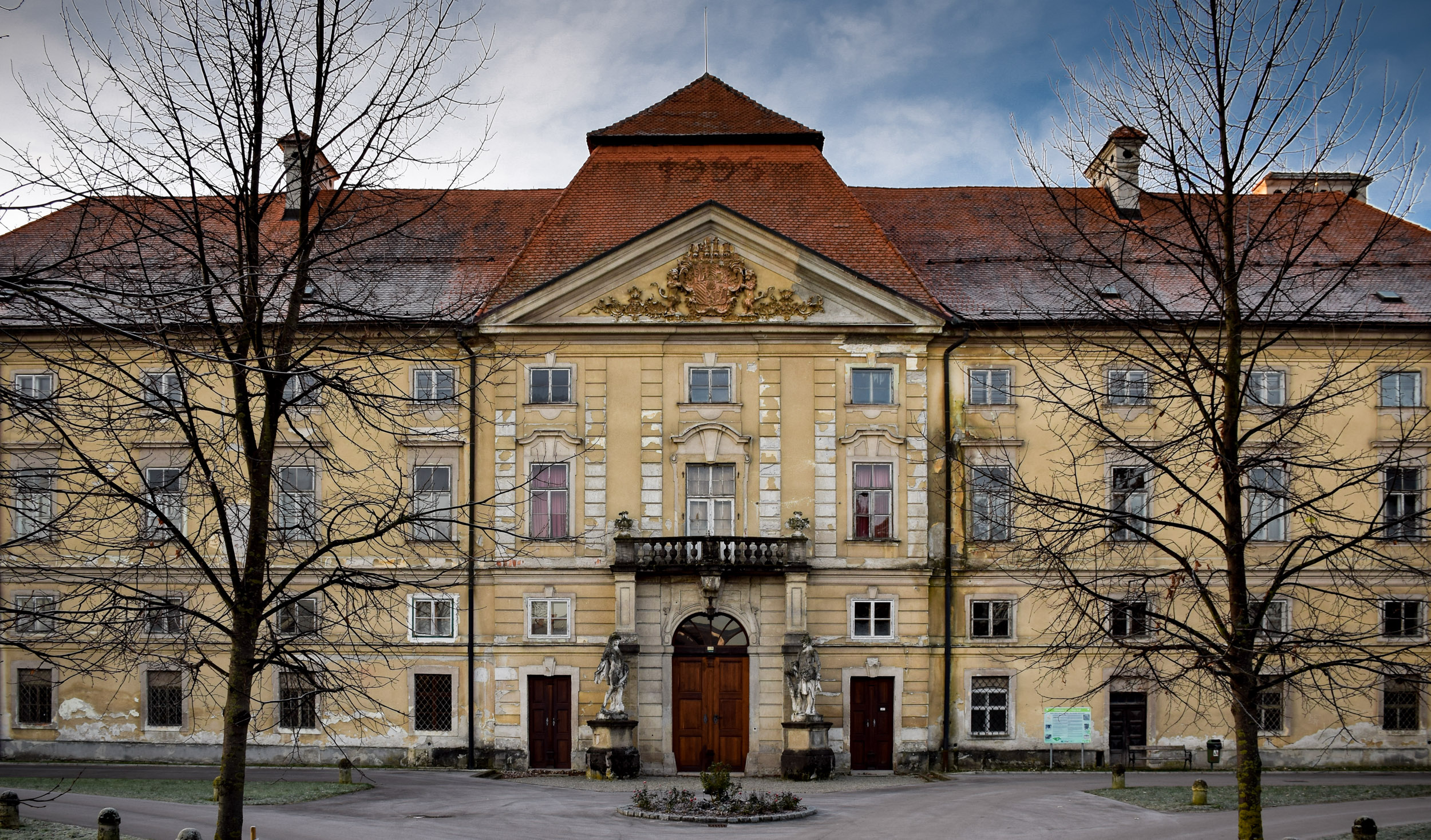
North facade with the main portal

Novo Celje (pronounced [ˈnɔ̀ːʋɔ ˈtsɛ̀ːljɛ, ˈnɔ́ː-]; lit. ''New Celje'') is a late Baroque mansion in the settlement of Novo Celje in the Municipality of Žalec west of Celje in the Styria region of Slovenia.

The mansion was built between 1752 and 1755 by a local nobleman, Anton Gaisruck, who had bought a decaying late medieval hunting mansion called Brutnberg (known locally as Plumberk) that stood on the same location. He used some elements from the old Celje Castle for its construction, causing further deterioration of this important historical site. In the mid-19th century, the mansion was bought by the Styrian nobleman Joseph Ludwig Hausmann (Slovenized: Jožef Ludvik Hausmann), the father of Fanny Hausmann (1818–1853), who is generally regarded as the first female poet to write in Slovene. He was also notable for introducing the cultivation of hops to Lower Styria, which launched a flourishing brewing industry in the Savinja Valley between Celje, Žalec, and Laško.

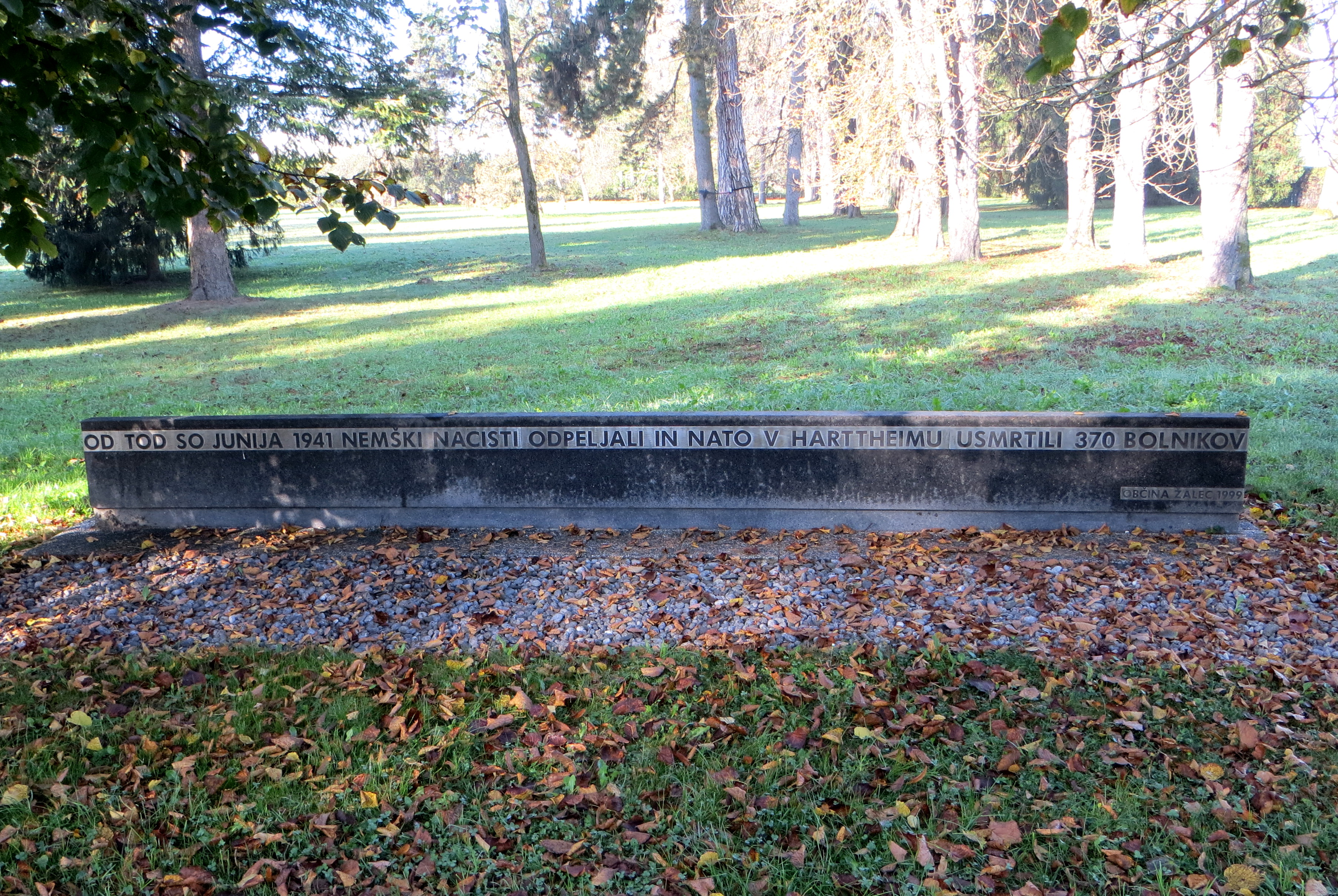
Second World War memorial at Novo Celje

In the late 1920s, the mansion was bought by the local authorities, and in the 1930s it was transformed into a psychiatric hospital run by the Slovenian regional government. Most of the costly interior decorations were removed from the manor and placed in the National Museum of Slovenia. After the armed forces of Nazi Germany annexed Lower Styria in 1941, the 390 patients of the institution were transported to the Hartheim Euthanasia Centre near Linz, where they were killed. After the Second World War, a memorial plaque was placed near the building to commemorate the incident.
