= Celje Castle =

Ancient castle in Slovenia

Coordinates: 46°13′11″N 15°16′18″E

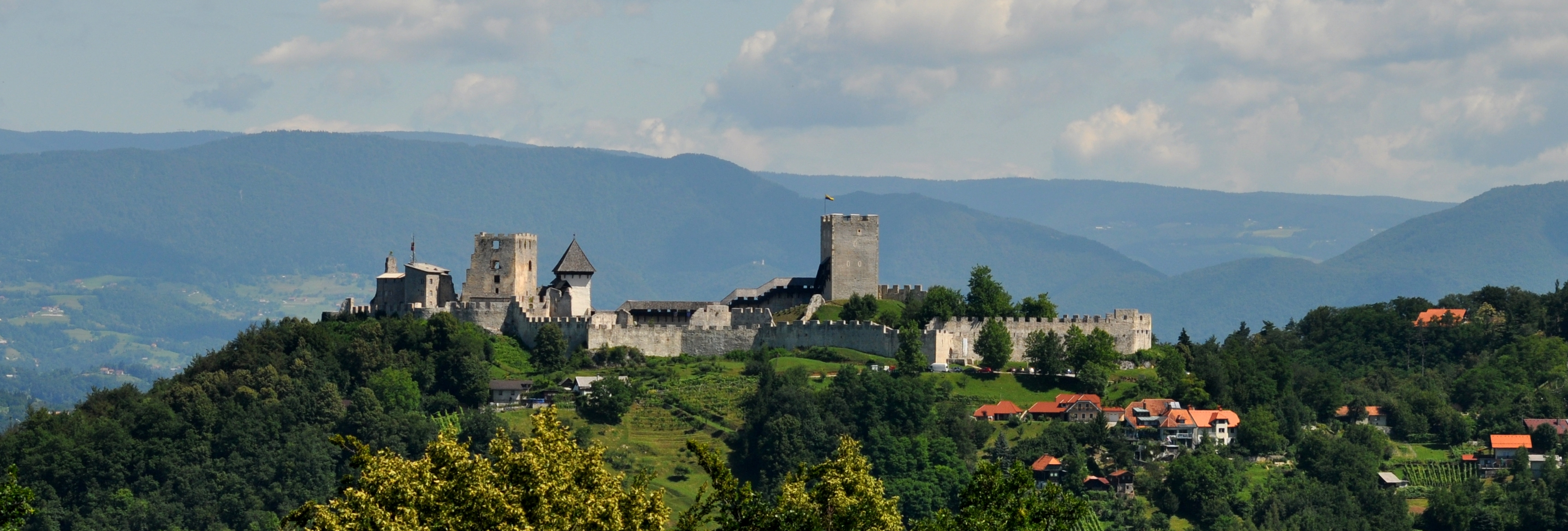
Celje Castle from Pečovnik (to the southwest)

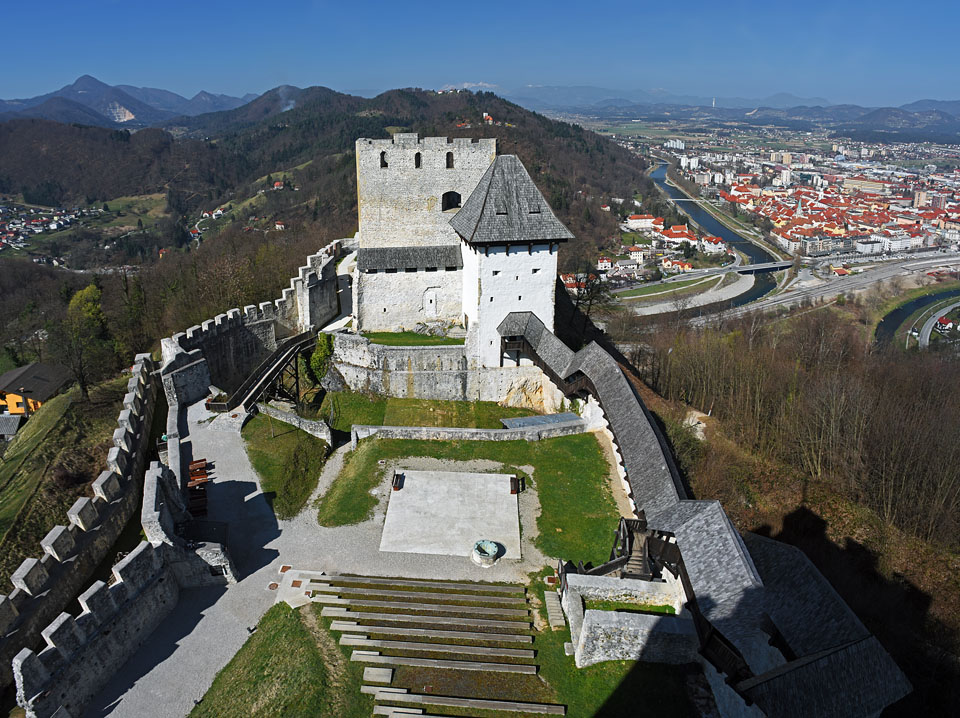
The panorama of Celje Castle from its great tower

Celje Castle (Slovene: Celjski grad), also known as Celje Upper Castle (Celjski zgornji grad) or Old Castle (Stari grad), is a castle ruin in Celje, Slovenia, formerly the seat of the Counts of Celje. It stands on three hills to the southeast of Celje, where the river Savinja meanders into the Laško valley. Today, the castle is in the process of being restored. It was once the largest fortification on Slovenian territory.

== History ==
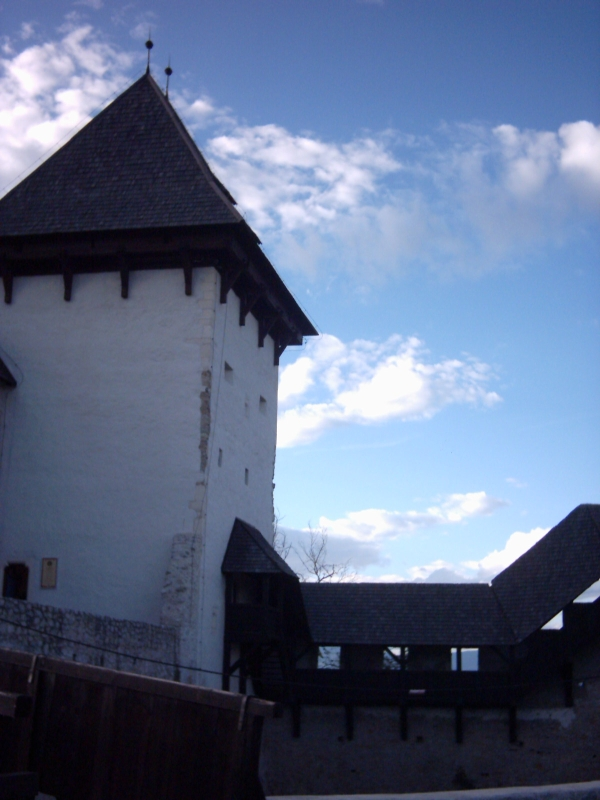
Celje Upper Castle

=== Early history ===
The earliest reference to Celje Castle dates from 1322 and calls it “purch Cylie”. Later, the castle was known by various names, including “vest Cili” (1341), “castrum Cilie” (1451), “gsloss Obercili” (1468). It is noteworthy that the name “Obercili” - Upper Celje - only appears after the Counts of Celje had died out. Its original name was “grad Celje” (Celje Castle).

The first fortified building on the site (a Romanesque palace) was built in the first half of the 13th century by the Counts of Heunburg from Carinthia on the stony outcrop on the western side of the ridge where the castle stands. It had five sides, or four plus the southern side, which was a natural defence. The first written records of the castle date back to between 1125 and 1137; it was probably built by Count Gunter. In the western section of the castle, there was a building with several floors. Remains of the walls of this palatium have survived. In the eastern section, there was an enclosed courtyard with large water reservoirs. The eastern wall, which protects the castle from its most exposed side, was around three metres thicker than the rest of the curtain wall. The wall was topped with a parapet and protected walkway. This was typical of Ministerialis castles of the time.

=== Lords of Sanneck and Counts of Celje ===
The first castle was probably burned and destroyed in the fighting between the Lords of Sanneck and the Lords of Auffenstein. The gateway was later moved from the northern side by freemen loyal to the Lords of Sanneck. They gave the castle a new curtain wall and reinforced this with a tower on the northern side, which guarded the entrance to the inner ward, sometime before 1300. The new wall reached from a natural cliff in the east to the remains of the earlier wall in the northeast. The entrance was moved to the southern side, where it still is today.

In 1333, the castle came into the possession of the Lords of Sanneck, who from 1341 onward were the Counts of Celje. They set about transforming the fortress into a comfortable living quarter and their official residence. Around 1400, they added a four-storey tower which was later called Friderikov stolp (Frederick's tower, from bergfrid, modern German Bergfried, the term for the central tower of a castle in the Middle Ages). On the eastern side of the courtyard, there was a tall, three-story residential tower, which is the best preserved section of the castle after Friderikov stolp. The main residential building (a palatium), which also had rooms for women, stood however in the western section of the castle. This part of the castle ends at the narrow outer ward and is in a state of disrepair. On the southern side of the palatium, there was a tower, known as Andrejev stolp (Andrew's tower), after the chapel on the ground floor, which was dedicated to Saint Andrew. In the Middle Ages, the castle walls were impenetrable; an attacker would have had to rely on starving the defenders into submission, but a hidden passageway led from the castle to a nearby granary. The Counts of Celje stopped living in the castle in this period, but they stationed a castellan with an armed entourage here.

During an earthquake in 1348, part of the Romanesque palace and the rock on which it stood were destroyed. The ruined section was rebuilt and relocated towards the bailey. In the 15th century, the outer ward was extended on the eastern side of the ridge as far as the rocky outcrop. Here, the wall connected with a powerful, five-sided tower. In the second half of the 16th century, the castle was once again renovated. The walls in the inner and outer wards were made taller, and the bailey was renovated. The modern sections of the walls feature Renaissance-era balistraria.

=== Holy Roman Empire ===
The first imperial caretaker, Krištof pl. Ungnad, was named in 1461. The second, Jurij pl. Apfaltrer, was named just two years later. The castle entered the care of Andrej pl. Hohenwart in 1470. When he took it over, he swore to take good care of it and to keep it in a good condition. He carried out this service until his death in 1503. He was succeeded as castle caretaker by Jakob pl. Landau, the government administrator in Upper and Lower Swabia. Landau obtained the position from Emperor Maximilian I, who was at the time still the King of the Romans, for having lent him 10,000 crowns. Landau was still castle caretaker in 1514. Two years later, Bernard Raunacher briefly held this position, but the emperor ordered him to hand authority to Gašper Herbst and to make do with the income generated by Rudolfswert (later Novo Mesto). Other caretakers followed, most of whom were at the same time vicedominus and the administrator of various taxes. The castle's importance as a fortress rapidly gave way to its economic role.

Celje Castle was not only the most important castle in Slovenia, but in the entire eastern Alps. It covered an area of almost 5500 m^{2}. From the ruins that remain and from depictions of the castle that have survived, it is possible to paint a detailed picture of how it once looked. Several new techniques were employed in the castle's architectural development, which were the model for other castles in the region under Celje's influence.

The castle began to fall into disrepair shortly after losing its strategic importance. Georg Matthäus Vischer’s depiction of the castle from 1681 shows that Friderikov stolp no longer had a roof at the end of the 17th century. During the renovation of the lower castle (the section closest to the town) in 1748, the castle’s tiled roof was removed. When Count Gaisruck bought the castle in 1755, he removed the roof truss as well. The best stones were then re-used in the construction of the Novo Celje Mansion between Petrovče and Žalec. From this time onward, it was no longer possible to live in the castle, and it slowly turned into a complete ruin. The last residents left the site in 1795.

In 1803, the farmer Andrej Gorišek bought the castle and began to use the site as a quarry.

=== 19th and 20th centuries ===
In 1846, the governor of the Styria, Count Wickenburg, bought the ruins and donated them to the Styrian estates. In 1871, interest in the ruins began to take hold and in 1882 the Celje museum society began efforts to restore the castle, which continue to this day. During the time of the Kingdom of Yugoslavia, the authorities in Maribor left control over the ruins to the local municipality, which made great contributions to the castle's preservation. During World War II, the ruins were abandoned, but reconstruction efforts continued after the war. In the corners of the Friderikov stolp, cement blocks were used to replace missing stones. A proper parking lot was also created in front of the entrance to the castle. On the northern side, the wall was knocked through to create a new side entrance to meet a new route that had been built there (Pelikanova pot). From 1972 Tatjana Bregant led archaeological excavations at the Old Castle site.

=== 21st century ===
The Celje tourist board holds an event entitled "Pod zvezdami Celjanov" ("Under the stars of the House of Celje") at Celje Castle in late summer every year, which features performances and representations of life in the Middle Ages. Music concerts also take place in the castle. Celje Castle is visited by approximately 60,000 people every year. An annual cultural entertainment event, Veronikini večeri, which is named after the character Veronika in the Slovenian opera Veronika Deseniška, also takes place in the castle. The evening features various concerts, theatre performances and other entertainment, and each year the organiser, in collaboration with the municipality of Celje, awards the Veronikina nagrada (prize) for poetry and the Zlatnik poezije (gold medal for poetry). The Veronikini večeri event has been taking place since 1996 and the Veronikina nagrada has equally been awarded since then. The Zlatnik poezije has been awarded since 2004.

== Sources ==
- Krones Franz (Gradec 1883). Die Freien von Saneck und ihre Chronik als Grafen von Cilli, 2. Teil, Die Cillier Chronik, (prevod Ludovik Modest Golia, Kronika grofov Celjskih, (Založba obzorja, Maribor 1972)), Celje: Kulturna skupnost v Celju.
- Orožen, Janko (1971). Zgodovina Celja in okolice, 1. del, v Celjski zbornik, Celje: Kulturna skupnost v Celju.
- Stopar, Aleš (2006). Stari grad Celje, Starožitnosti: vodnik Pokrajinskega muzeja Celje; 2, Celje: Pokrajinski muzej.
- Stopar, Ivan (1972). Stari grad nad Celjem. Maribor: Založba Obzorja.
- Stopar, Ivan (1977). Razvoj srednjeveške grajske arhitekture na Slovenskem Štajerskem. Ljubljana: Slovenska matica.
