= Canton of Draveil =

Coordinates: 48.69°N 2.41°E

The canton of Draveil is an administrative division of the Essonne department, Île-de-France region, northern France. Its borders were modified at the French canton reorganisation which came into effect in March 2015. Its seat is in Draveil.

It consists of the following communes:

1. Draveil
2. Étiolles
3. Montgeron (partly)
4. Saint-Germain-lès-Corbeil
5. Soisy-sur-Seine
