= Saint-Germain-lès-Corbeil =

Commune in Île-de-France, France

- Commune
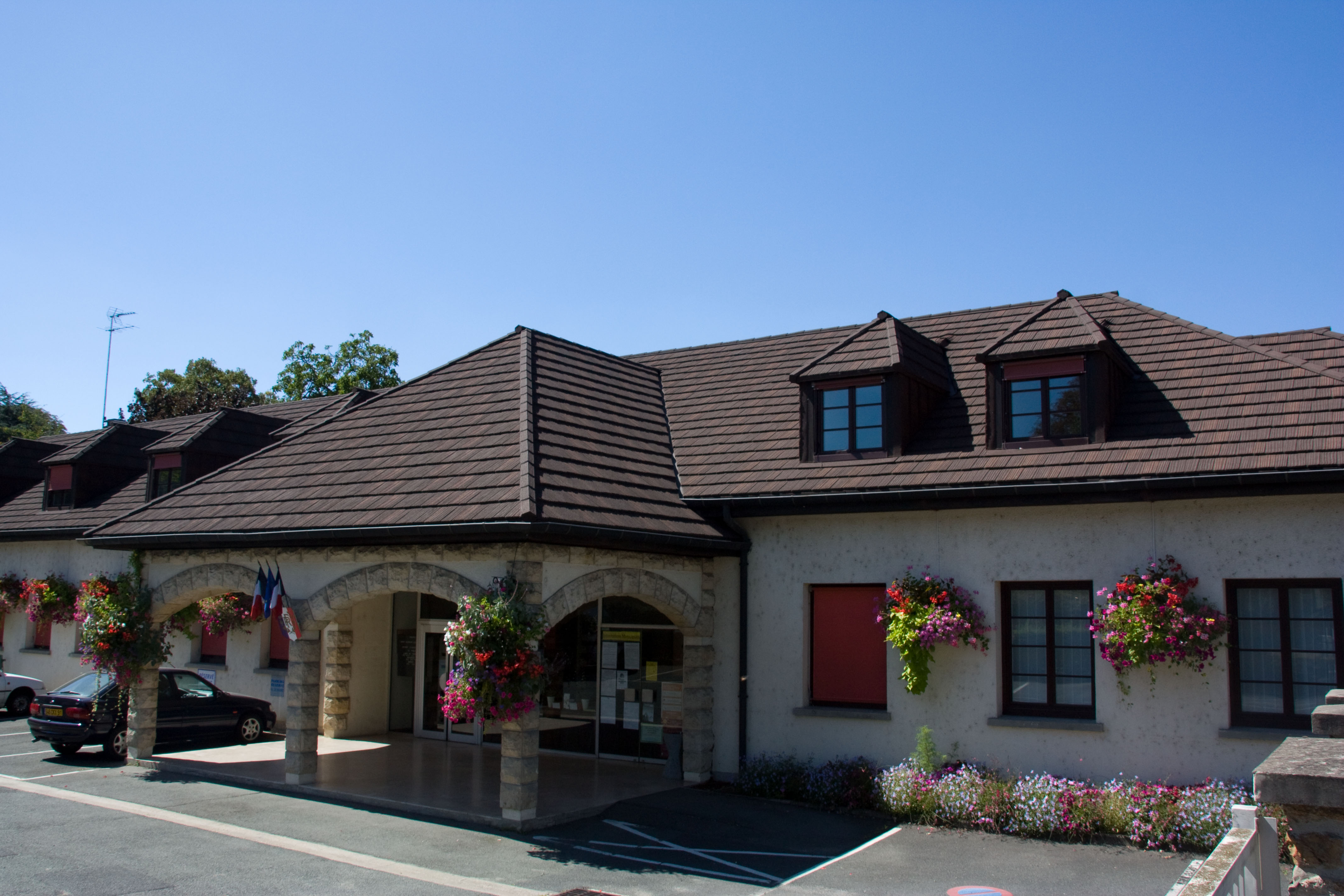
- The town hall in Saint-Germain-lès-Corbeil

- Coat of arms
- Location of Saint-Germain-lès-Corbeil
- Location within France Location within Île-de-France (region)
- Coordinates: 48°37′14″N 2°29′16″E
- Country: France
- Region: Île-de-France
- Department: Essonne
- Arrondissement: Évry
- Canton: Draveil
- Intercommunality: CA Grand Paris Sud Seine-Essonne-Sénart

Government
  - Mayor (2020–2026): Yann Pétel
- Area^{1}: 4.93 km^{2} (1.90 sq mi)
- Highest elevation: 93 m (305 ft)
- Lowest elevation: 34 m (112 ft)
- Population (2023): 7,469
  - Density: 1,520/km^{2} (3,920/sq mi)
- Time zone: UTC+01:00 (CET)
  - Summer (DST): UTC+02:00 (CEST)
- INSEE/Postal code: 91553 /91250
- ^{1} French Land Register data, which excludes lakes, ponds, glaciers > 1 km^{2} (0.386 sq mi or 247 acres) and river estuaries.

Saint-Germain-lès-Corbeil (French pronunciation: [sɛ̃ ʒɛʁmɛ̃ lɛ kɔʁbɛj], literally Saint-Germain near Corbeil) is a commune in the Essonne department in Île-de-France in northern France.

== Population ==
Inhabitants of Saint-Germain-lès-Corbeil are known as Saint-Germinois in French.

Historical population
Year	Pop.	±% p.a.
1968	650	—
1975	4,379	+31.33%
1982	4,462	+0.27%
1990	6,141	+4.07%
1999	7,051	+1.55%
2007	7,177	+0.22%
2012	7,310	+0.37%
2017	7,493	+0.50%
2023	7,469	−0.05%
Source: INSEE

== See also ==
- Communes of the Essonne department
