= Draveil =

Commune in Île-de-France, France

- Commune
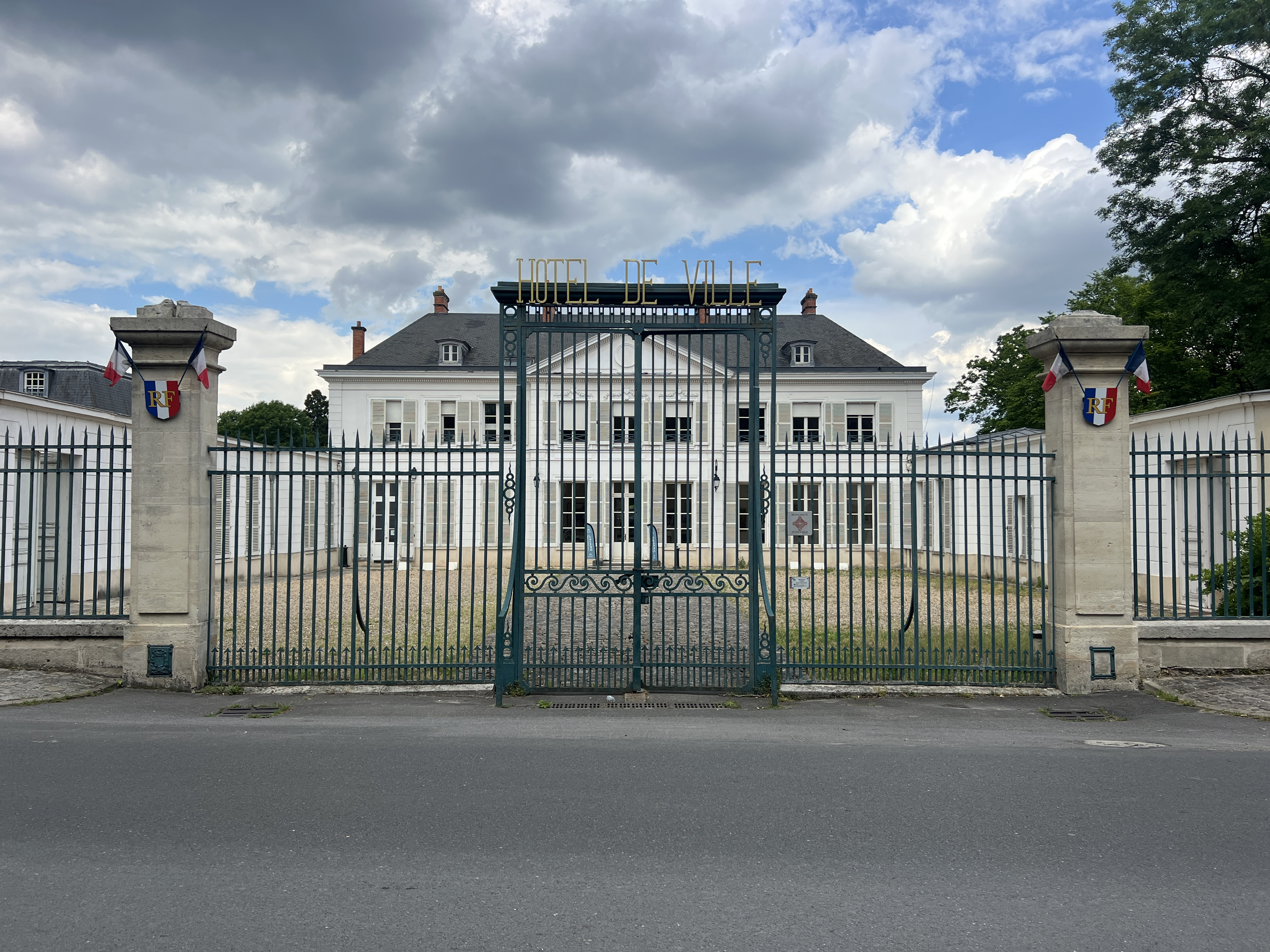
- The Hôtel de Ville

- Coat of arms

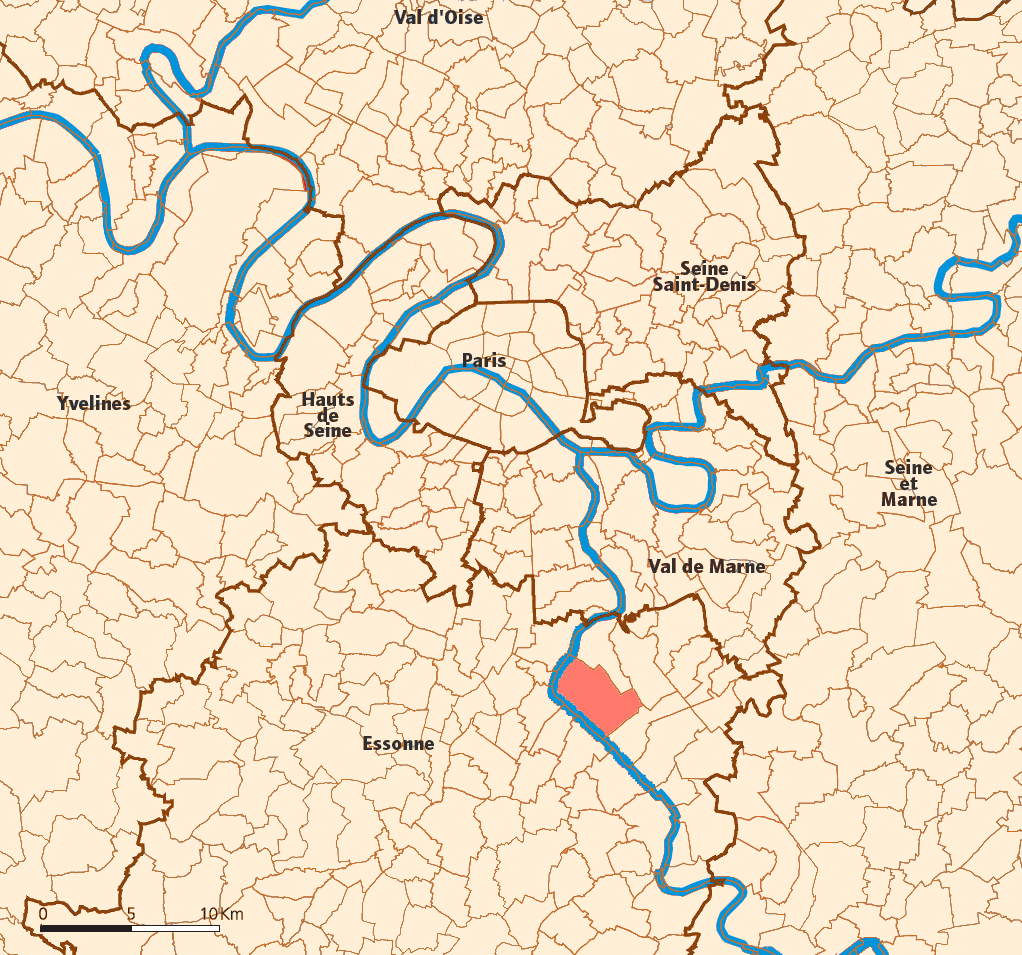
- Location (in red) within Paris inner and outer suburbs
- Location of Draveil
- Location within France Location within Île-de-France (region)
- Coordinates: 48°41′07″N 2°24′29″E
- Country: France
- Region: Île-de-France
- Department: Essonne
- Arrondissement: Évry
- Canton: Draveil
- Intercommunality: CA Val d'Yerres Val de Seine

Government
  - Mayor (2021–2026): Richard Privat
- Area^{1}: 15.75 km^{2} (6.08 sq mi)
- Highest elevation: 87 m (285 ft)
- Lowest elevation: 32 m (105 ft)
- Population (2023): 30,098
  - Density: 1,911/km^{2} (4,949/sq mi)
- Demonym: Draveillois
- Time zone: UTC+01:00 (CET)
  - Summer (DST): UTC+02:00 (CEST)
- INSEE/Postal code: 91201 /91210
- Website: www.draveil.fr
- ^{1} French Land Register data, which excludes lakes, ponds, glaciers > 1 km^{2} (0.386 sq mi or 247 acres) and river estuaries.

Draveil (French pronunciation: [dʁavɛj]) is a commune in the Essonne department in the southern outer suburbs of Paris, France. It is located 19.1 km (11.9 mi) from the centre of Paris at Notre-Dame. As of 2023, the population of the commune was 30,098. It was formally twinned with Hove, East Sussex in the United Kingdom.

With a score of 7.16/10, Draveil ranks 49th among the 100 best French towns with a population of over 20,000 inhabitants. This result is a survey conducted permanently among the French population and takes into account the following factors : environment, security, medical facilities, cultural events, sports, shops and transport.

== Geography ==
Draveil is situated between the right bank of the Seine and the Forest of Sénart which gives the whole town a very green environment. In fact, the official motto of the town in Latin is "Inter undas et arbores", which can be translated into English as "between water and trees", a reference to its location between the Seine and the Forest of Sénart. Hardly a third of Draveil's area has been developed, thus offering a preserved environment to its inhabitants. Draveil also hosts a large green park called the "Base de loisirs du Port-aux-Cerises" that covers over 175 hectares including trees, lakes and activity areas including a horse-riding club, an amusement park for children, an open-air swimming-pool, football field, tennis courts, acrobranche rope park, a small marina with berthing space for about thirty boats, etc.

Draveil consists of the main town Draveil, the former villages Champrosay and Mainville, and several newer housing developments. Champrosay was home to several artists in the 19th and early 20th century, including painters Marie Laurencin and Eugène Delacroix and writer Alphonse Daudet.

== History ==
Human presence in Draveil during the Neolithic period is suggested by the discovery of a menhir called the "Pierre à Mousseaux" dating from the fourth millennium BC and confirmed by the presence of tools and weapons in flint cut found in the Mainville quarter of Draveil. The Gauls named the place Dracvern meaning "the spirit of the Alder". The Romans called it Dravernum. In the Merovingian period a money minting facility was installed here, which minted one-third of a gold sol called "Draverno". The current Hôtel de Ville was built as a private residence in 1781.

== Demographics ==
Inhabitants of Draveil are known as Draveillois (masculine) and Draveilloises (feminine) in French.

Historical population

Year	Pop.	±% p.a.
1793	967	—
1800	1,119	+2.11%
1806	1,112	−0.10%
1821	1,132	+0.12%
1831	1,380	+2.00%
1836	1,318	−0.92%
1841	1,410	+1.36%
1846	1,614	+2.74%
1851	1,364	−3.31%
1856	1,737	+4.95%
1861	1,918	+2.00%
1866	1,602	−3.54%
1872	1,472	−1.40%
1876	1,655	+2.97%
1881	1,728	+0.87%
1886	2,021	+3.18%
1891	2,107	+0.84%
1896	2,329	+2.02%
1901	2,564	+1.94%

Year	Pop.	±% p.a.
1906	2,924	+2.66%
1911	3,314	+2.54%
1921	4,202	+2.40%
1926	5,929	+7.13%
1931	8,310	+6.99%
1936	10,316	+4.42%
1946	10,510	+0.19%
1954	12,335	+2.02%
1962	18,124	+4.93%
1968	25,352	+5.75%
1975	28,602	+1.74%
1982	26,543	−1.06%
1990	27,867	+0.61%
1999	28,093	+0.09%
2007	28,335	+0.11%
2012	29,063	+0.51%
2017	28,833	−0.16%
2023	30,098	+0.72%

Source: EHESS and INSEE (1968–2023)

== Administration ==
Draveil is part of the arrondissement of Évry, the canton of Draveil and the communauté d'agglomération Val d'Yerres Val de Seine. The mayor of Draveil from 1995 until 2021 was Georges Tron. He resigned on 25 May 2021 following his sentence and imprisonment for sexual assault and rape. He was succeeded by Richard Privat in June 2021.

== Schools ==
The town has eight preschools

- Ecole école Champrosay
- Ecole maternelle Antoine de Saint-Exupéry
- Ecole maternelle Hameau de Mainville
- Ecole maternelle Jean Jaurès
- Ecole maternelle Jules Ferry
- Ecole maternelle Le belvédère
- Ecole maternelle Le Parc de Villiers
- Ecole maternelle Pierre Brossolette

It also has ten primary schools

- Ecole école Champrosay
- Ecole élémentaire Antoine de Saint-Exupéry
- Ecole élémentaire Hameau de Mainville
- Ecole élémentaire Jean Jaurès
- Ecole élémentaire Jules Ferry
- Ecole élémentaire L Orme des Mazières
- Ecole élémentaire Le belvédère
- Ecole élémentaire Le Parc de Villiers
- Ecole primaire privée Notre-Dame (private)

There are three middle schools:

- Alphonse Daudet
- Eugène Delacroix and
- Notre Dame (private).

Draveil has one professional high school named "Lycée Nadar".

High schools around Draveil are either public like Lycée Rosa Parks in Montgéron.

There are three respected private institutions around Draveil:

- Institut de Saint Pierre in Brunoy
- Lycée Notre Dame de Sion in Évry and
- Lycée Saint Louis Saint Clément in Viry-Châtillon.

These private schools have a merit-based entrance scheme, have European curriculum, teach languages such as Chinese, etc.

== Facilities for children ==
The infant department at the Mairie supervises a wide-range of day-care centres namely a family crèche, collective crèches like L’Île-aux-Bambins and Pomme-de-Rainette, parent-run day-care centres like crèche Tétine et Doudou and two other day-care centres "Mazières" and "Villiers" that offer à la carte hours.

During school vacations, children are offered activities in "centres de loisirs" organised in the school premises in Villiers, Mazières, Jean-Jaurès, Brossolette, Belvédère, Champrosay, Jules-Ferry, Mainville, Saint-Exupéry and Pierre et Marie-Curie. Besides, the Mairie also organises a sports-oriented programme for kids between 8 and 14 called "Totalement sport".

== Sports ==
A wide range of sports facilities are available at the "Base de loisirs du Port-aux-Cerises" namely, canoëing, kayaking, sailing, football field, tennis courts, minigolf, skatepark and horse-riding.

A rowing club and a yachting club are based on the banks of the Seine. Two other swimming pools (Caneton and Mainville) that offer different activities like aquagym are also available.

In the Bergeries quarter of the town, the COSEC Ferdinand-Buisson offers facilities for handball, table-tennis, badminton, gymnastics and martial arts. Other sports complex around the town organise activities such as volleyball, tennis, athletics, basketball, boxing, roller-blading, etc.

== Health ==
A survey in 2010 found that there were thirty-eight doctors (general practitioners and specialists), fourteen dental surgeons, eleven pharmacists, etc.

== Public transport ==
Many buses ply between many areas in Draveil round-the-clock on a regular basis. Fares for the buses are included in the Navigo pass. Buses from Draveil also serve Juvisy, Orly Airport, Rungis International Market and other neighbouring towns. Draveil is not directly linked to the Paris Métro network. This is a result of a decision taken by the local authorities in order to keep land developers at bay and preserve the town's provincial charm. The Paris metro network can be reached from Juvisy station, which is across the Seine. Juvisy station has two RER lines to reach the centre of Paris within 15 minutes: RER line C and RER line D. This station is located in the neighboring commune of Juvisy-sur-Orge, 2 km (1.2 mi) from the town center of Draveil.

== Famous inhabitants ==
A list of famous people who were either born or lived in Draveil include :

- Jean-Jacques Annaud, cinematographer
- Alphonse Daudet, writer
- Eugène Delacroix, painter
- Edmond de Goncourt, writer
- Charles Euphrasie Kuwasseg, painter
- Paul Lafargue, Marxist political writer/activist
- Marie Laurencin painter
- Nadar, photographer
- Henri Romagnesi, mycologist
- Joffrey Torvic, footballer
- Ivan Turgenev, writer
- Frédéric Vasseur, motorsport engineer/manager

== Gallery ==
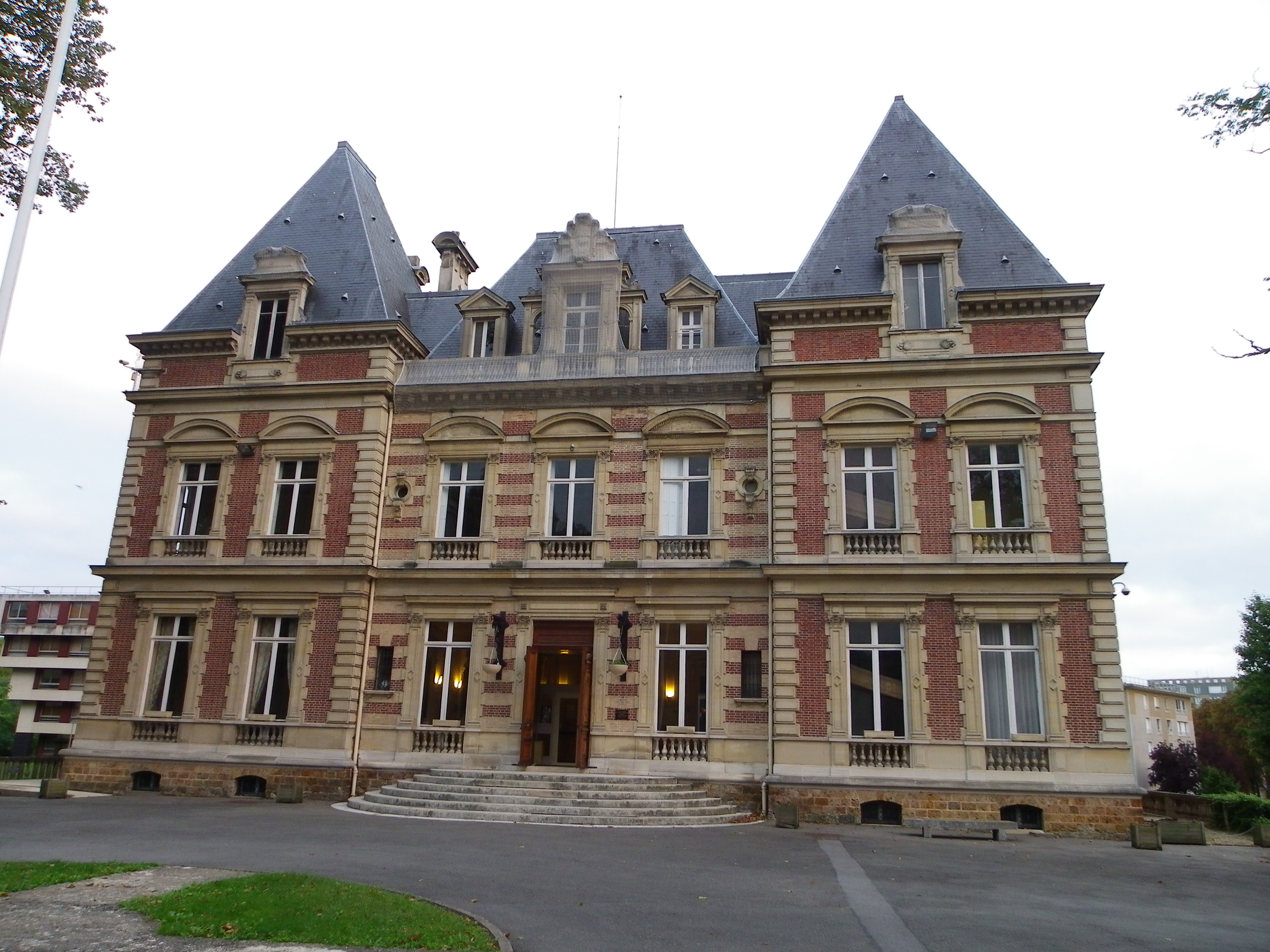
The Château des Bergeries

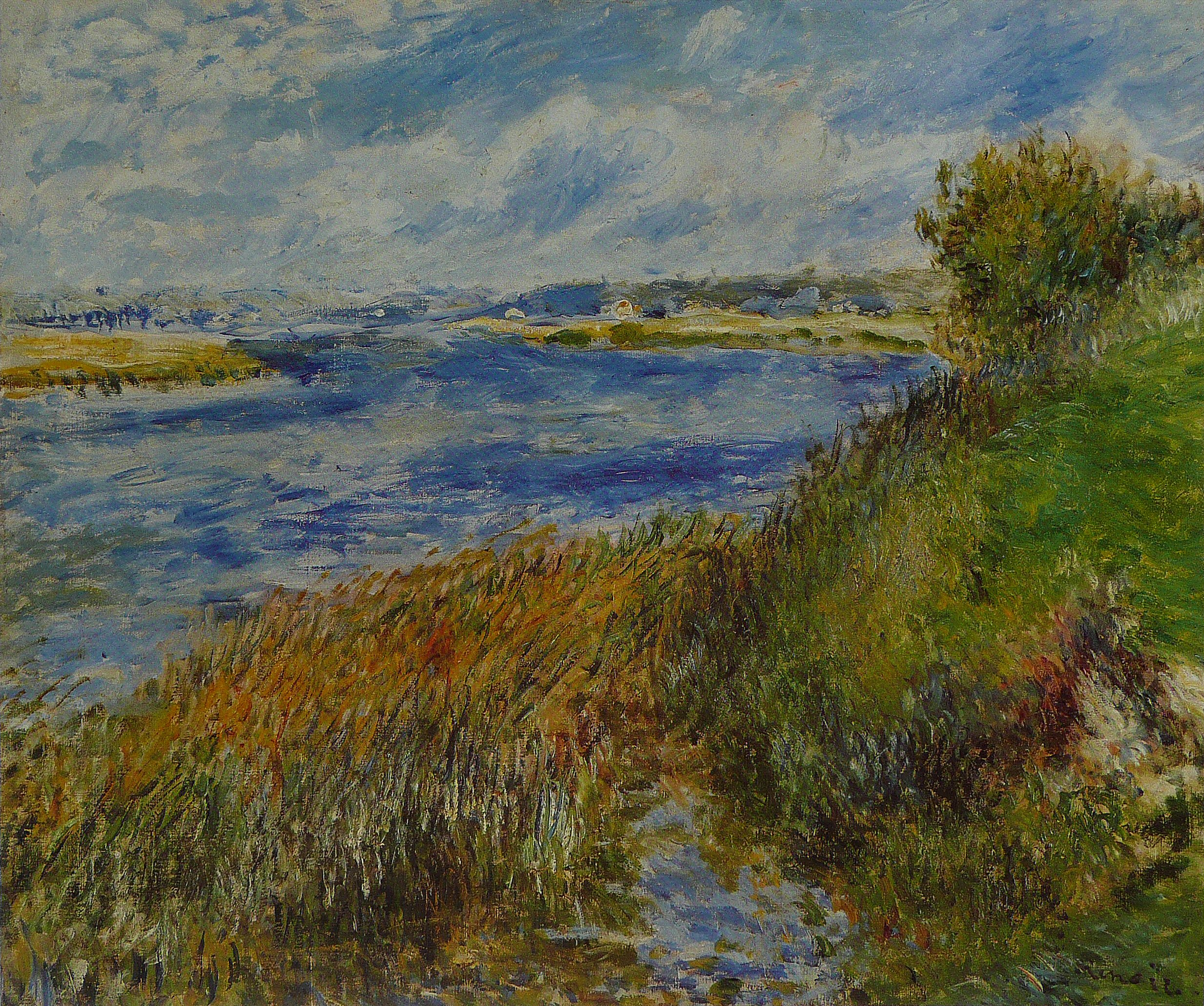
Pierre-Auguste Renoir, La Seine à Champrosay (1876)

== See also ==
- Communes of the Essonne department
- Draveil-Villeneuve-Saint-Georges strike
