= Étiolles =

Commune in Île-de-France, France

- Commune
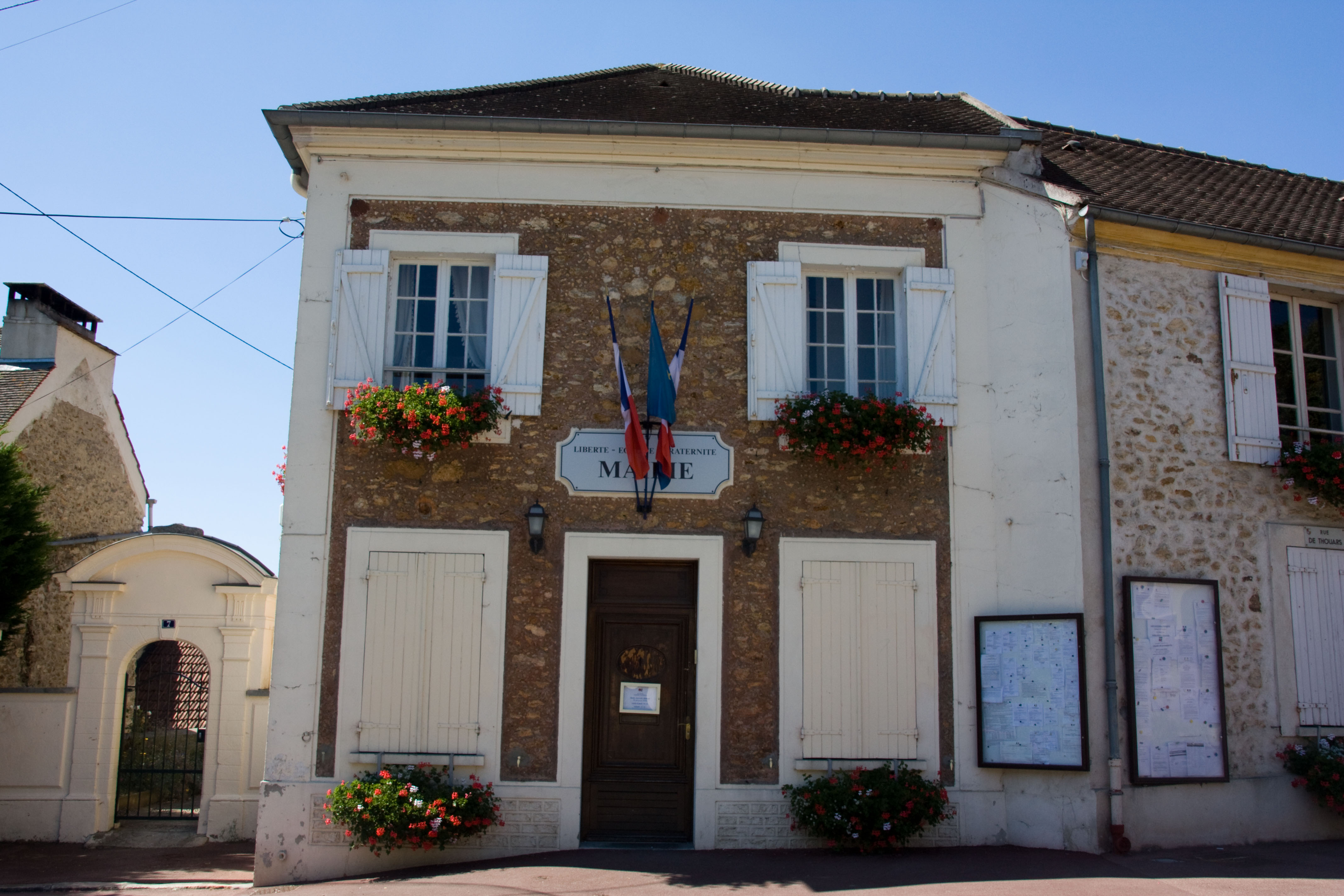
- The town hall of Étiolles

- Coat of arms
- Location of Étiolles
- Location within France Location within Île-de-France (region)
- Coordinates: 48°38′12″N 2°28′21″E
- Country: France
- Region: Île-de-France
- Department: Essonne
- Arrondissement: Évry
- Canton: Draveil
- Intercommunality: CA Grand Paris Sud Seine-Essonne-Sénart

Government
  - Mayor (2020–2026): Amalia Duriez
- Area^{1}: 11.65 km^{2} (4.50 sq mi)
- Highest elevation: 86 m (282 ft)
- Lowest elevation: 32 m (105 ft)
- Population (2023): 3,105
  - Density: 266.5/km^{2} (690.3/sq mi)
- Time zone: UTC+01:00 (CET)
  - Summer (DST): UTC+02:00 (CEST)
- INSEE/Postal code: 91225 /91450
- ^{1} French Land Register data, which excludes lakes, ponds, glaciers > 1 km^{2} (0.386 sq mi or 247 acres) and river estuaries.

Étiolles (French pronunciation: [etjɔl]) is a commune in the Essonne department in Île-de-France in northern France, twenty-seven kilometers southeast of Paris.

== Population ==
Historical population
Year	Pop.	±% p.a.
1968	1,208	—
1975	1,530	+3.43%
1982	1,570	+0.37%
1990	2,107	+3.75%
1999	2,548	+2.13%
2007	3,040	+2.23%
2012	3,135	+0.62%
2017	3,161	+0.17%
2023	3,105	−0.30%
Source: INSEE

Inhabitants of Étiolles are known as Étiollais in French.

== See also ==
- Communes of the Essonne department
