= Dobriša Vas =

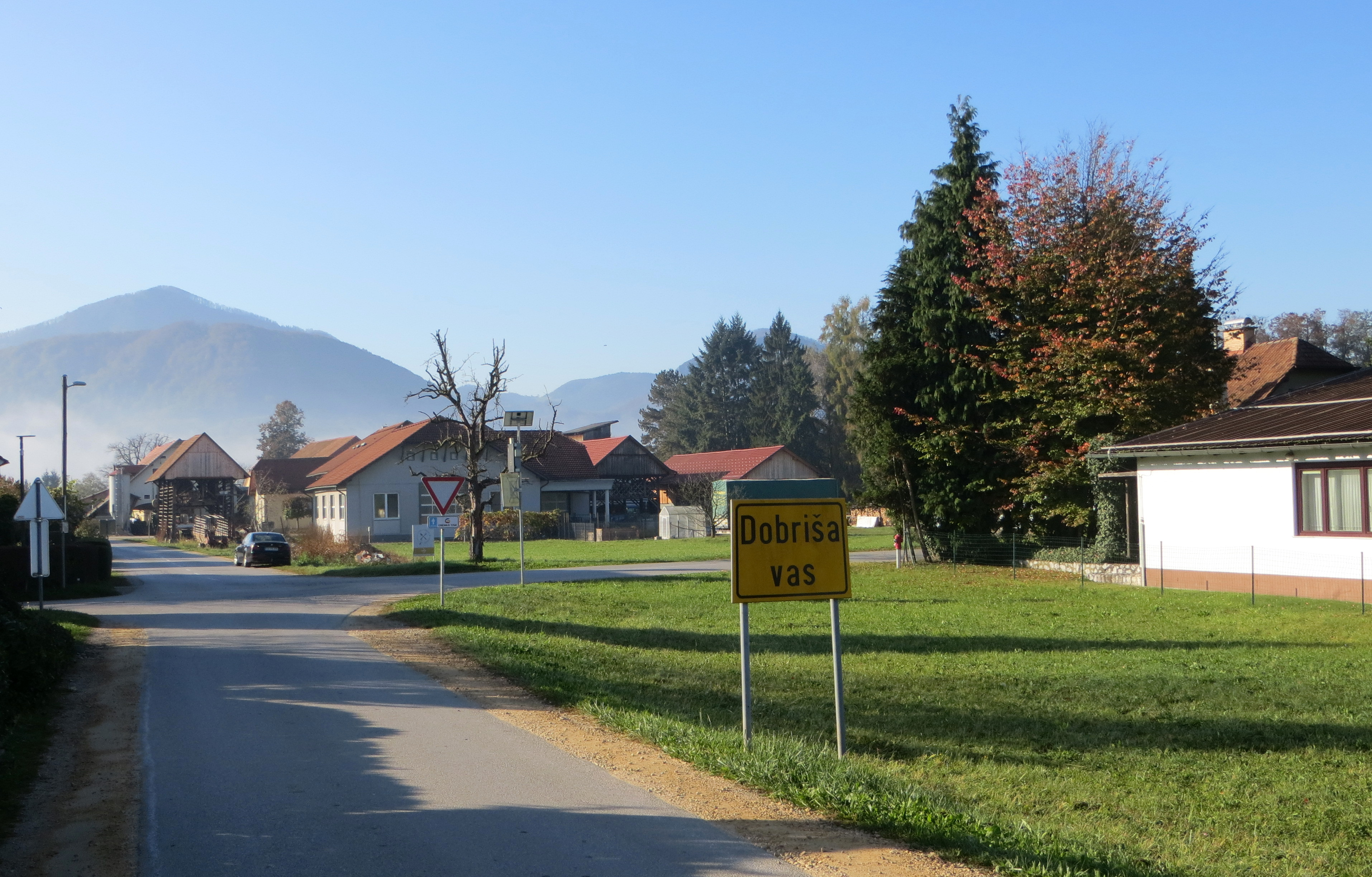

- Location in Slovenia
- Coordinates: 46°14′24.98″N 15°10′33.94″E
- Country: Slovenia
- Traditional region: Styria
- Statistical region: Savinja
- Municipality: Žalec

Area
  - Total: 1.29 km^{2} (0.50 sq mi)
- Elevation: 249.5 m (819 ft)

Population (2002)
  - Total: 421

Dobriša Vas (pronounced [dɔˈbɾiːʃa ˈʋaːs]; Slovene: Dobriša vas, German: Dobritschendorf) is a settlement in the Municipality of Žalec in east-central Slovenia. It lies on the left bank of the Savinja River southeast of the town of Žalec. The area is part of the traditional region of Styria. The municipality is now included in the Savinja Statistical Region.
