= List of sessions of the 8th National Assembly of the Republic of Slovenia =

Regular session can be convened by the Speaker based on the:

- resolution of the Assembly,
- resolution of the Council, or
- proposal of the Government.

Extraordinary sessions must be convened by the Speaker in 15 days based on the:

- request by the 25% of the MPs or
- request of the President of the Republic.

Extraordinary sessions must also be convened by the Speaker on the urgent matters based on the:

- proposal of the Government or
- resolution of the Council,

if Assembly must:

- pass a bill under urgent legislative procedure,
- make a decision on an urgent matter,
- make a decision considering mandates of the MPs, immunity, elections or appointments or
- make a decision based on the Article 92 of the Constitution.

List of session of the 8th National Assembly:

== Regular sessions ==
Regular sessions are usually held in the 3rd week of the month and last for a week.

=== 1st Regular Session - 22 June 2018, 11:00 ===
Convened by:	President Borut Pahor (On the basis of the Paragraph 3 of the Article 81 of the Constitution)
Council session:	Informal meeting of temporary political group's leaders with then-Speaker Milan Brglez (Article 10 of the Rules of Procedure)
Presided over by:	Peter Jožef Česnik (SAB) before election Speaker Matej Tonin (NSi) after election
Documents:

Addresses by President Borut Pahor and Speaker of the 7th National Assembly Milan Brglez.

Matej Tonin (NSi) was elected Speaker with 80 of 90 votes. Commission for Public Office and Elections was formed and Jože Tanko (SDS) was elected president and Tina Heferle (LMŠ) was elected vice-president of the commission. Session was interrupted so that Commission could hold its session to confirm mandates of the MPs. It was continued after the session to elect Speaker.

Officially first round of the election of the new Prime Minister began.

==== Election of the speaker ====
Candidate	Voted	In favour	Against	Invalid
Matej Tonin	89	80	9	1

== Extraordinary sessions ==
=== 1st Extraordinary Session - 3 July 2018, 12:00 ===
Convened by:	Speaker Matej Tonin (NSi) (on the basis of the Paragraph 2 of Article 58 and Paragph 2 of Article 60 of the Rules of Procedure)
Council session:	1st Regular Session of the Council - 29 June 2018 -
Presided over by:	Speaker Matej Tonin (NSi)
Documents:

Formation of the Committee on Foreign Policy, Committee on EU Affairs and Joint Committee.

=== 2nd Extraordinary Session - 10 July 2018, 12:00 ===
Convened by:	Speaker Matej Tonin (NSi) (on the basis of the Paragraph 2 of Article 58 and Paragph 2 of Article 60 of the Rules of Procedure)
Council session:	2nd Regular Session of the Council - 6 July 2018 -
Presided over by:	Speaker Matej Tonin (NSi)
Documents:

=== 3rd Extraordinary Session - 19 July 2018, 12:00 ===
Convened by:	Speaker Matej Tonin (NSi) (on the basis of the Paragraph 2 of Article 58 and Paragph 2 of Article 60 of the Rules of Procedure)
Council session:	3rd Regular Session of the Council - 17 July 2018 -
Presided over by:	Speaker Matej Tonin (NSi)
Documents:

=== 4th Extraordinary Session - 27 July 2018, 12:00 ===
Convened by:	Speaker Matej Tonin (NSi) (on the basis of the Paragraph 2 of Article 58 and Paragph 2 of Article 60 of the Rules of Procedure)
Council session:	4th Regular Session of the Council - 27 July 2018 -
Presided over by:	Speaker Matej Tonin (NSi)
Documents:

Notification of the President of the Republic that he will not propose a candidate for Prime Minister in the first round of elections after Janez Janša and Marjan Šarec let him know that neither of them currently has a majority of votes in the Assembly. Second round of elections of Prime Minister began.

=== 5th Extraordinary Session - 17 and 23 August 2018, 10:00 ===
Convened by:	Speaker Matej Tonin (NSi) (on the basis of the Paragraph 2 of Article 58 and Paragph 2 of Article 60 of the Rules of Procedure)
Council session:	6th Regular Session of the Council - 16 August 2018 -
Presided over by:	Speaker Matej Tonin (NSi)
Documents:

Session will began on Friday, 17 August, with election of the Prime Minister Marjan Šarec. Session will be suspended until Thursday, 23 August, when it will continue with elections of Deputy-Speakers.

==== Election of the prime minister ====
Candidate	Voted	In favour	Against	Invalid
Marjan Šarec	87	55	31	1

==== Election of the deputy-speaker ====
Candidate	Voted	In favour	Against	Invalid
Tina Heferle	83	66	8	9

=== 6th Extraordinary Session - 23 August 2018, 30 mins after 5th Extraordinary Session ===
Convened by:	Speaker Matej Tonin (NSi) (on the basis of the Paragraph 2 of Article 58 and Paragph 2 of Article 60 of the Rules of Procedure)
Council session:	7th Regular Session of the Council - 22 August 2018 -
Presided over by:	Acting-Speaker Tina Heferle (LMŠ)
Documents:

==== Election of the deputy-speaker ====
Candidate	Voted	In favour	Against	Invalid
Jože Tanko	85	74	3	8

==== Election of the speaker ====
Candidate	Voted	In favour	Against	Invalid
Dejan Židan	60	49	8	7

=== 7th Extraordinary Session - 29 August 2018, 13:00 ===
Convened by:	Speaker Dejan Židan (SD) (on the basis of the Paragraph 2 of Article 58 and Paragph 2 of Article 60 of the Rules of Procedure)
Council session:	8th Regular Session of the Council - 28 August 2018 -
Presided over by:	Speaker Dejan Židan (SD); Deputy-Speaker Tina Heferle (LMŠ)
Documents:

Formation of working bodies, elections of the third Deputy-Speaker and Secretary-General

==== Election of the deputy-speaker ====
Candidate	Voted	In favour	Against	Invalid
Branko Simonovič	78	67	7	4

==== Election of the secretary-general ====
Candidate	Voted	In favour	Against
Uršula Zore Tavčar	79	76	0

=== 8th Extraordinary Session - 13 September 2018, 10:00 ===
Convened by:	Speaker Dejan Židan (SD) (on the basis of the Paragraph 2 of Article 58 and Paragph 2 of Article 60 of the Rules of Procedure)
Council session:	8th Regular Session of the Council - 12 September 2018 -
Presided over by:	Speaker Dejan Židan (SD); Deputy-Speaker Tina Heferle (LMŠ)
Documents:

==== Election of the 13th Government ====
Candidate	Voted	In favour	Against
Ministers of the 13th Government			

=== 17th Extraordinary Session - 13 December 2018, 12.00 ===
Convened by:	Deputy-Speaker Tina Heferle (LMŠ) (on the ground of the Article 20(2), Article 58(1) and Article 60(2) of the Rules of Procedure)
Council session:	20th Regular Session of the Council - 7 December 2018 -
Presided over by:	Speaker Dejan Židan (SD); Deputy-Speaker Tina Heferle (LMŠ) Deputy-Speaker Jože Tanko (SDS) Deputy-Speaker Branko Simonovič (LMŠ)
Documents:

=== 18th Extraordinary Session - 21 December 2018, 9:00 ===
Convened by:	Speaker Dejan Židan (SD) (on the ground of the Article 58(1) and Article 60(2) of the Rules of Procedure)
Council session:	22nd Regular Session of the Council - 20 December 2018 -
Presided over by:	Speaker Dejan Židan (SD); Deputy-Speaker Tina Heferle (LMŠ) Deputy-Speaker Jože Tanko (SDS) Deputy-Speaker Branko Simonovič (LMŠ)
Documents:

=== 19th Extraordinary Session - 12 February 2019, 10:00 ===
Convened by:	Speaker Dejan Židan (SD) (on the ground of the Article 58(1) and Article 60(2) of the Rules of Procedure)
Council session:	25th Regular Session of the Council - 11 February 2019 -
Presided over by:	Speaker Dejan Židan (SD); Deputy-Speaker Tina Heferle (LMŠ) Deputy-Speaker Jože Tanko (SDS) Deputy-Speaker Branko Simonovič (LMŠ)
Documents:

=== 20th Extraordinary Session - 20 March 2019, 11:00 ===
Convened by:	Speaker Dejan Židan (SD) (on the ground of the Article 58(2) and Article 60(2) of the Rules of Procedure)
Council session:	28th Regular Session of the Council - 18 March 2019 -
Presided over by:	Speaker Dejan Židan (SD); Deputy-Speaker Tina Heferle (LMŠ) Deputy-Speaker Jože Tanko (SDS) Deputy-Speaker Branko Simonovič (LMŠ)
Documents:

=== 21st Extraordinary Session - 25 April 2019, 9:00 ===
Convened by:	Speaker Dejan Židan (SD) (on the ground of the Article 58(1) and Article 60(1) of the Rules of Procedure)
Council session:	32nd Regular Session of the Council - 10 May 2019 -
Presided over by:	Speaker Dejan Židan (SD); Deputy-Speaker Tina Heferle (LMŠ) Deputy-Speaker Jože Tanko (SDS) Deputy-Speaker Branko Simonovič (LMŠ)
Documents:

=== 22nd Extraordinary Session - 13 May 2019, 12:00 ===
Convened by:	Speaker Dejan Židan (SD) (on the ground of the Article 58(1) and Article 60(2) of the Rules of Procedure)
Council session:	34th Regular Session of the Council - 10 May 2019 -
Presided over by:	Speaker Dejan Židan (SD); Deputy-Speaker Tina Heferle (LMŠ) Deputy-Speaker Jože Tanko (SDS) Deputy-Speaker Branko Simonovič (LMŠ)
Documents:

=== 23rd Extraordinary Session - 17 May 2019, 10:00 ===
Convened by:	Speaker Dejan Židan (SD) (on the ground of the Article 58(1) and Article 60(2) of the Rules of Procedure)
Council session:	34th Regular Session of the Council - 10 May 2019 -
Presided over by:	Speaker Dejan Židan (SD); Deputy-Speaker Tina Heferle (LMŠ) Deputy-Speaker Jože Tanko (SDS) Deputy-Speaker Branko Simonovič (LMŠ)
Documents:

=== 24th Extraordinary Session - 21 June 2019, 9:00 ===
Convened by:	Deputy-Speaker Tina Heferle (LMŠ) (on the ground of the Article 20(2), Article 58(1) and Article 60(1) of the Rules of Procedure)
Council session:	37th Regular Session of the Council - 14 June 2019 -
Presided over by:	Speaker Dejan Židan (SD); Deputy-Speaker Tina Heferle (LMŠ) Deputy-Speaker Jože Tanko (SDS) Deputy-Speaker Branko Simonovič (LMŠ)
Documents:

==== Voting on the interpellation ====
Interpellated	Voted	In favour	Against
Karl Erjavec, Minister of Defence			

== Other sessions ==
=== Solemn Session - 24 June 2018, 19:00 ===
Session on the occasion of the Statehood Day. Address by the Speaker Matej Tonin.

Attended by President of the Republic Borut Pahor, President of the National Council Alojz Kovšca, President of the Constitutional Court Jadranka Sovdat, President of the Supreme Court Damijan Florjančič, former President of the Republic Milan Kučan, Human Rights Ombudsman Vlasta Nussdorfer and others.

== See also ==
- List of sessions of the working bodies of the 8th National Assembly of the Republic of Slovenia
- Members of the 8th National Assembly of the Republic of Slovenia
