= List of sessions of the working bodies of the 8th National Assembly of the Republic of Slovenia =

Regular session of the working bodies can be convened by the President of the working body 14 days before the session.

Urgent session can be convened by in shorter time based on the:

- resolution of the Assembly,
- resolution of the Council,
- request by the one third of the members of the working body or
- request by the political group.

If President of the working body does not convene the session, it can be convened by the Speaker and presided over by the oldest vice-president.

List of session of the working bodies of the 8th National Assembly:

== Committees ==
=== Committee on Agriculture, Forestry and Food (CAFF) ===
Session	Date	Time	Documents	Comments
1st Urgent	4 September 2018	9:00		Hearing of Aleksandra Pivec, candidate for Minister of Agriculture, Forestry and Food
2nd Urgent	13 September 2018	9:30		

=== Committee on Culture (CC) ===
Session	Date	Time	Documents	Comments
1st Urgent	5 September 2018	9:00		Hearing of Dejan Prešiček, candidate for Minister of Culture

=== Committee on Defence (CD) ===
Session	Date	Time	Documents	Comments
1st Urgent	6 September 2018	15:00		Hearing of Karl Erjavec, candidate for Minister of Defence

=== Committee on Education, Science, Sport and Youth (CESSY) ===
Session	Date	Time	Documents	Comments
1st Urgent	4 September 2018	15:00		Hearing of Jernej Pikalo, candidate for Minister of Education, Science and Sport

=== Committee on EU Affairs (CEU) ===
Session	Date	Time	Documents	Comments
1st Regular	13 July 2018	9:00		PARTIALLY CLOSED; JOINT session with CFP (1st item on the agenda - Session of the FAC on 16 July 2018)
2nd Regular	20 July 2018	9:00		
1st Urgent	4 September 2018	15:00		JOINT session with CE (Hearing of Marko Bandelli, candidate for Minister without Portfolio responsible for Development, Strategic Projects and Cohesion)
3rd Regular	14 September 2018	9:00		PARTIALLY CLOSED

=== Committee on Finance (CF) ===
Session	Date	Time	Documents	Comments
1st Urgent	6 September 2018	12:00		Hearing of Andrej Bertoncelj, candidate for Minister of Finance
1st Regular	20 September 2018	10:00		

=== Committee on Foreign Policy (CFP) ===
Session	Date	Time	Documents	Comments
1st Urgent	9 July 2018	10:00		CLOSED; discussing lawsuit against Croatia for not implementing Final Award of Arbitration Tribunal
1st Regular	13 July 2018	9:00		CLOSED; JOINT session with CEU (Session of the FAC on 16 July 2018)
2nd Urgent	17 August 2018	8:00		
3rd Urgent	4 September 2018	12:00		Hearing of Miro Cerar, candidate for Minister of Foreign Affairs
2nd Regular	26 September 2018	9:00		

=== Committee on Health (CH) ===
Session	Date	Time	Documents	Comments
1st Urgent	5 September 2018	12:00		Hearing of Samo Fakin, candidate for Minister of Health

=== Committee on Infrastructure, Environment and Spatial Planning (CIESP) ===
Session	Date	Time	Documents	Comments
1st Urgent	5 September 2018	9:00		Hearings of Jure Leben, candidate for Minister of Environment and Spatial Planning and Alenka Bratušek, candidate for Minister of Infrastructure

=== Committee on Justice (CJ) ===
Session	Date	Time	Documents	Comments
1st Urgent	6 September 2018	9:00		Hearing of Andreja Katič, candidate for Minister of Justice
2nd Urgent	19 September 2018	9:00		
1st Regular	26 September 2018	9:00		

=== Committee on Labour, Family, Social Policy and Disability (CLFSPD) ===
Session	Date	Time	Documents	Comments
1st Urgent	6 September 2018	12:00		Hearing of Ksenija Klampfer, candidate for Minister of Labour, Family, Social Affairs and Equal Opportunities

=== Committee on the Economy (CE) ===
Session	Date	Time	Documents	Comments
1st Urgent	4 September 2018	15:00		JOINT session with CEU (Hearing of Marko Bandelli, candidate for Minister without Portfolio responsible for Development, Strategic Projects and Cohesion)
2nd Urgent	6 September 2018	9:00		Hearing of Zdravko Počivalšek, candidate for Minister of Economic Development and Technology
3rd Urgent	12 September 2018	8:30		

=== Committee on the Interior, Public Administration and Local Self-Government (CIPALSG) ===
Session	Date	Time	Documents	Comments
1st Urgent	4 September 2018	9:00		Hearings of Boštjan Poklukar, candidate for Minister of Interior and Tugomir Kodelja, candidate for Minister of Public Administration
2nd Urgent	10 September 2018	12:00		Hearing of Rudi Medved, candidate for Minister of Public Administration
1st Regular	27 September 2018	13:00		

=== Joint Committee (JC) ===
Session	Date	Time	Documents	Comments
1st Urgent	5 July 2018	11:00		
2nd Urgent	11 July 2018	11:00		CLOSED; discussing proposals for changes of the agreement between EC and Slovenia about selling the NLB
3rd Urgent	18 July 2018	10:00		discussing law protecting the NLB from procedures before Croatian courts and potential executions based on the verdicts
4th Urgent	14 August 2018	11:00		

== Standing Commissions ==
=== Commission for Petitions, Human Rights and Equal Opportunities (CPHREO) ===
Session	Date	Time	Documents	Comments

=== Commission for Public Office and Elections (CPOE) ===
Session	Date	Time	Documents	Comments
1st Regular	22 June 2018	12:00		Confirmation of the mandates of MPs
1st Urgent	28 June 2018	9:00		
2nd Urgent	19 July 2018	10:00		PARTIALLY CLOSED; discussing criminal proceeding against Franc Rosec (SDS)
3rd Urgent	23 August 2018	9:00		
2nd Regular	20 September 2018	9:00		PARTIALLY CLOSED; discussing criminal proceeding against Dejan Kaloh (SDS)

=== Commission for Relations with Slovenes in Neighbouring and Other Countries (CRSNOC) ===
Session	Date	Time	Documents	Comments
1st Urgent	5 September 2018	15:00		Hearing of Peter Jožef Česnik, candidate for Minister without portfolio for Slovenian diaspora

=== Commission for the National Communities (CNC) ===
Session	Date	Time	Documents	Comments

=== Commission for the Rules of Procedure (CRP) ===
Session	Date	Time	Documents	Comments

=== Constitutional Commission (ConstC) ===
Session	Date	Time	Documents	Comments

== Supervisory commissions ==
=== Commission for Public Finance Control (CPFC) ===
Session	Date	Time	Documents	Comments
1st Regular	27 September 2018	9:00		

=== Commission for the Supervision of Intelligence and Security Services (CSISS) ===
Session	Date	Time	Documents	Comments
1st Urgent	17 September 2018	12:00		CLOSED; Report of responsible services on paramilitary units in Slovenia
1st Regular	25 September 2018	14:00		CLOSED

== Other bodies ==
=== Council of the Speaker (Council) ===
Session	Date	Time	Documents	Comments
1st Regular	29 June 2018	10:00		1st Extraordinary Session of the Assembly
2nd Regular	6 July 2018	11:00		2nd Extraordinary Session of the Assembly
3rd Regular	17 July 2018	9:00		3rd Extraordinary Session of the Assembly
4th Regular	27 July 2018	10:00		4th Extraordinary Session of the Assembly
5th Regular	31 July 2018	12:00		
6th Regular	16 August 2018	10:00		5th Extraordinary Session of the Assembly
7th Regular	22 August 2018	10:00		6th Extraordinary Session of the Assembly
8th Regular	28 August 2018	16:00		7th Extraordinary Session of the Assembly
9th Regular	12 September 2018	11:00		8th Extraordinary Session of the Assembly

== See also ==
- List of sessions of the 8th National Assembly of the Republic of Slovenia
- Members of the 8th National Assembly of the Republic of Slovenia
- Members of the working bodies of the 8th National Assembly of the Republic of Slovenia
