= Members of the 8th National Assembly of the Republic of Slovenia =

Members of the 8th National Assembly, elected on 3 June 2018.

== Nationwide MPs ==
- MP - MPs in the 7th NA
- (MP) - MP before, but not in the 7th NA
- MP* - elected MP in the 7th NA, but elected for minister/prime minister

=== Slovenian Democratic Party (SDS) ===
MP	Positions	Comments
Branko Grims MP	President of the Constitutional Commission; Member of the Committee on the Interior, Public Administration and Local Self-Government; Member of the Committee on Defence; Member of the Committee on EU Affairs; Member of the Committee on Foreign Policy; Leader of the Delegation to the CEI PD; President of the friendship group for the Federal Republic of Germany	
Marko Pogačnik MP	Vice-President of the Committee in Finance; Member of the Committee on EU Affairs; Member of the Commission for Public Office and Elections; Member of the Committee in the Economy; Substitute member of the Commission of Inquiry for detection of abuses and non-economic behavior in the DUTB	
Žan Mahnič MP	Vice-President of the Commission for the Supervision of Intelligence and Security Services; Member of the Committee on Education, Science, Sport and Youth; Member of the Committee on the Interior, Public Administration and Local Self-Government; Member of the Committee on Defence; Substitute member of the Commission of Inquiry for investigating the alleged money laundering in Nova Kreditna Banka Maribor (NKBM), the suspected unlawful financing of the Slovenian Democratic Party and the suspected illegal financing of the election campaign for the early elections to the National Assembly in 2018; Substitute member of the Delegation to the NATO Parliamentary Assembly; Former: Member of the Committee on Foreign Policy	
Danijel Krivec MP	Leader; Member of the Commission for Public Office and Elections; Member of the Council of the Speaker; Member of the Constitutional Commission	
Zvonko Černač (MP)	President of the Committee on the Interior, Public Administration and Local Self-Government; Member of the Commission for the Supervision of Intelligence and Security Services; Member of the Committee on Infrastructure, Environment and Spatial Planning; Member of the Commission for Public Finance Control; Former: Deputy Leader; Member of the Commission for Public Office and Elections; Member of the Joint Committee	
Eva Irgl MP	President of the Commission for Petitions, Human Rights and Equal Opportunities; Member of the Committee on the Interior, Public Administration and Local Self-Government; Member of the Committee on Justice	
Andrej Šircelj MP	Vice-President of the Committee on Foreign Policy; Member of the Committee on Finance; Member of the Commission for Public Finance Control; Member of the Constitutional Commission; Leader of the Delegation to the Parliamentary Assembly of the Council of Europe; Former: Member of the Committee on Foreign Policy	
Alenka Jeraj (MP)	Member of the Commission for Public Office and Elections; Member of the Committee on EU Affairs; Member of the Committee on Culture; Member of the Committee on Health; President of the Friendship group for the Argentine Republic; President of the Friendship group for the Federative Republic of Brazil; President of the Friendship group for the Republic of Bulgaria; Former: Member of the Joint Committee	
Anže Logar MP	President of the Commission for Public Finance Control; Member of the Committee on Finance; Member of the Committee on Foreign Policy; Member of the Commission of Inquiry for detection of abuses and non-economic behavior in the DUTB; Former: Member of the Committee on EU Affairs	
Jože Tanko MP	Deputy-Speaker (from 23 August 2018); Member of the Commission for Relations with Slovenes in Neighbouring and Other Countries; Member of the Commission for the Rules of Procedure; Member of the Commission for Public Office and Elections; Member of the Council of the Speaker of the National Assembly; Member of the Constitutional Commission; Former: President of the Commission for Public Office and Elections	
Janez Janša MP	Member of the Committee on Foreign Policy; Member of the Commission for the Supervision of Intelligence and Security Services; Member of the Commission for Public Finance Control; Member of the Constitutional Commission	
Boris Doblekar	Member of the Committee on Agriculture, Forestry and Food; Member of the Committee on EU Affairs; Member of the Committee on Infrastructure, Environment and Spatial Planning; Member of the Commission for the National Communities	
Jelka Godec MP	President of the Commission of Inquiry for determining the responsibility of holders of public office in the child cardiology programme and procurement of medical supplies and equipment; Vice-President of the Committee on Health; Member of the Committee on Education, Science, Sport and Youth; Member of the Committee on Labour, Family, Social Policy and Disability; Former: Deputy Leader; Member of the Commission for Public Office and Elections; Member of the Joint Committee	
Nada Brinovšek MP	Deputy Leader; Member of the Commission for the National Communities; Member of the Committee on Health; Member of the Committee on Agriculture, Forestry and Food; Substitute member of the Commission of Inquiry for determining the responsibility of holders of public office in the child cardiology programme and procurement of medical supplies and equipment; Former: Member of the Joint Committee	
Franc Rosec	Deputy Leader; Member of the Committee on Finance; Member of the Committee on the Economy; Member of the Committee on Infrastructure, Environment and Spatial Planning	
Anja Bah Žibert MP	Vice-President of the Commission for Public Office and Elections; Member of the Committee on Justice; Member of the Committee on the Interior, Public Administration and Local Self-Government; Member of the Committee on Agriculture, Forestry and Food; Substitute member of the Delegation to the Parliamentary Assembly of the OSCE	
Franci Kepa	Member of the Commission for Relations with Slovenes in Neighbouring and Other Countries; Member of the Committee on Infrastructure, Environment and Spatial Planning; Member of the Committee on Defence; Member of the Committee on EU Affairs	
Tomaž Lisec MP	Vice-President of the Committee on Education, Science, Sport and Youth; Member of the Committee on Agriculture, Forestry and Food; Member of the Commission for the Rules of Procedure; Member of the Constitutional Commission; President of the Friendship group for the Czech Republic; President of the Friendship group for Montenegro; President of the Friendship group for the Slovak Republic	
Karmen Furman	President of the Commission for the Rules of Procedure; Member of the Commission for Petitions, Human Rights and Equal Opportunities; Member of the Committee on Labour, Family, Social Policy and Disability; Member of the Committee on Finance	
Bojan Podkrajšek MP	Vice-President of the Committee on Infrastructure, Environment and Spatial Planning; Member of the Committee on Education, Science, Sport and Youth; Member of the Committee on Culture; Member of the Committee on Defence	
Dejan Kaloh	Vice-President of the Committee on Justice; Member of the Committee on Culture; Member of the Committee on Health; Member of the Commission for Petitions, Human Rights and Equal Opportunities; Member of the Commission of Inquiry for investigating the alleged money laundering in NKBM; Substitute member of the Delegation to the Parliamentary Assembly of the Union for the Mediterranean; Substitute member of theDelegation of the National Assembly in the Group for Joint Parliamentary Supervision of EUROPOL; Former: Member of the Committee on EU Affairs; Member of the Joint Committee	
Franc Breznik MP	President of the Committee on Agriculture, Forestry and Food; Member of the Committee on the Economy; Member of the Committee on Justice; Member of the Commission for Relations with Slovenes in Neighbouring and Other Countries; Substitute member of the Delegation to the PA SEECP; Former: Member of the Commission for Public Office and Elections	
Marijan Pojbič MP	Vice-President of the Committee on Labour, Family, Social Policy and Disability; Member of the Committee on Health; Member of the Commission for the National Communities	
Jožef Lenart	Member of the Committee on Labour, Family, Social Policy and Disability; Member of the Committee on Culture; Member of the Committee on Defence	
Suzana Lep Šimenko MP	Vice-President of the Committee on the Economy; Member of the Committee on Finance; Member of the Committee on Labour, Family, Social Policy and Disability; Member of the Delegation to the Parliamentary Assembly of the Union for the Mediterranean; Member of the IPU National Group in the National Assembly; President of the Friendship group for the Republic of India; President of the Friendship group for the Republic of Poland; President of the Friendship group for the Republic of Korea	

=== List of Marjan Šarec (LMŠ) ===
MP	Positions	Comments
Igor Peček	President of the Committee on EU Affairs; Member of the Committee on the Interior, Public Administration and Local Self-Government; Member of the Commission of Inquiry for detection of abuses and non-economic behavior in the DUTB; Former: Vice-President of the Committee on Agriculture, Forestry and Food; Vice-President of the Committee on the Interior, Public Administration and Local Self-Government; Member of the Committee on EU Affairs; Member of the Committee on the Economy	
Edvard Paulič	President of the Committee on Infrastructure, Environment and Spatial Planning; Member of the Committee on Agriculture, Forestry and Food; Member of the Committee on the Economy; Member of the Constitutional Commission; Substitute member of the Commission of Inquiry for detection of abuses and non-economic behavior in the DUTB; Former: Vice-President of the Committee on the Interior, Public Administration and Local Self-Government; Member of the Joint Committee; Member of the Committee on Finance	
Robert Pavšič	Vice-President of the Committee on Defence; Member of the Committee on Finance; Member of the Committee on Health; Substitute member of the Commission of Inquiry for investigating the alleged money laundering in NKBM; Leader of the Delegation to the NATO Parliamentary Assembly; Former: Member of the Committee on EU Affairs; Member of the Committee on Justice; Member of the Committee on Infrastructure, Environment and Spatial Planning	
Jerca Korče	Deputy Leader; Member of the Committee on Defence; Member of the Committee on Infrastructure, Environment and Spatial Planning; Member of the Commission for the Supervision of Intelligence and Security Services; Former: Member of the Committee on Labour, Family, Social Policy and Disability; Member of the Committee on Foreign Policy; Member of the Commission for the National Communities	Youngest MP
Andreja Zabret	Vice-President of the Committee on Finance; Member of the Committee on Health; Member of the Commission for the National Communities; Substitute member of the Commission of Inquiry for determining the responsibility of holders of public office in the child cardiology programme and procurement of medical supplies and equipment; Substitute member of the Delegation to the Parliamentary Assembly of the Council of Europe; President of the Friendship group for the Commonwealth of Australia; President of the Friendship group for the Republic of Iceland; Former: Member of the Committee on Foreign Policy	
Tina Heferle	Deputy-Speaker (from 23 August 2018); Member of the Commission for the Rules of Procedure; Member of the Committee on the Interior, Public Administration and Local Self-Government; Member of the Committee on Justice; Member of the Constitutional Commission; Member of the Council of the Speaker of the National Assembly; Leader of the Delegation of the National Assembly in the Group for Joint Parliamentary Supervision of EUROPOL; Former: Vice-President of the Commission for Public Office and Elections; Member of the Commission for Public Office and Elections	
Brane Golubović (MP)	Leader; Member of the Commission for Public Office and Elections; Member of the Council of the Speaker; Former: Member of the Commission for the Supervision of Intelligence and Security Services; Member of the Committee on Infrastructure, Environment and Spatial Planning	
Darij Krajčič	President of the Committee on EU Affairs; Member of the Committee on Agriculture, Forestry and Food; Member of the Committee on Infrastructure, Environment and Spatial Planning; Former: Member of the Committee on EU Affairs	
Jože Lenart	Vice-President of the Committee on Health; Member of the Committee on Finance; Member of the Commission for Public Finance Control; Member of the Committee on Defence; Member of the Commission of Inquiry for determining the responsibility of holders of public office in the child cardiology programme and procurement of medical supplies and equipment; Former: Member of the Committee on Foreign Policy	
Lidiija Divjak Mirnik	Vice-President of the Commission for Public Office and Elections; Member of the Committee on Education, Science, Sport and Youth; Member of the Committee on Culture; Member of the Committee on Infrastructure, Environment and Spatial Planning; Member of the IPU National Group in the National Assembly; Substitute member of the Delegation to the PA SEECP; President of the Friendship group for the Grand-Duchy of Lusembourg; Former: Member of the Commission for Public Office and Elections; Member of the Committee on Foreign Policy	
Aljaž Kovačič	Vice-President of the Commission for Petitions, Human Rights and Equal Opportunities; Vice-President of the Commission of Inquiry for investigating the alleged money laundering in NKBM; Member of the Committee on Labour, Family, Social Policy and Disability; Member of the Committee on Education, Science, Sport and Youth; Member of the Committee on Foreign Policy	
Karla Urh	Vice-President of the Commission for Relations with Slovenes in Neighbouring and Other Countries; Member of the Committee on Culture; Member of the Committee on Justice; Member of the Committee on Agriculture, Forestry and Food; President of the Friendship group for the Kingdom of Sweden	Substitute MP (for Marjan Šarec)
Nina Maurovič	Vice-President of the Committee on Agriculture, Forestry and Food; Member of the Committee on Labour, Family, Social Policy and Disability; Member of the Commission for the Rules of Procedure; Member of the Committee on Justice; Member of the Committee on Foreign Policy; President of the Friendship group for the Kingdom of Norway	Substitute MP (for Rudi Medved)
Nik Prebil	Vice-President of the Committee on the Interior, Public Administration and Local Self-Government; Member of the Committee on Foreign Policy; Member of the Committee on EU Affairs; Member of the Commission for the National Communities; Member of the Constitutional Commission; President of the Friendship group for the Republic of Lithuania	
Former members:
Marjan Šarec	Member of the Joint Committee	Elected Prime Minister
Rudi Medved	President of the Committee on Infrastructure, Environment and Spatial Planning; Member of the Committee on the Interior, Public Administration and Local Self-Government; Member of the Committee on Defence; Member of the Commission for the Rules of Procedure; Former: President of the Joint Committee; Member of the Commission for Public Office and Elections	Elected Minister of Public Administration

=== Social Democrats (SD) ===
MP	Positions	Comments
Samo Bevk (MP)	President of the Committee on Defence; Member of the Committee on Culture; Member of the Committee on Health; Member of the Commission for Relations with Slovenes in Neighbouring and Other Countries; Member of the IPU National Group in the National Assembly; Substitute member of the Delegation to the PA NATO; Former: Member of the Committee on Foreign Policy	
Meira Hot	Vice-President of the Committee on Justice; Member of the Committee on the Economy; Member of the Committee on EU Affairs; Member of the Commission for Petitions, Human Rights and Equal Opportunities; Member of the Commission of Inquiry for detection of abuses and non-economic behavior in the DUTB; Substitute member of the Delegation to the Parliamentary Assembly of the Union for the Mediterranean; President of the Friendship group for the Italian Republic	
Matjaž Nemec MP	President of the Committee on Foreign Policy; Member of the Committee on Culture; Member of the Committee on Defence; Member of the Commission for the Supervision of Intelligence and Security Services; Substitute member of the Commission of Inquiry for detection of abuses and non-economic behavior in the DUTB; Leader of the IPU National Group in the National Assembly (ex officio); President of the Friendship group for the French Republic; President of the Friendship group for the Republic of Azerbaijan; President of the Friendship group for the Arab Republic of Egypt; President of the Friendship group for the United States of America	
Marko Koprivc	Vice-President of the Committee on Education, Science, Sport and Youth; Member of the Committee on Labour, Family, Social Policy and Disability; Member of the Commission for Relations with Slovenes in Neighbouring and Other Countries; Member of the Commission for the National Communities; Member of the Commission of Inquiry for investigating the alleged money laundering in NKBM; President of the Friendship group for Bosnia and Herzegovina; Former: Member of the Committee on EU Affairs	
Predrag Baković	Vice-President of the Committee on the Interior, Public Administration and Local Self-Government; Member of the Committee on Agriculture, Forestry and Food; Member of the Committee on Justice; Substitute member of the Commission of Inquiry for investigating the alleged money laundering in NKBM; Substitute member of the Delegation to the JPSG Europol; Former: Member of the Joint Committee	
Jani Prednik	Vice-President of the Commission of Inquiry for determining the responsibility of holders of public office in the child cardiology programme and procurement of medical supplies and equipment; Member of the Committee on Agriculture, Forestry and Food; Member of the Committee on Finance; Member of the Committee on Infrastructure, Environment and Spatial Planning; President of the Friendship group for the Republic of Croatia; President of the Friendship group for the Republic of Cyprus; President of the Friendship group for the Hellenic Republic; President of the Friendship group for the Republic of Latvia; President of the Friendship group for the Republic of Malta	
Matjaž Han MP	Leader; Member of the Commission for Public Office and Elections; Member of the Council of the Speaker; Member of the Committee on Finance; Member of the Commission for the Rules of Procedure; Member of the Constitutional Commission; President of the Friendship group for the Russian Federation	
Soniboj Knežak	Vice-President of the Committee on the Economy; Member of the Committee on Labour, Family, Social Policy and Disability; Member of the Committee on Infrastructure, Environment and Spatial Planning; Former: Member of the Joint Committee	
Bojana Muršič MP	Deputy Leader; Member of the Commission for Public Office and Elections; Member of the Committee on the Interior, Public Administration and Local Self-Government; Member of the Committee on Health; Member of the Commission for Public Finance Control; Substitute member of the Commission of Inquiry for determining the responsibility of holders of public office in the child cardiology programme and procurement of medical supplies and equipment; Substitute member of the Delegation to the CEI Parliamentary Dimension; President of the Friendship group for Ireland; President of the Friendship group for the Kingdom of Spain	
Dejan Židan MP*	Speaker (from 23 August 2018); President of the Council of the Speaker; Member of the Constitutional Commission; Leader of the Delegation to the SEECP Parliamentary Assembly (ex officio)	
Former members:
Milan Brglez MP	Vice-President of the Committee on EU Affairs; Member of the Committee on Foreign Policy; Member of the Committee on Education, Science, Sport and Youth; Member of the Constitutional Commission; Member of the Delegation to the Parliamentary Assembly of the Council of Europe; President of the Friendship group for People's Republic of China	Joined later, elected MEP

=== Modern Centre Party (SMC) ===
MP	Positions	Comments
Mateja Udovč	Vice-President of the Commission for the Rules of Procedure; Member of the Committee on Finance; Member of the Committee on Education, Science, Sport and Youth; Member of the Commission for Public Finance Control; Member of the Commission for Relations with Slovenes in Neighbouring and Other Countries; Former: Member of the Joint Committee	
Gregor Perič	President of the Committee on the Economy; Member of the Committee on Infrastructure, Environment and Spatial Planning; Member of the Committee on EU Affairs; Substitute member of the Commission of Inquiry for detection of abuses and non-economic behavior in the DUTB; Leader of the Delegation to the Parliamentary Assembly of the OSCE; President of the Friendship group for the Kingdom of Belgium; Former: President of the Committee on EU Affairs	
Monika Gregorčič	Vice-President of the Committee on Foreign Policy; Vice-President of the Commission of Inquiry for detection of abuses and non-economic behavior in the DUTB; Member of the Committee on Finance; Member of the Committee on the Economy; Member of the Commission for the Supervision of Intelligence and Security Services; Member of the Delegation to the PA NATO; Member of the IPU National Group in the National Assembly; President of the Friendship group for the Kingdom of Denmark; President of the Friendship group for the Republic of Turkey; Former: Member of the Committee on EU Affairs	
Janja Sluga MP	Deputy Leader; Member of the Committee on the Interior, Public Administration and Local Self-Government; Member of the Committee on Labour, Family, Social Policy and Disability; Member of the Committee on Culture; Member of the Commission for Public Office and Elections; Substitute member of the Commission of Inquiry for investigating the alleged money laundering in NKBM; Member of the IPU National Group in the National Assembly	
Igor Zorčič MP	Leader; Member of the Commission for Public Office and Elections; Member of the Council of the Speaker; Member of the Committee on Infrastructure, Environment and Spatial Planning; Member of the Constitutional Commission; Substitute member of the Delegation to the CEI Parliamentary Dimension; President of the Friendship group for the Kingdom of the Netherlands	
Branislav Rajić MP	President of the Committee on Education, Science, Sport and Youth; Member of the Committee on Culture; Member of the Committee on Foreign Policy; Leader of the Delegation to the Parliamentary Assembly of the Union for the Mediterranean; Member of the IPU National Group in the National Assembly; President of the Friendship group for the Republic of Finland; President of the Friendship group for Japan; President of the Friendship group for the United Kingdom of Great Britain and Northern Ireland; President of the Friendship group for the Swiss Confederation	
Mojca Žnidarič	Vice-President of the Committee on Labour, Family, Social Policy and Disability; Member of the Committee on Health; Member of the Commission for Petitions, Human Rights and Equal Opportunities; Member of the Commission for the National Communities; Member of the Commission of Inquiry for determining the responsibility of holders of public office in the child cardiology programme and procurement of medical supplies and equipment	
Gregor Židan	Vice-President of the Constitutional Commission; Member of the Committee on Agriculture, Forestry and Food; Member of the Committee on Defence; Member of the Committee on EU Affairs	Substitute MP (for Zdravko Počivalšek)
Dušan Verbič		Substitute MP (for Milan Brglez)
Former members:
Jani Möderndorfer MP	President of the Commission of Inquiry for investigating the alleged money laundering in NKBM; Member of the Committee on the Interior, Public Administration and Local Self-Government; Member of the Committee on Justice; Member of the Committee on Health; Substitute member of the Commission of Inquiry for determining the responsibility of holders of public office in the child cardiology programme and procurement of medical supplies and equipment	Substitute MP (For Miro Cerar); Joined LMŠ
Milan Brglez MP	No positions while member.	Joined PS SD, later elected MEP
Miro Cerar MP*	Elected Minister of Foreign Affairs: Member of the Committee on the Interior, Public Administration and Local Self-Government; Member of the Committee on Justice; Member of the Committee on Health; Former: Member of the Committee on Foreign Policy	Elected Minister of Foreign Affairs
Zdravko Počivalšek	Elected Minister of Economic Development and Technology: Member of the Committee on Agriculture, Forestry and Food; Member of the Committee on Defence; Member of the Committee on EU Affairs; Former: Member of the Joint Committee	Elected Minister of Economic Development and Technology

=== The Left (Levica) ===
MP	Positions	Comments
Miha Kordiš MP	Vice-President of the Committee on Defence; Member of the Committee on Labour, Family, Social Policy and Disability; Member of the Committee on Education, Science, Sport and Youth; Former: Member of the Joint Committee; Member of the Committee on Agriculture, Forestry and Food	
Matej Tašner Vatovec MP	Leader; Member of the Commission for Public Office and Elections; Member of the Council of the Speaker; Member of the Committee on Foreign Policy; Member of the Commission for the National Communities; Member of the Committee on Defence; Member of the Constitutional Commission; Member of the IPU National Group in the National Assembly; President of the Friendship group for Palestine	
Violeta Tomić MP	President of the Committee on Culture; Member of the Commission for Relations with Slovenes in Neighbouring and Other Countries; Member of the Commission for Public Office and Elections; Member of the Committee on Agriculture, Forestry and Food; Member of the Delegation to the Parliamentary Assembly of the Council of Europe; Former: Vice-President of the Joint Committee	
Luka Mesec MP	Vice-President of the Committee on Finance; Member of the Committee on Infrastructure, Environment and Spatial Planning; Member of the Commission for Public Finance Control; Member of the Commission for the Rules of Procedure; Substitute member of the Commission of Inquiry for detection of abuses and non-economic behavior in the DUTB; Former: Member of the Commission for Public Office and Elections	
Nataša Sukič	Deputy Leader; Member of the Committee on EU Affairs; Member of the Committee on Infrastructure, Environment and Spatial Planning; Member of the Committee on the Interior, Public Administration and Local Self-Government; Member of the Commission for Petitions, Human Rights and Equal Opportunities; Member of the Commission of Inquiry for investigating the alleged money laundering in NKBM; Member of the IPU National Group in the National Assembly; Member of the Delegation to the SEECP Parliamentary Assembly	
Željko Cigler	Member of the Committee on Infrastructure, Environment and Spatial Planning; Member of the Committee on Education, Science, Sport and Youth; Member of the Committee on Justice; Member of the Committee on Health; Member of the Commission of Inquiry for detection of abuses and non-economic behavior in the DUTB; Substitute member of the Commission of Inquiry for determining the responsibility of holders of public office in the child cardiology programme and procurement of medical supplies and equipment	
Primož Siter	Vice-President of the Committee on Labour, Family, Social Policy and Disability; Member of the Committee on Culture; Member of the Committee on Defence; Member of the Committee on Foreign Policy; Substitute member of the Commission of Inquiry for investigating the alleged money laundering in NKBM	
Franc Trček MP	President of the Committee on Health; Member of the Committee on the Economy; Member of the Committee on EU Affairs; Member of the Commission of Inquiry for determining the responsibility of holders of public office in the child cardiology programme and procurement of medical supplies and equipment; Member of the Delegation to the CEI Parliamentary Dimension; Member of the IPU National Group in the National Assembly; President of the Friendship group for the Portuguese Republic; President of the Friendship group for the Republic of Estonia; President of the Friendship group for Canada; President of the Friendship group for the Republic of Kosovo; President of the Friendship group for Romania; President of the Friendship group for the Republic of Albania	
Boštjan Koražija	Member of the Committee on Labour, Family, Social Policy and Disability; Member of the Committee on Agriculture, Forestry and Food; Member of the Committee on the Economy; Member of the Committee on the Interior, Public Administration and Local Self-Government; Former: Member of the Committee on Finance	

=== New Slovenia (NSi) ===
MP	Positions	Comments
Matej Tonin MP	President of the Commission for the Supervision of Intelligence and Security Services; Member of the Committee on Defence; Member of the Committee on Foreign Policy; Member of the Constitutional Commission; Member of the Delegation to the NATO Parliamentary Assembly; Former: Leader; Speaker (22 June 2018 – 23 August 2018)	
Jernej Vrtovec MP	President of the Commission of Inquiry for detection of abuses and non-economic behavior in the DUTB; Member of the Committee on the Economy; Member of the Committee on the Interior, Public Administration and Local Self-Government; Member of the Commission for Public Finance Control; Member of the Delegation to the Parliamentary Assembly of the OSCE; President of the Friendship group for the State of Israel; Former: President of the Committee on Justice; Vice-President of the Committee on EU Affairs	
Iva Dimic MP	President of the Committee on Justice; Member of the Committee on Agriculture, Forestry and Food; Member of the Committee on Health; Member of the Committee on Labour, Family, Social Policy and Disability; Member of the Commission for Relations with Slovenes in Neighbouring and Other Countries; Member of the IPU National Group; President of the Friendship group for Republic of North Macedonia	
Blaž Pavlin	Deputy Leader; Member of the Committee on the Interior, Public Administration and Local Self-Government; Member of the Committee on EU Affairs; Member of the Commission for Petitions, Human Rights and Equal Opportunities; Member of the Commission for the Rules of Procedure; Substitute member of the Commission of Inquiry for investigating the alleged money laundering in NKBM; Substitute member of the Commission of Inquiry for determining the responsibility of holders of public office in the child cardiology programme and procurement of medical supplies and equipment; Deputy Leader of the Delegation to the SEECP Parliamentary Assembly	
Aleksander Reberšek	Member of the Committee on the Economy; Member of the Committee on Infrastructure, Environment and Spatial Planning; Member of the Commission for Public Finance Control; Member of the Commission of Inquiry for investigating the alleged money laundering in NKBM	
Jožef Horvat MP	Leader; Member of the Commission for Public Office and Elections; Member of the Council of the Speaker; Member of the Committee on Foreign Policy; Member of the Committee on Finance; Substitute member of the Commission of Inquiry for detection of abuses and non-economic behavior in the DUTB; Substitute member of the Delegation to the Parliamentary Assembly of the Union for the Mediterranean	
Tadeja Šuštar		Substitute MP (for Ljudmila Novak)
Former members:
Ljudmila Novak MP	President of the Commission for Relations with Slovenes in Neighbouring and Other Countries; Member of the Committee on Education, Science, Sport and Youth; Member of the Committee on Culture; Member of the Commission for the National Communities; Substitute member of the delegation to the Parliamentary Assembly of the Council of Europe; President of the Friendship group for the Republic of Austria; Former: Member of the Joint Committee; Former Deputy Leader	Elected MEP

=== Party of Alenka Bratušek (SAB) ===
MP	Positions	Comments
Franc Kramar	Member of the Committee on Agriculture, Forestry and Food; Member of the Committee on Finance; Member of the Committee on the Economy; Member of the Commission of Inquiry for detection of abuses and non-economic behavior in the DUTB; Substitute member of the Commission of Inquiry for investigating the alleged money laundering in NKBM	
Vojko Starović	President of the Committee on Labour, Family, Social Policy and Disability; Member of the Committee on Health; Member of the Commission for Public Finance Control; Member of the Commission for the Rules of Procedure; Substitute member of the Commission of Inquiry for determining the responsibility of holders of public office in the child cardiology programme and procurement of medical supplies and equipment; President of the Friendship group for Ukraine; Former: Member of the Joint Committee	
Andrej Rajh	Deputy Leader; Vice-President of the Committee on Infrastructure, Environment and Spatial Planning; Member of the Committee on Defence; Member of the Committee on EU Affairs; Member of the Committee on Foreign Policy; Member of the Commission of Inquiry for determining the responsibility of holders of public office in the child cardiology programme and procurement of medical supplies and equipment; Substitute member of the Commission of Inquiry for detection of abuses and non-economic behavior in the DUTB; Member of the IPU National Group in the National Assembly; Substitute member of the Delegation to the Parliamentary Assembly of the OSCE	
Maša Kociper	Leader; Member of the Council of the Speaker; Member of the Commission for Public Office and Elections; Member of the Committee on the Interior, Public Administration and Local Self-Government; Member of the Committee on Justice; Member of the Constitutional Commission; Substitute member of the Delegation to the Parliamentary Assembly of the Council of Europe; Member of the Delegation to the CEI Parliamentary Dimension	Substitute MP (for Peter Jožef Česnik)
Marko Bandelli	Vice-President of the Committee on Culture; Member of the Committee on Education, Science, Sport and Youth; Member of the Commission for Relations with Slovenes in Neighbouring and Other Countries; Member of the Commission for Petitions, Human Rights and Equal Opportunities; Member of the Commission of Inquiry for investigating the alleged money laundering in NKBM; Former: Leader; Vice-President of the Commission for Public Office and Elections; Member of the Commission for Public Office and Elections; Member of the Council of the Speaker	Elected Minister without Portfolio for Development, Strategic Projects and Cohesion, resigned and returned to NA as MP
Former members:
Andrej Šušmelj	Vice-President of the Committee on Culture; Member of the Commission for Relations with Slovenes in Neighbouring and Other Countries; Member of the Commission for Petitions, Human Rights and Equal Opportunities; Member of the Committee on Education, Science, Sport and Youth	Substitute MP (for Marko Bandelli)
Peter Jožef Česnik	Member of the Committee on the Interior, Public Administration and Local Self-Government; Member of the Committee on Justice; Member of the Commission for Public Office and Elections; Former: Member of the Committee on EU Affairs	Oldest MPElected Minister without portfolio for Slovenian diaspora

=== Democratic Party of Pensioners of Slovenia (DeSUS) ===
MP	Positions	Comments
Branko Simonovič	Deputy-Speaker (from 29 August 2018); Member of the Committee on Agriculture, Forestry and Food; Member of the Committee on Health; Member of the Commission for the Supervision of Intelligence and Security Services; Member of the Commission for Relations with Slovenes in Neighbouring and Other Countries; Member of the Council of the Speaker of the National Assembly; Member of the Commission of Inquiry for investigating the alleged money laundering in NKBM; Member of the Commission of Inquiry for determining the responsibility of holders of public office in the child cardiology programme and procurement of medical supplies and equipment; Former: Deputy Leader	
Robert Polnar	President of the Committee on Finance; Member of the Committee on the Interior, Public Administration and Local Self-Government; Member of the Committee on the Economy; Member of the Commission for Public Finance Control; Substitute member of the Commission of Inquiry for detection of abuses and non-economic behavior in the DUTB; Former: Member of the Joint Committee	
Ivan Hršak MP	President of the Commission for Public Office and Elections; Member of the Committee on Infrastructure, Environment and Spatial Planning; Member of the Committee on EU Affairs; Member of the Committee on Foreign Policy; Member of the Commission for the Rules of Procedure; Substitute member of the Commission of Inquiry for determining the responsibility of holders of public office in the child cardiology programme and procurement of medical supplies and equipment; Former: Vice-President of the Committee on Foreign Policy	
Jurij Lep	Deputy Leader; Member of the Committee on Labour, Family, Social Policy and Disability; Member of the Committee on Education, Science, Sport and Youth; Member of the Committee on Culture; Member of the Commission of Inquiry for detection of abuses and non-economic behavior in the DUTB; Former: Member of the Committee on EU Affairs	
Franc Jurša MP	Leader; Member of the Commission for Public Office and Elections; Member of the Council of the Speaker; Member of the Committee on Defence; Member of the Constitutional Commission; Substitute member of the Commission of Inquiry for investigating the alleged money laundering in NKBM; Substitute member of the Delegation to the NATO Parliamentary Assembly	

=== Slovenian National Party (SNS) ===
MP	Positions	Comments
Lidija Ivanuša	Member of the Committee on Health	
Dušan Šiško	Deputy Leader; Vice-President of the Committee on Infrastructure, Environment and Spatial Planning; Member of the Committee on Education, Science, Sport and Youth; Member of the Committee on the Interior, Public Administration and Local Self-Government; Member of the Commission for Public Office and Elections; Substitute member of the Commission of Inquiry for determining the responsibility of holders of public office in the child cardiology programme and procurement of medical supplies and equipment; Former: Member of the Committee on Defence	
Zmago Jelinčič Plemeniti (MP)	Leader; Vice-President of the Committee on EU Affairs; Vice-President of the Commission for Public Finance Control; Member of the Council of the Speaker; Member of the Committee on Culture; Member of the Committee on Foreign Policy; Member of the Commission for the Supervision of Intelligence and Security Services; Member of the Commission of Inquiry for investigating the alleged money laundering in NKBM; Member of the Commission of Inquiry for detection of abuses and non-economic behavior in the DUTB; Member of the Commission of Inquiry for determining the responsibility of holders of public office in the child cardiology programme and procurement of medical supplies and equipment; Member of the Delegation to the Parliamentary Assembly of the Union for the Mediterranean; Member of the IPU National Group in the National Assembly; Member of the Delegation to the SEECP Parliamentary Assembly; Member of the Delegation of the National Assembly in the Group for Joint Parliamentary Supervision of EUROPOL; Substitute member of the Delegation to the CEI Parliamentary Dimension; Substitute member of the Delegation to the Parliamentary Assembly of the OSCE; President of the Friendship group for the Republic of Kazakhstan; Former: Vice-President of the Committee on Foreign Policy; Member of the Joint Committee; Member of the Committee on EU Affairs	
Jani Ivanuša	Vice-President of the Committee on Agriculture, Forestry and Food; Member of the Committee on Finance; Member of the Committee on the Economy; Member of the Committee on Defence; Substitute member of the Commission of Inquiry for detection of abuses and non-economic behavior in the DUTB; Substitute member of the Commission of Inquiry for investigating the alleged money laundering in NKBM	

=== Elected MPs by electoral districts ===
Constituency	Electoral districts										
Constituency	1	2	3	4	5	6	7	8	9	10	11
1 Kranj	Jesenice	Radovljica I	Radovljica II	Kranj I	Kranj II	Kranj III	Tržič	Škofja Loka I	Škofja Loka II	Kamnik	Idrija
1 Kranj	/	Franc Kramar (SAB)	Karla Urh (LMŠ)	/	Mateja Udovč (SMC)	Branko Grims (SDS)	Edvard Paulič (LMŠ)	Marko Pogačnik (SDS)	Žan Mahnič (SDS)	Matej Tonin (NSi)	Samo Bevk (SD)
1 Kranj	/	Franc Kramar (SAB)	Karla Urh (LMŠ)	/	Mateja Udovč (SMC)	Igor Peček (LMŠ)	Edvard Paulič (LMŠ)	Miha Kordiš (Levica)	Žan Mahnič (SDS)	Matej Tonin (NSi)	Samo Bevk (SD)
2 Postojna	Tolmin	Piran	Izola	Koper I	Koper II	Sežana	Ilirska Bistrica	Postojna	Nova Gorica I	Nova Gorica II	Ajdovščina
2 Postojna	Danijel Krivec (SDS)	Meira Hot (SD)	Branko Simonovič (DeSUS)	Matej Tašner Vatovec (Levica)	/	Marko Bandelli (SAB)	/	Zvonko Černač (SDS)	/	Matjaž Nemec (SD)	Eva Irgl (SDS)
2 Postojna	Danijel Krivec (SDS)	Meira Hot (SD)	Gregor Perič (SMC)	Matej Tašner Vatovec (Levica)	/	Marko Bandelli (SAB)	/	Robert Pavšič (LMŠ)	/	Matjaž Nemec (SD)	Jernej Vrtovec (NSi)
3 Ljubljana Center	Logatec	Vrhnika	Ljubljana Vič-Rudnik I	Ljubljana Vič-Rudnik II	Ljubljana Vič-Rudnik III	Ljubljana Vič-Rudnik IV	Ljubljana Center	Ljubljana Šiška I	Ljubljana Šiška II	Ljubljana Šiška III	Ljubljana Šiška IV
3 Ljubljana Center	Andrej Šircelj (SDS)	Jerca Korče (LMŠ)	Alenka Jeraj (SDS)	Monika Gregorčič (SMC)	/	Anže Logar (SDS)	Violeta Tomić (Levica)	/	Marko Koprivc (SD)	/	Andreja Zabret (LMŠ)
3 Ljubljana Center	Iva Dimic (NSi)	Jerca Korče (LMŠ)	Alenka Jeraj (SDS)	Monika Gregorčič (SMC)	/	Anže Logar (SDS)	Violeta Tomić (Levica)	/	Maša Kociper (SAB)	/	Andreja Zabret (LMŠ)
3 Ljubljana Center	Iva Dimic (NSi)	Jerca Korče (LMŠ)	Alenka Jeraj (SDS)	Monika Gregorčič (SMC)	/	Anže Logar (SDS)	Violeta Tomić (Levica)	/	Jani Möderndorfer (SMC)	/	Andreja Zabret (LMŠ)
4 Ljubljana Bežigrad	Kočevje	Ribnica	Grosuplje	Litija	Ljubljana Moste-Polje I	Ljubljana Moste-Polje II	Ljubljana Moste-Polje III	Ljubljana Bežigrad I	Ljubljana Bežigrad II	Domžale I	Domžale II
4 Ljubljana Bežigrad	Predrag Baković (SD)	Jože Tanko (SDS)	Janez Janša (SDS)	Boris Doblekar (SDS)	/	/	Vojko Starović (SAB)	Dušan Verbič (SMC)	Luka Mesec (Levica)	Tina Heferle (LMŠ)	Brane Golubović (LMŠ)
4 Ljubljana Bežigrad	Predrag Baković (SD)	Jože Tanko (SDS)	Janez Janša (SDS)	Boris Doblekar (SDS)	/	/	Nataša Sukič (Levica)	Dušan Verbič (SMC)	Luka Mesec (Levica)	Tina Heferle (LMŠ)	Tadeja Šuštar (NSi)
5 Celje	Šentjur pri Celju	Celje I	Celje II	Žalec I	Žalec II	Mozirje	Velenje I	Velenje II	Slovenj Gradec	Ravne na Koroškem	Radlje ob Dravi
5 Celje	Jelka Godec (SDS)	/	Željko Cigler (Levica)	/	Aleksander Reberšek (NSi)	Nada Brinovšek (SDS)	/	Franc Rosec (SDS)	Jože Lenart (LMŠ)	Jani Prednik (SD)	/
5 Celje	Lidija Ivanuša (SNS)	/	Željko Cigler (Levica)	/	Aleksander Reberšek (NSi)	Nada Brinovšek (SDS)	/	Franc Rosec (SDS)	Jože Lenart (LMŠ)	Jani Prednik (SD)	/
5 Celje	Robert Polnar (DeSUS)	/	Janja Sluga (SMC)	/	Nik Prebil (LMŠ)	Nada Brinovšek (SDS)	/	Franc Rosec (SDS)	Jože Lenart (LMŠ)	Jani Prednik (SD)	/
6 Novo Mesto	Črnomelj	Novo Mesto I	Novo Mesto II	Trebnje	Brežice	Krško	Sevnica	Laško	Hrastnik	Trbovlje	Zagorje ob Savi
6 Novo Mesto	/	Anja Bah Žibert (SDS)	/	Franci Kepa (SDS)	Igor Zorčič (SMC)	Dušan Šiško (SNS)	Tomaž Lisec (SDS)	Matjaž Han (SD)	Ivan Hršak (DeSUS)	Primož Siter (Levica)	/
6 Novo Mesto	/	Anja Bah Žibert (SDS)	/	Blaž Pavlin (NSi)	Igor Zorčič (SMC)	Dušan Šiško (SNS)	Tomaž Lisec (SDS)	Matjaž Han (SD)	Soniboj Knežak (SD)	Primož Siter (Levica)	/
6 Novo Mesto	/	Anja Bah Žibert (SDS)	/	Blaž Pavlin (NSi)	Igor Zorčič (SMC)	Dušan Šiško (SNS)	Tomaž Lisec (SDS)	Matjaž Han (SD)	Nina Maurovič (LMŠ)	Primož Siter (Levica)	/
7 Maribor	Šmarje pri Jelšah	Slovenska Bistrica	Slovenske Konjice	Ruše	Maribor I	Maribor II	Maribor III	Maribor IV	Maribor V	Maribor VI	Maribor VII
7 Maribor	/	Karmen Furman (SDS)	Bojan Podkrajšek (SDS)	Jurij Lep (DeSUS)	/	/	Dejan Kaloh (SDS)	Franc Trček (Levica)	/	Branislav Rajić (SMC)	Lidija Divjak Mirnik (LMŠ)
7 Maribor	/	Karmen Furman (SDS)	Zmago Jelinčič Plemeniti (SNS)	Bojana Muršič (SD)	/	/	Dejan Kaloh (SDS)	Gregor Židan (SMC)	/	Andrej Rajh (SAB)	Lidija Divjak Mirnik (LMŠ)
8 Ptuj	Lendava	Ormož	Ljutomer	Murska Sobota I	Murska Sobota II	Gornja Radgona	Lenart	Pesnica	Ptuj I	Ptuj II	Ptuj III
8 Ptuj	Jožef Horvat (NSi)	Aljaž Kovačič (LMŠ)	Franc Jurša (DeSUS)	/	Dejan Židan (SD)	/	Franc Breznik (SDS)	Marijan Pojbič (SDS)	Jožef Lenart (SDS)	Boštjan Koražija (Levica)	Suzana Lep Šimenko (SDS)
8 Ptuj	Jožef Horvat (NSi)	Jani Ivanuša (SNS)	Franc Jurša (DeSUS)	/	Dejan Židan (SD)	/	Franc Breznik (SDS)	Marijan Pojbič (SDS)	Jožef Lenart (SDS)	Boštjan Koražija (Levica)	Suzana Lep Šimenko (SDS)
8 Ptuj	Jožef Horvat (NSi)	Mojca Žnidarič (SMC)	Franc Jurša (DeSUS)	/	Dejan Židan (SD)	/	Franc Breznik (SDS)	Marijan Pojbič (SDS)	Jožef Lenart (SDS)	Boštjan Koražija (Levica)	Suzana Lep Šimenko (SDS)

== Representatives of national minorities ==
=== Representative of Italian national minority ===
MP	Positions	Comments
Felice Žiža	Leader; Vice-President of the Commission for the National Communities; Member of the Council of the Speaker; Member of the Committee on Health; Member of the Committee on Culture; Former: Vice-President of the Committee on EU Affairs; Member of the Joint Committee	

=== Representative of Hungarian national minority ===
MP	Positions	Comments
Ferenc Horváth	Deputy Leader; President of the Commission for the National Communities; Member of the Commission for Relations with Slovenes in Neighbouring and Other Countries; Member of the Commission for Public Office and Elections; Member of the Council of the Speaker; Member of the Committee on Foreign Policy; Member of the Committee on Education, Science, Sport and Youth; Member of the Delegation to the Parliamentary Assembly of the OSCE; President of the Friendship group for Hungary	

== Alphabetical list ==
1. Bah Žibert, Anja (SDS)
2. Baković, Predrag (SD)
3. Bandelli, Marko (SAB) - elected Minister without portfolio for Development, Strategic Projects and Cohesion; membership terminated; later resigned as minister and returned to NA
4. Bevk, Samo (SD)
5. Breznik, Franc (SDS) - named State Secretary in the Ministry of the Interior; later resigned and returned to the NA
6. Brglez, Milan (SD, previously SMC) - elected MEP
7. Brinovšek, Nada (SDS)
8. Cerar, Miro (SMC) - elected Minister of Foreign Affairs; later resigned as MP
9. Cigler, Željko (Levica)
10. Černač, Zvonko (SDS) - elected Minister without portfolio for European Cohesion Policy
11. Černigoj, Andrej (NSi) - substitute MP (for Vrtovec)
12. Česnik, Peter Jožef (SAB) - elected Minister without portfolio for Slovenian diaspora; later resigned as MP
13. Dimic, Iva (NSi)
14. Divjak, Mirnik Lidija (LMŠ)
15. Doblekar, Boris (SDS)
16. Ferenčič, Nuša (SDS) - substitute MP (for Breznik); lost mandate after Breznik returned to the NA
17. Ferjan, Jure (SDS) - substitute MP (for Mahnič)
18. Furman, Karmen (SDS)
19. Godec, Jelka (SDS) - named State Secretary in the Office of the Prime Minister
20. Golubović, Brane (LMŠ)
21. Gregorčič, Monika (SMC)
22. Grims, Branko (SDS)
23. Han, Matjaž (SD)
24. Heferle, Tina (LMŠ)
25. Horváth, Ferenc (IMNS)
26. Horvat, Jožef (NSi)
27. Hot, Meira (SD)
28. Hršak, Ivan (DeSUS)
29. Irgl, Eva (SDS)
30. Ivanuša, Jani (SNS)
31. Ivanuša, Lidija (SDS, previously SNS)
32. Janša, Janez (SDS) - elected Prime Minister
33. Jelinčič Plemeniti, Zmago (SNS)
34. Jeraj, Alenka (SDS)
35. Jurša, Franc (DeSUS)
36. Kaloh, Dejan (SDS)
37. Kepa, Franci (SDS)
38. Knežak, Soniboj (SD)
39. Kociper, Maša (SAB) - substitute MP (for Peter Jožef Česnik), Česnik later resigned as MP
40. Koprivc, Marko (SD)
41. Koražija, Boštjan (Levica)
42. Korče, Jerca (LMŠ)
43. Kordiš, Miha (Levica)
44. Kovačič, Aljaž (LMŠ)
45. Krajčič, Darij (LMŠ) - resigned as MP
46. Kramar, Franc (SAB)
47. Krivec, Danijel (SDS)
48. Lenart, Jože (LMŠ)
49. Lenart, Jožef (SDS)
50. Lep, Jurij (DeSUS)
51. Lep Šimenko, Suzana (SDS)
52. Lisec, Tomaž (SDS)
53. Logar, Anže (SDS) - elected Minister of Foreign Affairs
54. Mahnič, Žan (SDS) - named State Secretary in the Office of the Prime Minister
55. Maurovič, Nina (LMŠ) - substitute MP (for Rudi Medved), lost mandate after Medved returned to the NA
56. Medved, Rudi (LMŠ) - elected Minister of Public Administration; later returned to the NA
57. Merjasec, Leon (SDS) - substitute MP (for Šircelj)
58. Mesec, Luka (Levica)
59. Möderndorfer, Jani (LMŠ; previously SMC) - substitute MP (for Miro Cerar); Cerar later resigned as MP
60. Muršič, Bojana (SD)
61. Nemec, Matjaž (SD)
62. Novak, Ljudmila (NSi) - elected MEP
63. Paulič, Edvard (LMŠ)
64. Pavlin, Blaž (NSi)
65. Pavšič, Robert (LMŠ)
66. Peček, Igor (LMŠ)
67. Perič, Gregor (SMC)
68. Počivalšek, Zdravko (SMC) - elected Minister of Economic Development and Technology; membership terminated
69. Podkrajšek, Bojan (SDS)
70. Pogačnik, Marko (SDS)
71. Pojbič, Marijan (SDS)
72. Polnar, Robert (DeSUS)
73. Prebil, Nik (LMŠ) - replaced Krajčič
74. Prednik, Jani (SD)
75. Prevc, Mihael (NSi) - substitute MP (for Tonin)
76. Rajh, Andrej (SAB)
77. Rajić, Branislav (SMC)
78. Reberšek, Aleksander (NSi)
79. Rosec, Franc (SDS)
80. Simonovič, Branko (DeSUS)
81. Siter, Primož (Levica)
82. Sluga, Janja (SMC)
83. Starović, Vojko (SAB)
84. Sukič, Nataša (Levica)
85. Šarec, Marjan (LMŠ) - elected Prime Minister; later returned to the NA
86. Šircelj, Andrej (SDS) - elected Minister of Finance
87. Šiško, Dušan (SNS)
88. Škrinjar, Mojca (SDS) - substitute MP (for Logar)
89. Šušmelj, Andrej (SAB) - substitute MP (for Marko Bandelli); lost mandate after Bandelli returned to the NA
90. Šuštar, Tadeja (NSi) - replaced Novak
91. Tanko, Jože (SDS)
92. Tašner Vatovec, Matej (Levica)
93. Tomić, Violeta (Levica)
94. Tonin, Matej (NSi) - elected Minister of Defence
95. Trček, Franc (SD; previously Levica)
96. Udovč, Mateja (SMC)
97. Urh, Karla (LMŠ) - substitute MP (for Marjan Šarec); lost mandate after Šarec returned to the NA
98. Verbič, Dušan (SMC) - replaced Brglez
99. Vrtovec, Jernej (NSi) - elected Minister of Infrastructure
100. Zabret, Andreja (LMŠ)
101. Zavadlav Ušaj, Elena (SDS) - substitute MP (for Černač)
102. Zorčič, Igor (SMC)
103. Židan, Dejan (SD)
104. Židan, Gregor (SD; previously SMC) - substitute MP (for Zdravko Počivalšek)
105. Žiža, Felice (IMNS)
106. Žnidar, Ljubo (SDS) - substitute MP (for Godec)
107. Žnidarič, Mojca (SMC)
