= Commission for Public Office and Elections of the National Assembly of the Republic of Slovenia =

Commission for Public Office and Elections is one of the standing commissions of the National Assembly.

It is always the first body names, since it has to confirm mandates of the elected MPs during the first session of the Assembly.

== Responsibilities ==
Commission:

- confirms mandates of the MPs
- discusses issues relating to the immunity of deputies, judges of the Constitutional Court, judges and the Ombudsman and his deputies,
- informs the Assembly of cases which result in the termination of the MP's mandate,
- discusses draft laws and other regulations governing the status and rights of Members and the Secretary-General,
- address the issues regarding election, appointment and dismissal, when required by law,
- propose to the National Assembly in the appointment or election of officers,
- giving consent to the appointment of officers,
- adopts acts on salaries and other remuneration and reimbursement and leave Members and the Secretary-General.

== Current members in the 8th National Assembly ==
Member
Jože Tanko (SDS)	President
Marko Bandelli (SAB)	Vice-president
Franc Breznik (SDS)	Member
Jelka Godec (SDS)	Member
Alenka Jeraj (SDS)	Member
Danijel Krivec (SDS)	Member
Tina Heferle (LMŠ)	Member
Lidija Divjak Mirnik (LMŠ)	Member
Rudi Medved (LMŠ)	Member
Matjaž Han (SD)	Member
Bojana Muršič (SD)	Member
Janja Sluga (SMC)	Member
Igor Zorčič (SMC)	Member
Luka Mesec (Levica)	Member
Matej Tašner Vatovec (Levica)	Member
Jožef Horvat (NSi)	Member
Franc Jurša (DeSUS)	Member
Dušan Šiško (SNS)	Member
Ferenc Horváth (IMNS)	Member
