= Marko Bandelli =

Slovenian politician and businessman (born 1967)

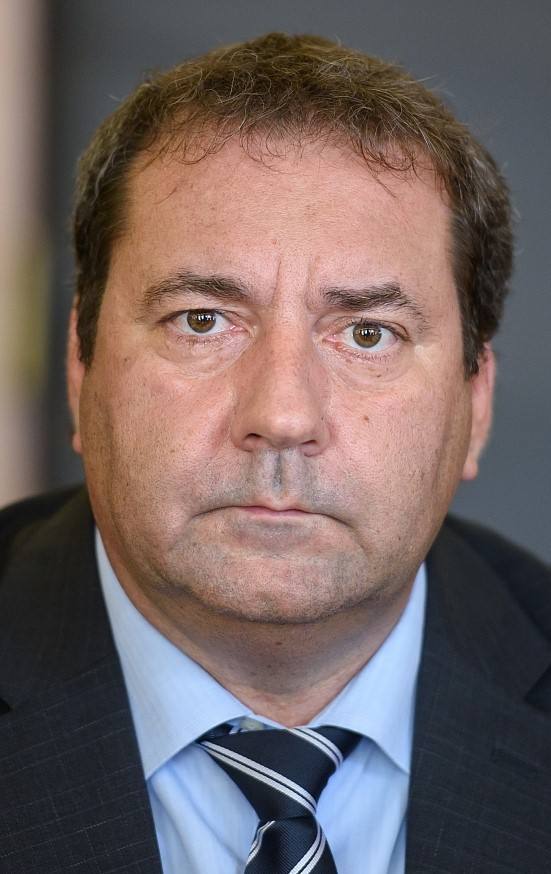

Minister for Development, Strategic Projects and Cohesion
- In office 13 September 2018 – 13 November 2018
- Prime Minister: Marjan Šarec
- Preceded by: Alenka Smerkolj
- Succeeded by: Iztok Purič

Mayor of the Municipality of Komen
- In office 2014–2018
- Preceded by: Danijel Božič
- Succeeded by: Erik Modic

Personal details
- Born: 19 November 1967 (age 58) Trieste, Italy
- Party: Positive Slovenia (2011–2014); Party of Alenka Bratušek (2014–2022); Freedom Movement (2022–2023); DeSUS (2023–2025); Party of Generations (since 2025)
- Education: Žiga Zois Higher School, Trieste

Marko Bandelli (born 19 November 1967) is a Slovenian businessman and politician.

Bandelli is a businessman from the Littoral region. From 2014 to 2018, he served as mayor of the Municipality of Komen. Following the formation of the 13th Government of Slovenia, he became Minister for Development, Strategic Projects and Cohesion, but resigned due to verbal pressure directed at a mayoral candidate in Komen. Until 2022, he served as a member of the National Assembly representing the Alenka Bratušek Party. After the party merged with the Freedom Movement, he left the party and joined DeSUS.

== Early life and business career ==
Marko Bandelli was born as Marco Bandelli on 19 November 1967 in Trieste, Italy, to father Alojz Bandelj, a businessman, and a mother who worked as a nurse. His father changed his name to Luigi Bandelli after acquiring Italian citizenship. Bandelli Slovenised his first name from Marco to Marko in 1990, while retaining the Italianised surname.

He completed primary and secondary education in Nabrežina (Aurisina), Italy, and graduated in 1988 from the Žiga Zois Higher School in Trieste. He founded his first company at the age of 22 and later managed several companies, including EDILTER s.n.c., KBA d.o.o., EUMAT d.o.o., and Bandelli Group d.o.o. He resumed his studies in 2010 and graduated in economics in 2013.

== Political career ==
In 2011, Bandelli joined Positive Slovenia, the party led by Zoran Janković. In 2013, he established its local branch in Komen. That same year, he was appointed a member of the supervisory board of RTV Slovenia and later became its chairman.

During the split in Positive Slovenia, he sided with Alenka Bratušek and co-founded her party, the Party of Alenka Bratušek. In 2014, he ran for mayor of Komen and won the election in the second round with 51.33% of the vote.

In the 2018 Slovenian parliamentary election, he was elected to the National Assembly. He served on several parliamentary committees, including those dealing with finance, culture, defence, and relations with Slovenians abroad.

On 13 September 2018, he was appointed Minister for Development, Strategic Projects and Cohesion. Following controversy over alleged verbal threats toward a local candidate, Prime Minister Marjan Šarec demanded his resignation, which took effect on 13 November 2018. He was succeeded by Iztok Purič.

After the 2022 Slovenian parliamentary election, his party merged into the Freedom Movement. In January 2023, Bandelli left the party, citing internal disagreements, and joined the DeSUS. In June 2024, he was elected vice-president of the party.

In the 2026 Slovenian parliamentary election Bandelli endorsed the Democrats, as of now it is unclear whether he also joined the party.

== Personal life ==
Bandelli lives with his wife and children in Kobdilj, Slovenia. He is fluent in Slovene and Italian.

== See also ==
- Politics of Slovenia
- Alenka Bratušek
