= 2026 in Bosnia and Herzegovina =

- Decades: 2000s; 2010s; 2020s
- See also: Other events of 2026; Timeline of Bosnian and Herzegovinian history

This is an article for events in the year 2026 in Bosnia and Herzegovina.

== Incumbents ==
- Presidency of Bosnia and Herzegovina:
    - Denis Bećirović
    - Željka Cvijanović
    - Željko Komšić
- Chairwoman of the Council of Ministers: Borjana Krišto

== Events ==
=== January ===
- 5 January – One person is killed by a falling tree brought about by heavy snowfall following a winter storm in Sarajevo.
- 26 January – A coordinated blockade is held by truck drivers in border crossings nationwide in protest over the implementation of the Entry/Exit System by the European Union.

=== February ===
- 12 February – A tram derails in Sarajevo, killing one person and injuring four others.
- 15 February – Nihad Uk resigns as Prime Minister of Sarajevo Canton amid protests over the government's handling of the 2026 Sarajevo tram derailment.

=== March ===
- 30 March – Bosnia and Herzegovina qualifies for the 2026 FIFA World Cup after defeating Italy 4-1 on penalties at the 2026 FIFA World Cup qualification in Zenica.

=== April ===
- 28 April – Croatia and Bosnia-Herzegovina sign an agreement to build the Southern Interconnection gas pipeline connecting Bosnia with the LNG terminal in Krk.

=== May ===
- 11 May – Christian Schmidt announces his resignation as High Representative for Bosnia and Herzegovina, but will stay in office until his replacement is found.

=== June ===
- 11 June–19 July – Bosnia and Herzegovina participates at the participates at the 2026 FIFA World Cup.

=== August ===
- 14–21 August – 32nd Sarajevo Film Festival

=== October ===
- 4 October –
  - 2026 Bosnian general election
  - 2026 Federation of Bosnia and Herzegovina general election
  - 2026 Republika Srpska general election
- 29 October – A Boeing CH-47 Chinook operated by the Italian Army crashes during routine training as part of Operation Althea in Gorice, Brčko. Four of the 15 people onboard are killed while the remaining 11 are injured.

== Art and entertainment ==
- List of Bosnian submissions for the Academy Award for Best International Feature Film
- 32nd Sarajevo Film Festival

== Holidays ==
- 1–2 January – New Year's Day
- 6 January – Orthodox Christmas Eve (RS)
- 7 January – Orthodox Christmas (RS)
- 9 January – Republic Day (RS)
- 14 January – New Year's Day (RS)
- 1 March – Independence Day (FBiH)
- 20 March – Ramadan Bajram (FBiH)
- 5 April – Catholic Easter (FBiH)
- 6 April – Catholic Easter Monday (FBiH)
- 10 April – Orthodox Good Friday (RS)
- 12 April – Orthodox Easter (RS)
- 13 April – Orthodox Easter Monday (RS)
- 1–2 May – Labour Day
- 9 May – Victory Day (RS)
- 27 May – Kurban Bajram (FBiH)
- 28 June – Saint Vitus Day (RS)
- 1 November – All Saints' Day (FBiH)
- 21 November – Dayton Agreement Day (RS)
- 25 November – Statehood Day (FBiH)
- 25 December – Catholic Christmas (FBiH)

== Deaths ==
- 2 January – Vladimir Lukić, 92, prime minister of Republika Srpska (1993–1994)
- 19 January – Mladen Bartolović, 48, football player (Cibalia, NK Zagreb, national team) and manager
- 18 February – Borislav Paravac, 83, Serb member (2003–2006) and chairman (2003, 2004–2005) of the Presidency
- 30 March – Carlos Westendorp, 89, Spanish diplomat, high representative for Bosnia and Herzegovina (1997–1999).
- 5 April – Rusmir Mahmutćehajić, 77, writer, deputy prime minister (1991–1992).
- 6 April – Christian Schwarz-Schilling, 96, German politician, high representative for Bosnia and Herzegovina (2006–2007).
- 6 May – Rajko Kasagić, 83, prime minister of Republika Srpska (1995–1996).
- 27 August – Ratko Mladić, 84, military officer and convicted war criminal (Bosnian genocide, siege of Sarajevo), commander of the Army of Republika Srpska (1992–1996).
- 2 September – Raif Dizdarević, 99, president of the Presidency of Yugoslavia (1988–1989), minister of foreign affairs (1984–1987), and chairman of the Presidency of Bosnia and Herzegovina (1978–1982).
- 1 October – Biljana Plavšić, 96, convicted war criminal (Bosnian War), president (1996–1998) and vice president (1992–1996) of Republika Srpska.
- 6 October – Bisera Alikadić, 87, poet and author.
- 23 October – Asim Kurjak, 85, physician.
