= 2026 in Slovenia =

- Decades: 2000s; 2010s; 2020s
- See also: Other events of 2026; Timeline of Slovenian history

Events in the year 2026 in Slovenia.

== Incumbents ==
- President: Nataša Pirc Musar
- Prime Minister: Robert Golob (until 22 May); Janez Janša (since 22 May)
- Speaker of the National Assembly: Urška Klakočar Zupančič (until 10 April); Zoran Stevanović (since 10 April)

== Events ==
=== January ===
- 18 January–8 February – UEFA Futsal Euro 2026 in Latvia, Lithuania and Slovenia.

=== March ===
- 20 March – The second tube of the Karawanks motorway Tunnel is opened, with traffic redirected to this tube for renovations of the first tube.
- 22 March – 2026 Slovenian parliamentary election.

=== April ===
- 23 April – Radiotelevizija Slovenija announces that it will not broadcast the Eurovision Song Contest 2026 as part of the country's boycott of the show over Israeli participation.

=== May ===
- 13 May – The Directorate for War Veterans and Military Heritage of Slovenia repatriates the remains of around 500 Croatian victims of World War II and the post-war period exhumed from 2013 to 2017 from five locations nationwide (Košnica pri Celju, Trebče, Podstenice/Rugarski klanc and Cerklje ob Krki) at a ceremony in Maribor.
- 22 May – Janez Janša is confirmed as prime minister by parliament.

=== June ===
- 4 June – Janez Janša's government is confirmed by parliament.
- 11 June – The new government lifts sanctions imposed on Israeli prime minister Benjamin Netanyahu and other related measures against Israel by the previous administration in response to the Gaza war.

=== November ===
- 14 November – Slovenia signs the instruments of accession to the Treaty of Amity and Cooperation in Southeast Asia by ASEAN.
- 15 November – 2026 Slovenian local elections (first round)

=== Scheduled ===
- 29 November – 2026 Slovenian local elections (second round)

== Holidays ==
- 1 January – New Year's Day
- 2 January – New Year's Holiday
- 8 February – Prešeren Day
- 5 April – Easter Sunday
- 6 April – Easter Monday
- 27 April – Resistance Day
- 1 May – May Day
- 2 May – May Day Holiday
- 24 May – Whit Sunday
- 25 June – National Day
- 15 August – Assumption Day
- 31 October – Reformation Day
- 1 November – All Saints' Day
- 25 December – Christmas Day
- 26 December – Independence and Unity Day

== Deaths ==
- 31 January – Nataša Bokal, 58, Olympic skier (1992, 1998, 2002).
- 6 February – Bruno Parma, 84, chess grandmaster.
- 19 February – Boris Frlec, 90, politician, minister of foreign affairs (1997–2000).
- 10 March – Alojz Ihan, 64, immunologist and author.
- 16 April – Ivan Rebernik, 86, diplomat, chancellor of the Order of the Holy Sepulchre (2012–2016).
- 24 June – Tullio Možina, 91, Italian-born guitarist and singer.
- 10 August – Slavko Pregl, 80, writer, editor and publisher.
- 15 August – Milena Zupančič, 79, actress.
- 2 October — Karel Zelenko, 101, graphic artist and illustrator.

== See also ==
- 2026 in the European Union
- 2026 in Europe
