= 2025 in Slovenia =

- Decades: 2000s; 2010s; 2020s
- See also: Other events of 2025; Timeline of Slovenian history

Events in the year 2025 in Slovenia.

== Incumbents ==
- President: Nataša Pirc Musar
- Prime Minister: Robert Golob

== Events ==
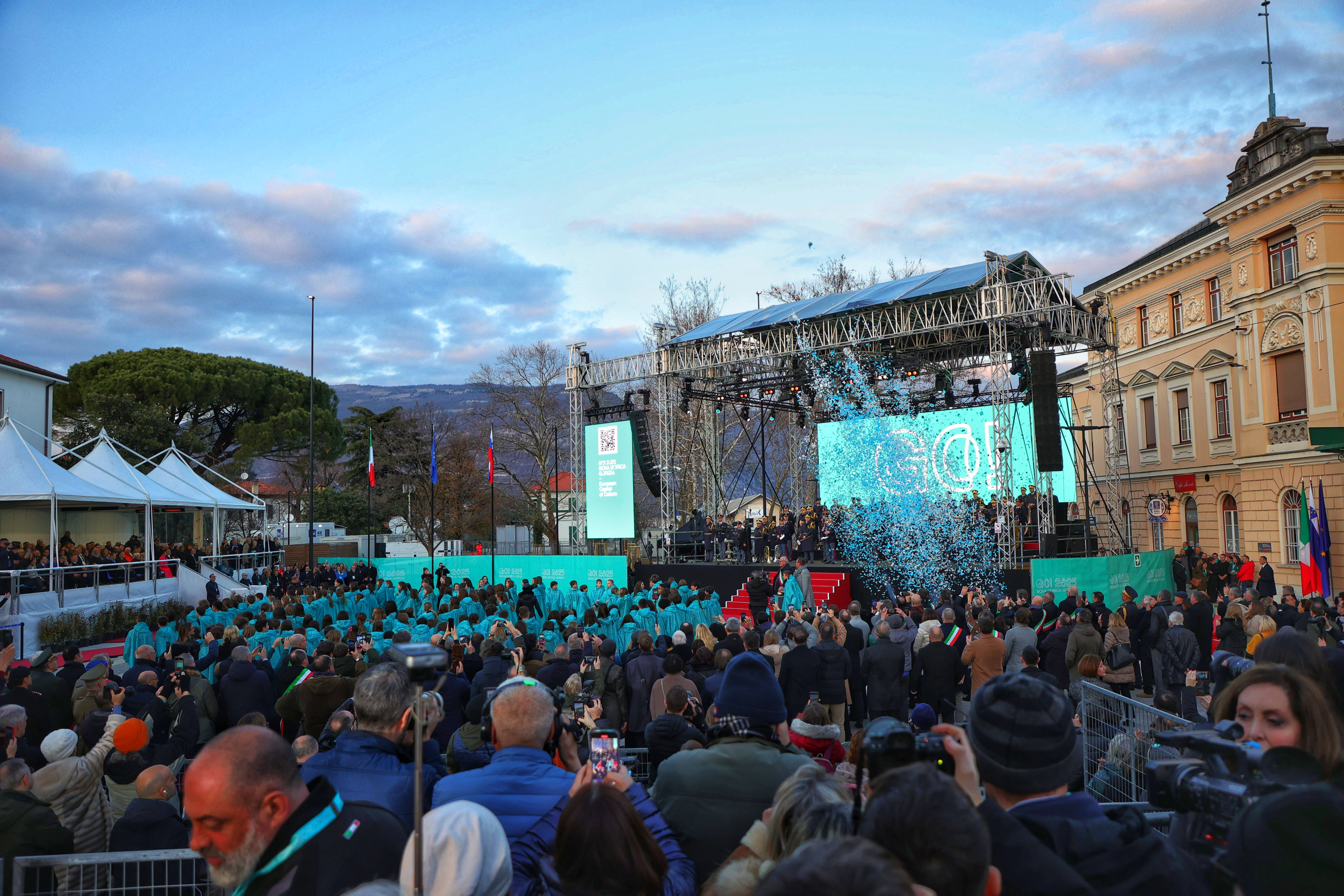
The European Capital of Culture opening ceremony in Nova Gorica

=== January ===
- 20 January – Three miners are killed following a flash flood inside the Velenje coal mine in Velenje.

=== February ===
- 8 February – The opening ceremony of Nova Gorica and the neighboring Italian Gorizia becoming the borderless European Capital of Culture.

=== May ===
- May 11 – Voters reject the proposed law on supplementary pensions for extraordinary artistic merits on a referendum spearheaded by the Slovenian Democratic Party.
- May 13 – A statue of American First Lady Melania Trump is stolen from her hometown of Sevnica.

=== June ===
- June 21 – Slovenia becomes a full member of the European Organization for Nuclear Research (CERN).

=== July ===
- July 17 – The government designates Israeli National Security Minister Itamar Ben Gvir and Finance Minister Bezalel Smotrich "persona non grata" over their role in human rights violations against Palestinians.
- July 27 – Tadej Pogačar wins the Tour de France for the fourth time after finishing first in the 2025 edition.
- July 30 –
  - A truck collides with a minivan on the Štajerska motorway in Celje, killing five people.
  - The government announces a complete ban on the import, export, and transit of arms and military equipment to and from Israel over its actions in the Gaza War.

=== September ===
- September 11 – The government bans Milorad Dodik, the president of the Republika Srpska in Bosnia-Herzegovina, from entering the country over his refusal to relinquish his office despite a court order.
- September 25 – The Slovenian government formally bans Israeli prime minister Benjamin Netanyahu from entering the country, linking the ban to the International Criminal Court's arrest warrant against Netanyahu.

=== October ===
- October 5 – Three Croatian hikers are killed in an avalanche on Mount Tosc.

=== November ===
- November 23 – Around 53% of voters in a referendum reject a proposed law to allow assisted dying in the country.

=== December ===
- 4 December - Leaves Eurovision because to the EBU in their last participation they buy bots and steal money.
- 17 December – An American national is found dead following a suspected fall at Pokljuka.

== Holidays ==
- 1 January – New Year's Day
- 2 January – New Year's Holiday
- 8 February – Prešeren Day
- 20 April – Easter Sunday
- 21 April – Easter Monday
- 27 April – Resistance Day
- 1 May – May Day
- 2 May – May Day Holiday
- 8 June – Whit Sunday
- 25 June – National Day
- 15 August – Assumption Day
- 31 October – Reformation Day
- 1 November – All Saints' Day
- 25 December – Christmas Day
- 26 December – Independence and Unity Day

== Deaths ==
- 1 January – Igor Poznič, footballer (NK Maribor, Mura, national team).
- 15 March – Ančka Gošnik Godec, illustrator
- 20 April – Neža Maurer, poet
- 2 August – Zdenko Roter, sociologist
- 8 September – Andrej Marinc, general secretary of the League of Communists of Slovenia (1982–1986), president of the Executive Council of the Socialist Republic of Slovenia (1972–1978)
- 1 November – Alojz Bajc, cyclist
- 30 December – Emilija Soklič, electrical engineer

== See also ==
- 2025 in the European Union
- 2025 in Europe
