= 2027 in Bosnia and Herzegovina =

- Decades: 2000s; 2010s; 2020s
- See also: Other events of 2027; Timeline of Bosnian and Herzegovinian history

This is an article for events in the year 2027 in Bosnia and Herzegovina.

== Events ==
=== Predicted and scheduled ===
- 2 August – Solar eclipse of August 2, 2027 (partial eclipse)

== Holidays ==
- 1–2 January – New Year's Day
- 6 January – Orthodox Christmas Eve (RS)
- 7 January – Orthodox Christmas (RS)
- 9 January – Republic Day (RS)
- 14 January – New Year's Day (RS)
- 1 March – Independence Day (FBiH)
- 9 March – Ramadan Bajram (FBiH)
- 28 March – Catholic Easter (FBiH)
- 29 March – Catholic Easter Monday (FBiH)
- 30 April – Orthodox Good Friday (RS)
- 1 May – Labour Day
- 2 May – Orthodox Easter (RS)
- 3 May –
  - Orthodox Easter Monday (RS)
  - Labour Day Holiday
- 9 May – Victory Day (RS)
- 17 May – Kurban Bajram (FBiH)
- 28 June – Saint Vitus Day (RS)
- 1 November – All Saints' Day (FBiH)
- 21 November – Dayton Agreement Day (RS)
- 25 November – Statehood Day (FBiH)
- 25 December – Catholic Christmas (FBiH)
