= 2027 in Slovenia =

- Decades: 2000s; 2010s; 2020s
- See also: Other events of 2027; Timeline of Slovenian history

Events in the year 2027 in Slovenia.

== Events ==
=== Predicted and scheduled ===
- By October – 2027 Slovenian presidential election

== Holidays ==
- 1 January – New Year's Day
- 2 January – New Year's Holiday
- 8 February – Prešeren Day
- 28 March – Easter Sunday
- 29 March – Easter Monday
- 27 April – Resistance Day
- 1 May – May Day
- 2 May – May Day Holiday
- 16 May – Whit Sunday
- 25 June – National Day
- 15 August – Assumption Day
- 31 October – Reformation Day
- 1 November – All Saints' Day
- 25 December – Christmas Day
- 26 December – Independence and Unity Day

== See also ==
- 2027 in the European Union
- 2027 in Europe
