= Dan državnosti =

Dan državnosti (Serbo-Croatian for Statehood Day) may refer to:

- Statehood Day (Bosnia and Herzegovina)
- Statehood Day (Croatia)
- Statehood Day (Montenegro)
- Statehood Day (North Macedonia)
- Statehood Day (Slovenia)
- Statehood Day (Serbia)
