= 2025 in Bosnia and Herzegovina =

- Decades: 2000s; 2010s; 2020s
- See also: Other events of 2025; Timeline of Bosnian and Herzegovinian history

This is an article for events in the year 2025 in Bosnia and Herzegovina.

== Incumbents ==
- Presidency of Bosnia and Herzegovina:
    - Denis Bećirović
    - Željka Cvijanović
    - Željko Komšić
- Chairwoman of the Council of Ministers: Borjana Krišto

== Events ==
=== February ===
- 26 February –
  - A court in Sarajevo convicts Milorad Dodik, the President of Republika Srpska, for disobeying the High Representative for Bosnia and Herzegovina and sentences him to one year imprisonment and a ban on engaging in political activities for six years.
  - Three people are arrested on suspicion of child trafficking following the discovery of 31 minors inside a house in Brčko.
- 28 February – The National Assembly of Republika Srpska votes to reject the authority of federal prosecutors and courts as well as the Intelligence-Security Agency of Bosnia and Herzegovina in Republika Srpska.

=== March ===
- 17 March – The Court of Bosnia and Herzegovina issues arrest warrants against Milorad Dodik, Republika Srpska Prime Minister Radovan Višković and Republika Srpska National Assembly Speaker Nenad Stevandić for anti-constitutional conduct regarding Dodik's refusal to serve his imprisonment.

=== April ===
- 23 April – Agents from the Bosnian State Investigation and Protection Agency attempt to arrest Milorad Dodik, the President of Republika Srpska at an office east of Sarajevo but are prevented by the Police of Republika Srpska.

=== May ===
- 26 May – Six people are injured in a shootout between rival migrant trafficking groups near an asylum camp in Blazuj.

=== July ===
- 4 July – The Court of Bosnia and Herzegovina lifts the arrest warrant against Milorad Dodik after he agrees to be questioned by prosecutors over allegations of secessionism.

=== August ===
- 3 August 2024 – 25 May 2025: 2024–25 Premier League of Bosnia and Herzegovina
- 6 August – The Central Election Commission of Bosnia and Herzegovina removes Milorad Dodik as president of Republika Srpska after an appeals court affirms his conviction in February.

=== September ===
- 3 September – FIFA issues a CHF21,000 ($26,000)-fine on the Football Association of Bosnia and Herzegovina over inappropriate behavior by fans during a 2026 FIFA World Cup qualification match between the national team and San Marino in June.
- 11 September – Slovenia issues an entry ban on Milorad Dodik over his refusal to step down as the president of Republika Srpska.

=== October ===
- 18 October – Ana Trišić-Babić is appointed as interim president of Republika Srpska by the entity's National Assembly.
- 25 October – 2025 Republika Srpska referendum
- 29 October – The United States lifts sanctions against Milorad Dodik that it imposed in 2022.

=== November ===
- 4 November
  - 2025 Tuzla retirement home fire– A fire at a home for the elderly in Tuzla kills 18 people and injures 35 others.
  - The Constitutional Court of Bosnia and Herzegovina confirms Milorad Dodik's six-year ban from political office, rejecting Dodik's appeals and ruling that the ban did not violate the constitution.
- 23 November – 2025 Republika Srpska presidential election: Siniša Karan of the ruling SNSD is elected president with 50.89% of the vote.

== Holidays ==
- 1-2 January – New Year's Day
- 6 January – Orthodox Christmas Eve (RS)
- 7 January – Orthodox Christmas (RS)
- 9 January – Republic Day (RS)
- 14 January – New Year's Day (RS)
- 1 March – Independence Day (FBiH)
- 31 March – Catholic Easter (FBiH)
- 1 April – Catholic Easter Monday (FBiH)
- 10 April – Ramadan Bajram (FBiH)
- 1-2 May – Labour Day
- 3 May – Orthodox Good Friday (RS)
- 5 May – Orthodox Easter (RS)
- 6 May – Orthodox Easter Monday (RS)
- 9 May – Victory Day (RS)
- 16 June – Kurban Bajram (FBiH)
- 28 June – Saint Vitus Day (RS)
- 1 November – All Saints' Day (FBiH)
- 21 November – Dayton Agreement Day (RS)
- 25 November – Statehood Day (FBiH)
- 25 December – Catholic Christmas (FBiH)

2025 was also celebrated as the 1100th Anniversary of the Croatian Kingdom in Bosnia and Herzegovina.

== Art and entertainment ==
- List of Bosnian submissions for the Academy Award for Best International Feature Film
- 31st Sarajevo Film Festival

== Deaths ==
- 22 March – Svetlana Broz, author and physician.
- 7 October – Halid Bešlić, singer and musician.
- 3 November – Mladen Žižović, footballer and football manager.
- 18 December – Slavko Aleksić, Chetnik paramilitary commander.
