= Alikadić =

Alikadić is a Bosnian surname, derived from Turkish Ali Kadı. Notable people with the surname include:

- Amar Alikadić (born 1998), Bosnian footballer
- Bisera Alikadić (born 1939), Bosnian poet and writer
- Salko Alikadić (1896–1941), NDH general
