= 2022 in Bosnia and Herzegovina =

- Decades: 2000s; 2010s; 2020s
- See also: Other events of 2022; Timeline of Bosnian and Herzegovinian history

Events in the year 2022 in Bosnia and Herzegovina.

== Incumbents ==
- Presidency of Bosnia and Herzegovina:
    - Milorad Dodik
    - Šefik Džaferović
    - Željko Komšić (until 16 November)
    - Denis Bećirović
    - Željka Cvijanović
    - Željko Komšić onwards
- Chairman of the Council of Ministers: Zoran Tegeltija

== Events ==
Ongoing – COVID-19 pandemic in Bosnia and Herzegovina

=== February ===
- 25 February – Protesters gather in Sarajevo, to stand in solidarity with Ukraine.

=== April ===
- 22 April – 2022 Bosnia and Herzegovina earthquake: One person killed and 14 injured.

=== May ===
- 25 May – Several bomb threats are made via email to schools and government institutions in Sarajevo Canton, Bosnia and Herzegovina, prompting evacuations. No bombs have been found.

=== July ===
- 3 July – Bosnia and Herzegovina reports its first confirmed case of monkeypox.

=== August ===
- 6 August – Twelve people are killed and 32 others are injured when a bus carrying pilgrims from Poland to Medjugorje, Bosnia and Herzegovina, crashes in Podvorec, Croatia.

=== October ===
- 2 October – 2022 Bosnian general election: Bosnians elect the three members of their ethnically shared government. The Party of Democratic Action emerged as the largest party in the House of Representatives, winning 9 of the 42 seats.

=== November ===
- 16 November – Denis Bećirović, Željka Cvijanović, Željko Komšić assume their roles as the Presidency of Bosnia and Herzegovina.

=== December ===
- 13 December – The European affairs ministers of the European Union agree to upgrade Bosnia and Herzegovina's application status, formally recognising the country's candidacy to join the union. The European Council will officially grant this status on 15 December.
- 15 December – Accession of Bosnia and Herzegovina to the European Union: The European Council formally grants candidate status to Bosnia and Herzegovina.

== Deaths ==
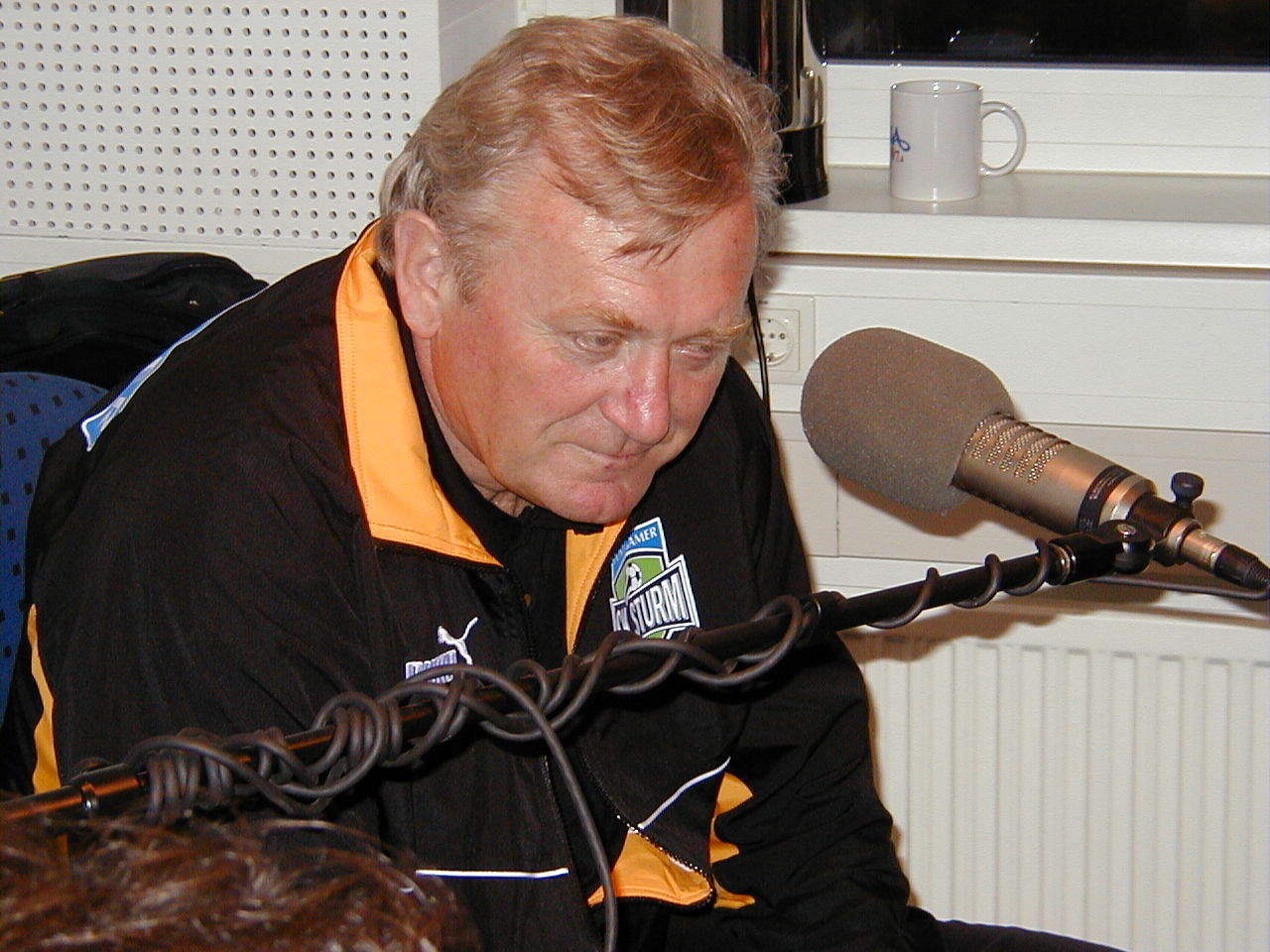
Ivica Osim

=== May ===
- 1 May – Ivica Osim, professional football manager and player (b. 1941).
- 5 June – Paša Gackić, soprano, opera soloist and music pedagogue (b. 1947).
