= Referendums in Republika Srpska =

Several referendums have been held in Republika Srpska during its existence, whilst others have been proposed but not happened.

== History ==
Although Republika Srpska was not proclaimed until January 1992, a referendum on remaining part of Yugoslavia was held amongst Bosnian Serbs in November 1991, with 98% voting in favour of the proposal, resulting in the establishment of the territory in 1992.

Two further referendums were held in the midst of the Bosnian War; a referendum on the Vance-Owen peace plan was held in May 1993 and rejected by 96% of voters. In August 1994 a referendum was held on the Contact Group plan and rejected by 97% of voters, with the vote denounced by the Contact Group.

== Proposed referendums ==
=== 2011 referendum on the authority of the state judicial system ===
Ideas about a referendum in the RS were first ventilated by Milorad Dodik during his premiership period in 2006-2008, rekindled after Montenegro's 2006 independence referendum and Kosovo's 2008 unilateral declaration of independence.

In April 2011 a formal proposal for a referendum was submitted to the RS Assembly, which voted for it and scheduled it for mid-June 2011. The debate on the vote was remarked as confusing, as the matter at stake was unclear: whether independence, opposition to the "imposed decisions" of the High Representative, or (as finally stated) merely the functioning of prosecution offices and courts at central level.

International reactions varied. High Representative Valentin Inzko openly confronted Milorad Dodik over the decision on the referendum, giving him seven days to withdraw the referendum decision, and announcing readiness to use its executive powers to annul the decision and impose sanctions on the RS leaders, up until dismissing Dodik from his post, should the referendum (deemed a violation of the Dayton legal order) proceed. In response, the RS leadership threatened to withdraw all Serb representative from BiH institutions, including the Presidency and Council of Ministers, the Parliament and the judiciary. The decision about calling the referendum did not gather as much support as expected from kin-state Serbia, with President Boris Tadic unwilling to "interfere" in Bosnia's internal affairs, while expressing opposition to OHR's plans and calling for a solution of the crisis through compromise. The debate on the issue at the UN Security Council on 9 May 2011 did not produce a common stance due to the disagreement of Russia with Inzko's position, and the reserves of China. Meanwhile, a publication of the influential think-tank International Crisis Group recommended a more moderate approach and deemed counterproductive to proceed confrontationally against Dodik. Finally, the issue was solved after a meeting between the RS President and the EU High Representative for Common Foreign and Security Policy, Catherine Ashton, in which Dodik agreed to withdraw the referendum in exchange for a "Structured Dialogue on Justice" among Bosnian institutions and the EU in which to discuss the substantial grievances of the RS authorities towards the BiH judiciary. While the EU intervention allowed to avert the crisis and revert the situation to the status quo in early April, the threat of a RS referendum remained in the background, as Dodik never withdrawn the legal acts concerning it.

=== 2016 referendum on the authority of the BiH State Court ===
A referendum on the authority of the National Court was called for in Republika Srpska and originally planned to be held on 15 November 2015. After legal challenges and postponements, it was indefinitely postponed as of February 2016.

The referendum was announced by surprise, after a period of tensions between the RS authorities and the state judicial institutions linked to the extradition case of the former Bosnian Army commander of Srebrenica, Naser Oric. Oric had been arrested in Switzerland on 10 June 2015 upon an arrest warrant from Serbia. Yet, Swiss authorities extradited him to Bosnia following the request of the authorities of its state of citizenship, who said Bosnia's state prosecution had a case against him. Oric was released soon after. At the same time, the UK had proposed a UN resolution on Srebrenica to the Security Council, which would be later vetoed by Russia following Serbia's request.

The referendum was proposed by RS President Milorad Dodik, who claimed that the State Court was biased against Bosnian Serbs and that the state judicial institutions worked against the interests of RS, despite costing the Entity a big amount of money annually. A vote on holding the referendum was subsequently held in the National Assembly; 45 voted in favour, 31 abstained and the remaining seven MPs were absent.

Voters would be asked whether the State Court of Bosnia and Herzegovina should have authority over residents of Republika Srpska. The referendum question read:

"Do you support the unconstitutional and illegal imposition of laws by the High Representative of the international community and in particular the imposed law on the Court and the Prosecutor's Office of Bosnia and Herzegovina and the implementation of their decisions in the territory of Republika Srpska?"

An SNSD amendment adopted contextually established that the referendum would be held on the first Sunday after the expiry of 50 days from the date of entry into force of the decision on the referendum. The decision is set to enter into force on the eighth day after its publication in the Official Gazette of the RS. Given these conditions, the original date for the consultation was set for 15 November 2015.

==== Reactions ====
The decision was met with opposition from domestic and international actors alike.

- The RS opposition parties (members of the state-level government coalition) convened that state judicial institutions were not working satisfactorily, but opposed "Dodik and the RS authorities' manipulation of citizens by means of a referendum", hence abstaining on the final vote, and expressed confidence that - as the one announced in 2011 - the referendum would never be held. RS MP Vukota Govedarica reminded that Milorad Dodik had taken part personally in the adoption of laws establishing the state judicial institutions which he know was looking forward to dismantle. Bosnian Serb BiH Presidency member Mladen Ivanic said that Republika Srpska “has a right to hold a referendum” but that this was “not the happiest solution” to problems with the state-level judiciary.
- The High Representative for Bosnia and Herzegovina and the Constitutional Court of Bosnia and Herzegovina claimed that the vote would have constituted a violation of the Dayton Agreement. However, the Constitutional Court of Republika Srpska approved the holding of the referendum.
- The Peace Implementation Council (PIC), the international body tasked with supervising the implementation of the Dayton Peace Agreement, said the announced referendum would represent a fundamental violation of the 1995 peace deal.
- The EU Ambassador, Lars-Gunnar Wigemark, together with diplomats from the US, the UK, France, Germany and Italy traveled to Banja Luka on Monday to emphasize their shared opposition to the vote, deemed an intolerable and "unconstitutional attempt not to reform but to undermine and weaken those authorities, and would thus pose a direct threat to the sovereignty and security of the country as a whole".
- In October, the EU Council (Foreign Affairs Council) expressed “serious concern” about preparations for the referendum, stating that “the holding of such a referendum would challenge the cohesion, sovereignty and territorial integrity of Bosnia and Herzegovina,” and that “it would also risk undermining the efforts to improve the socio-economic situation of all Bosnia and Herzegovina citizens and to make further progress in EU integration”.
- The US Embassy described it as a "political provocation" and "a violation of the Dayton Peace Accords", fearing its repercussion on the BiH population.
- Russia stood out among the international reactions, by defining the consultation as an internal affair of Bosnia and Herzegovina and reminding of the long-standing Bosnian Serb complaints on BiH's judicial system. Russia added that "it is necessary to overcome the reasons behind the problem, instead of directing all forces to fight its visible consequences."

==== Legal challenges ====
Bosniak and Bosnian Croat politicians soon began the process of attempting to suspend the referendum.

- Despite divisions among the Croat caucus, Bosniak MPs in the RS Assembly challenged in front of the RS Constitutional Court the compliance with the RS Constitution of the assembly's decision allowing the referendum to be held, raising their vital national interest veto (VNI). As a response, the majority of the RS Council challenged the Bosniak veto before the RS Constitutional Court. Finally, the RS Constitutional Court rejected their appeal in September 2015. RS officials announced that the vote would be held on October 15. In fact, while the text of the RS Constitutions empowers two RS Constitutional judges over seven to back a veto, the rules of procedure of the same RS Constitutional Court require a two thirds majority for the same decision, de facto circumventing the constitutional text and voiding of power any VNI veto.
- On 1 October 2015 the caucus of Bosniak MPs in the Council of Peoples of Republika Srpska (the Entity's upper chamber) filed a legal complaint to temporarily block the establishment of the commission tasked to organize the referendum, invoking the clause that it violated the "vital national interest" of Bosniaks in the entity. Bosniaks noted that the 9-member commission was composed only of ethnic Serbs from the RS ruling coalition, with no opposition or non-Serb RS MP member.
- Further legal challenges up to the BiH Constitutional Court would have been possible.

In February 2016, the referendum was indefinitely postponed, officially for lack of consensus among Bosnian Serb parties, after intense political pressures from abroad, including from Serbia's President and Prime Minister Yet, the RS Assembly's decision was not withdrawn. RS President Dodik merely withheld its approval for publication in the entity’s Official Gazette, which would have made it finally binding.

Legally, the RS referendum would not have been able to impede or influence the work of the state judicial institutions, which are established under state law. Yet, it would have raised inter-ethnic tensions in the country.

Western diplomats in Bosnia saw the referendum move - and the following legal challenges at RS and BiH level - as a way for RS President Dodik to keep up the political pressure on domestic state institutions and score political points in the run-up to the 2016 local elections, while hiding the dire socio-economic conditions in the Entity.

=== 2016 referendum on the National Day of Republika Srpska ===
On 26 November 2015 the Constitutional Court of Bosnia and Herzegovina ruled against the constitutionality of the RS National Day, held on 9 January, deeming it discriminatory against non-Serbs. The date marks the Orthodox day of St.Stephen, as well as the 1992 establishment of Republika Srpska as a secessionist entity of the then Republic of Bosnia and Herzegovina. The Court gave six months to the RS to establish a different entity holiday.

RS authorities reacted by contesting the decision of the BiH Constitutional Court and calling for constitutional amendments within 120 days to get rid of international judges sitting in the Court, simultaneously calling for a popular referendum on whether RS citizens support the decision of the Constitutional Court. RS opposition leaders also joined Dodik in contesting the decision of the BiH Constitutional Court.

On 9 January 2016 Republika Srska authorities celebrated the "unconstitutional" holiday, in spite of the Court ruling. Serbia's prime minister Aleksandar Vucic also attended the event. Croat RS MPs also supported the RS Day and the referendum.

The RS National Assembly passed a resolution on the referendum on 15 July 2016, with the backing of all Serb parties and the boycott of Bosniak RS MPs. The referendum question will be: “Do you agree that January 9 should be marked and celebrated as the Day of Republika Srpska?" The Council for Protection of Vital National Interests of the Republika Srpska Constitutional Court in Banja Luka stated the decision would not endanger the "vital national interests" of the Bosniak people, thus not allowing them to veto it. Milorad Dodik confirmed that the referendum would be held on 25 September, one week before the planned 2 October local elections. The High Representative Valentin Inzko decried that, by doing so, RS authorities are directly in breach of the Dayton agreement.

=== Sovereignty referendum ===
On 25 April 2015 the ruling SNSD party adopted a declaration entitled “Republika Srpska — free and independent — future and responsibility”, stating its intention to organize a referendum on the independence of the Republika Srpska in case competences are not returned from the State to the Entities by 2017. The declaration also suggests that RS authorities might decide “by law which decisions made by the Bosnia and Herzegovina authorities shall be applicable on the territory of Republika Srpska”.

RS president Milorad Dodik reiterated to the press the commitment to an independence referendum in the coming years if his demands are not met. His stated political goal is to scale back the institutions of Bosnia and Herzegovina to the letter of the 1995 Dayton Peace Agreement, undoing the developments of the last twenty years including the Court of BiH and BiH Prosecutor’s Office, as well as tweak such letter by getting rid of international judges sitting in the BiH Constitutional Court.
