= Soklič =

Soklič is a surname. Notable people with the surname include:

- Ana Soklič (born 1984), Slovenian singer
- Emilija Soklič (born 1918), Slovenian electrical engineer and filmmaker
- Matej Soklič (born 1973), Slovenian cross-country skier
