= 2024 in Bosnia and Herzegovina =

- Decades: 2000s; 2010s; 2020s
- See also: Other events of 2024; Timeline of Bosnian and Herzegovinian history

Events in the year 2024 in Bosnia and Herzegovina.

== Incumbents ==
- Presidency of Bosnia and Herzegovina:
    - Denis Bećirović
    - Željka Cvijanović
    - Željko Komšić
- Chairwoman of the Council of Ministers: Borjana Krišto

== Events ==
- 25–30 January – 2024 IIHF U20 World Championship Division III B
- 21 June – A massive power outage leaves the majority of the country without electricity.
- 21 August – Three employees are killed in a shooting at a high school in Sanski Most. The suspect, who is also an employee of the school, is hospitalised after shooting himself.
- 22 August – At least 11 people are killed after a boat carrying migrants capsizes in the Drina River near Bratunac, along the border with Serbia.
- 19 September – The Vatican recognises Medjugorje as a Catholic shrine, but stops short of recognising the apparitions associated with the Our Lady of Medjugorje.
- 4 October – At least 26 people are killed in flooding and landslides caused by heavy rains in the Jablanica area.
- 6 October – 2024 Bosnian municipal elections
- 23 October – A court in the United States convicts Kemal Mrndzic of fraud in covering up his role in war crimes against ethnic Serbs during the Bosnian civil war as a prison guard at the Čelebići camp in order to obtain refugee status and subsequent US citizenship.
- 24 October – A police officer is killed and another is injured in a knife attack on a police station in Bosanska Krupa. The suspect, a 14-year old, is arrested.

== Holidays ==
- 1-2 January - New Year's Day
- 6 January - Orthodox Christmas Eve (RS)
- 7 January - Orthodox Christmas (RS)
- 9 January - Republic Day (RS)
- 14 January - New Year's Day (RS)
- 1 March - Independence Day (FBiH)
- 31 March - Catholic Easter (FBiH)
- 1 April - Catholic Easter Monday (FBiH)
- 10 April – Ramadan Bajram (FBiH)
- 1-2 May - Labour Day
- 3 May - Orthodox Good Friday (RS)
- 5 May - Orthodox Easter (RS)
- 6 May - Orthodox Easter Monday (RS)
- 9 May - Victory Day (RS)
- 16 June – Kurban Bajram (FBiH)
- 28 June - Saint Vitus Day (RS)
- 1 November - All Saints' Day (FBiH)
- 21 November - Dayton Agreement Day (RS)
- 25 November - Statehood Day (FBiH)
- 25 December - Catholic Christmas (FBiH)

== Art and entertainment ==
- List of Bosnian submissions for the Academy Award for Best International Feature Film
