= Statehood Day =

Statehood Day may refer to:

- Statehood Day (Bosnia and Herzegovina)
- Statehood Day (Croatia)
- Statehood Day (Hawaii)
- Statehood Day (Lithuania)
- Statehood Day (Montenegro)
- Statehood Day (Serbia)
- Statehood Day (Slovenia)
- Statehood Day (Ukraine)

== See also ==
- List of U.S. states by date of admission to the Union
