= 2021 in Bosnia and Herzegovina =

- Decades: 2000s; 2010s; 2020s
- See also: Other events of 2021; Timeline of Bosnian and Herzegovinian history

Events in the year 2021 in Bosnia and Herzegovina.

== Incumbents ==
- Presidency of Bosnia and Herzegovina:
    - Milorad Dodik
    - Šefik Džaferović
    - Željko Komšić
- Chairman of the Council of Ministers: Zoran Tegeltija

== Events ==
Ongoing – COVID-19 pandemic in Bosnia and Herzegovina

=== January ===
- 1 January – 2021 Tribistovo poisoning: Eight teenagers from the town of Posušje, aged between 18 and 19, died during New Year's Eve, the cause of death being suffocation from inhaling toxic gas, later reported as carbon monoxide poisoning. A national day of mourning was held on 2 January.

=== February ===
- 12 February – COVID-19 vaccination for the COVID-19 pandemic started in the entity of Republika Srpska, with the Russian Sputnik V vaccine used.
- 21 February – Municipal elections were repeated in the cities of Doboj and Srebrenica to elect mayors and assemblies.

=== March ===
- 2 March – Serbian president Aleksandar Vučić came to Sarajevo and donated 10,000 doses of AstraZeneca COVID-19 vaccines for the COVID-19 pandemic.
- 10 March – COVID-19 vaccination for the COVID-19 pandemic started in the entity of the Federation of Bosnia and Herzegovina, with the AstraZeneca vaccine donated from Vučić used.
- 25 March – The first doses of the Pfizer–BioNTech COVID-19 vaccine, 24,300 of them, arrived through COVAX at the Sarajevo International Airport. The same day, 26,400 doses of the AstraZeneca COVID-19 vaccines arrived also through COVAX at the Sarajevo International Airport.

=== April ===
- 8 April – Benjamina Karić is elected to become the 39th Mayor of Sarajevo.
- 12 April: The start of the 2021 Balkan non-papers.
  - The paper called for the "peaceful dissolution" of Bosnia and Herzegovina with the annexation of Republika Srpska and great parts of Herzegovina and Central Bosnia into a Greater Serbia and Greater Croatia, leaving a small Bosniak state in what is central and western Bosnia,

=== November ===
- 4 November – 2021 floods in Bosnia and Herzegovina

== Deaths ==
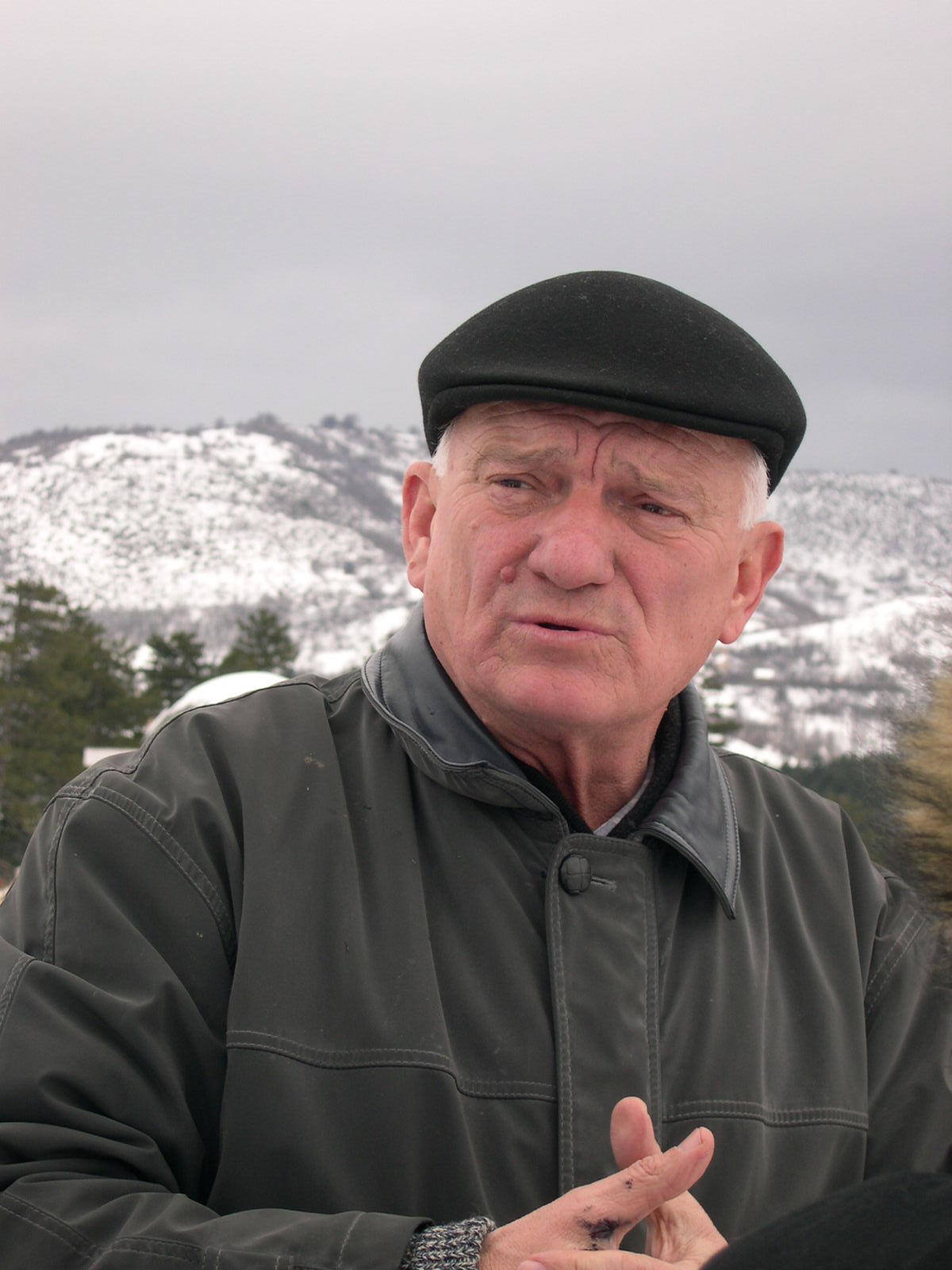
Jovan Divjak

=== March ===
- 26 March – Želimir Altarac Čičak, rock promoter, poet, songwriter, music critic, and publicist (b. 1947).

=== April ===
- 8 April – Jovan Divjak, Bosnian army general (b. 1937).

=== June ===
- 3 June – Murat Šaran, Bosnian professional footballer (b. 1949).

=== September ===
- 3 September – Ljubo Bešlić, politician, mayor of Mostar (b. 1958).
- 5 September – Živko Radišić, politician, member and chairman of the Presidency (b. 1937).

=== November ===
- 7 November 2021 – Hasan Čengić, politician (b. 1957).
