= Statehood Day (Croatia) =

Holiday in Croatia

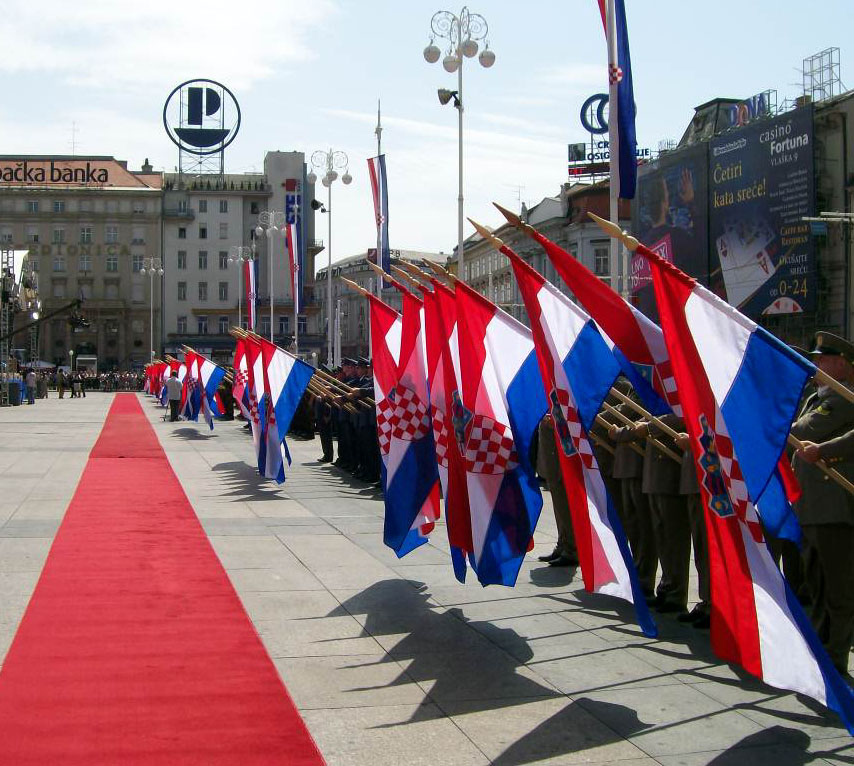
- Croatian flags on Statehood Day, 2007
- Official name: Dan državnosti (in Croatian)
- Observed by: Croatia
- Significance: Anniversary of the constitution of the 1990 Croatian Parliament
- Celebrations: Family reunions, barbecues, picnics, parades
- Date: 30 May
- Next time: 30 May 2027
- Frequency: annual

Statehood Day (Croatian: Dan državnosti, pronounced [dan dr̩ʒaʋnosti]) is an annual public holiday and national day commemorated since 1990 on 30 May in Croatia to celebrate the constitution and the first modern multi-party Croatian Parliament. It is a non-working day for all government employees and the majority of the Croatian labour force.

There are no strict or established protocols of celebration associated with the holiday. It is usually celebrated outdoors and marked by family reunions, picnics, barbecues, flag-raising and national anthem-playing ceremonies; civilian and military parades occur on quinquennial or decennial anniversaries.

== History ==
On 30 May 1990, the first modern multi-party Croatian Parliament convened, following the 1990 Croatian parliamentary election. On 25 June 1991, after the independence referendum held on 19 May 1991, Croatia proclaimed its independence, but due to the negotiation of the Brioni Agreement, a three-month moratorium was placed on the implementation of the decision and the Parliament cut all remaining ties with Yugoslavia on 8 October 1991.

30 May was from 1990 to 2002 marked as the Statehood Day. The Government of Ivica Račan moved the Statehood Day to 25 June in 2002, and 30 May was marked as a memorial day (working) under the name Day of the Croatian Parliament. 8 October was a holiday, Independence Day from 2002 to 2019, when it was declared a memorial day (working).

Slovenia declared independence from Yugoslavia at the same time, and its Statehood Day coincided with the Croatian Statehood Day, on 25 June. On 14 November 2019, the Croatian Parliament adopted a new law on holidays, and moved Statehood Day back to 30 May.The previous date, 25 June, was attributed to Independence Day, which became a working memorial day, itself moved from 8 October.

== Activities and celebrations ==
Typical state activities involve speeches by the President of Croatia and other dignitaries, as well as commemoration of the Croatian War of Independence. The first military parade of the Armed Forces of Croatia took place in the neighborhood of Jarun in 1995.

== See also ==
- Statehood Day in other countries
- Holidays in Croatia
- Independence of Croatia
- Croatian War of Independence
