= 2020 in Bosnia and Herzegovina =

- Decades: 2000s; 2010s; 2020s
- See also: Other events of 2020; Timeline of Bosnian and Herzegovinian history

Events in the year 2020 in Bosnia and Herzegovina.

== Incumbents ==
- Presidency of Bosnia and Herzegovina:
    - Milorad Dodik
    - Šefik Džaferović
    - Željko Komšić
- Chairman of the Council of Ministers: Zoran Tegeltija

== Events ==
=== March ===
- 5 March – The first case of COVID-19 in the country is reported by officials in Republika Srpska. The person, who had been in Italy during the COVID-19 pandemic, tested positive in Banja Luka.
- 16 March – The Ministry of Health of Republika Srpska announced the first two recoveries in the country, both from Banja Luka.
- 17 March – A state of emergency is declared in the country over COVID-19. The Bosnian military begins to set up tent quarantines on the border with Republika Srpska, which itself has declared a state of emergency.
- 20 March – The first cases in Sarajevo were confirmed.
- 21 March – The first COVID-19 death in the country was announced in a hospital in Bihać. The patient was an elderly woman who had been hospitalized two days before.
- 23 March
  - The first cases in Brčko District were confirmed. The cases were two people who arrived to Brčko from the Caribbean via airports in France and Serbia.
  - The Swiss embassy in the country informed the Minister of Security that Switzerland had allocated US$200,000 to assist the country during the pandemic.
  - The U.S. donated medical materials and other important supplies to the Armed Forces of Bosnia and Herzegovina. USAID also donated US$1.2 million to the country to help it tackle the pandemic.
- 24 March – Turkey sent protective masks, gloves, protective suits and goggles to the Red Cross Society of Bosnia and Herzegovina.

=== April ===
- 9 April – Russia sent three military planes carrying medical equipment, including protections masks and respirators, vehicles for disinfection, and medical personnel, to help Republika Srpska.
- 16 April
  - Hungary sent a plane with medical help, including respirators, to Banja Luka to help Republika Srpska, and truck with protective equipment to Sarajevo to help the Federation of Bosnia and Herzegovina. Hungarian Foreign Minister Péter Szijjártó, who accompanied the shipment, met Bosnian Foreign Minister Bisera Turković in Sarajevo and was due to meet Milorad Dodik, Serbian member of the Bosnian state presidency, later on in Banja Luka.
  - Slovenia sent €133,000 worth of humanitarian aid to help the country fight COVID-19.
- 23 April – Azerbaijan sent to the country 10 tons protective and medical equipment, including 2 million protective masks, to help combat COVID-19.

=== May ===
- 19 May – A Qatari Airplane carrying an urgent medical aid shipment arrived in Sarajevo International Airport to help tackle the pandemic in the country.

=== July ===
- 11 July – The country commemorated 25 years since the Srebrenica massacre.

=== November ===
- 15 November – Municipal elections were held in the country to elect mayors and assemblies in 143 municipalities.

== Deaths ==
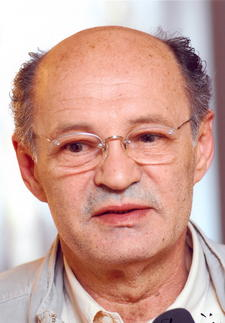
Mustafa Nadarević

=== February ===
- 26 February – Muhamed Filipović, writer, essayist, theorist and philosopher (b. 1929).

=== March ===
- 10 March – Beba Selimović, folk and sevdalinka singer (b. 1936).

=== April ===
- 19 April – Emina Zečaj, sevdalinka singer (b. 1929).

=== July ===
- 29 July – Salko Bukvarević, politician and soldier (b. 1967).

=== September ===
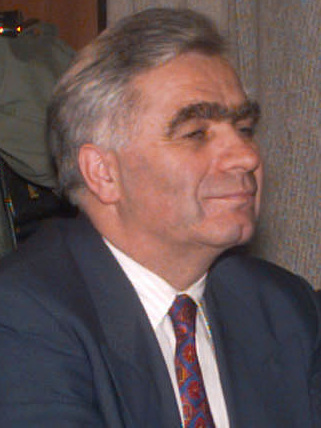
Momčilo Krajišnik

- 15 September – Momčilo Krajišnik, politician, member of the Presidency and convicted war criminal (b. 1945).

=== November ===
- 4 November – Sead Gološ, architect (b. 1969).
- 14 November – Hasan Muratović, politician, chairman of the Council of Ministers, entrepreneur and professor (b. 1940).
- 22 November – Mustafa Nadarević, film, theatre and television actor (b. 1943).
- 23 November – Admir Džubur, businessman and football administrator (b. 1964).

=== December ===
- 14 December – Milomir Odović, professional football manager and player (b. 1955).
- 23 December – Mićo Mićić, politician (b. 1956).
