= 2023 in Bosnia and Herzegovina =

- Decades: 2000s; 2010s; 2020s
- See also: Other events of 2023; Timeline of Bosnian and Herzegovinian history

Events in the year 2023 in Bosnia and Herzegovina.

== Incumbents ==
- Presidency of Bosnia and Herzegovina:
    - Denis Bećirović
    - Željka Cvijanović
    - Željko Komšić
- Chairperson of the Council of Ministers: Zoran Tegeltija (until 25 January); Borjana Krišto onwards

== Events ==
Ongoing – COVID-19 pandemic in Bosnia and Herzegovina

- 22 October – Several thousand people gather in Sarajevo, Bosnia, waving Palestinian and Bosnian flags and demanding a halt to Israel’s bombardment of Gaza.

== Sports ==
- 15 July 2022 – 28 May 2023: 2022–23 Premier League of Bosnia and Herzegovina
- 30 September 2022 – 16 April 2023: 2022–23 ABA League First Division
- 2022–23 Bosnia and Herzegovina Football Cup
