= 2019 in Bosnia and Herzegovina =

- Decades: 1990s; 2000s; 2010s; 2020s
- See also: Other events of 2019; Timeline of Bosnian and Herzegovinian history

Events in the year 2019 in Bosnia and Herzegovina.

== Incumbents ==
- Presidency of Bosnia and Herzegovina:
    - Milorad Dodik
    - Šefik Džaferović
    - Željko Komšić
- Chairman of the Council of Ministers: Denis Zvizdić (until 23 December); Zoran Tegeltija onwards

== Events ==
=== January ===
- 22 January – Five foreign demining experts, including one Bosnian, were killed in an accidental explosion in Yemen.

=== June ===
- 1 June – Twenty-nine people were injured in a fire at a center used as temporary accommodation for about 500 migrants in the northwestern Bosnian town of Velika Kladusa.

=== November ===
- 26 November – Earthquakes occurred in southern Bosnia.

=== December ===
- 5 December – The country takes full control of its airspace for the first time since the end of the Bosnian War. Bosnia's air space had been controlled by NATO between 1995 and 2003, following which it was controlled jointly by Serbia and Croatia until this announcement.
- 23 December – The Bosnian parliament approves Prime Minister Zoran Tegeltija's cabinet after a 14-month deadlock, caused by disagreements over proceeding with NATO integration, with Tegeltija stating his main priority is pursuing membership with the European Union.
- 31 December – Former Bosnian Serb Army general Milomir Savčić is indicted for his role in planning the Srebrenica massacre.
