= 1993 Republika Srpska referendum =

A two-part referendum was held in Republika Srpska on 15 and 16 May 1993. Voters were asked whether they approved of the Vance-Owen Peace Plan, and whether Republika Srpska should be able to join another country.

Although President Radovan Karadžić had signed the Vance-Owen Peace Plan on 30 April, it was rejected by the National Assembly on 6 May, and subsequently referred to a referendum. It was subsequently rejected by 97% of voters, whilst the proposal to allow the territory to join other countries was approved by a similar percentage.

Mediators referred to the referendum as a "sham".

== Results ==
Question	For		Against		Invalid/ blank	Total votes	Registered voters	Turnout	Result
Question	Votes	%	Votes	%	Invalid/ blank	Total votes	Registered voters	Turnout	Result
Vance-Owen Peace Plan	35,212	3.21	1,060,348	96.79	6,657	1,102,223	1,200,772	91.79	Rejected
Republika Srpska free to join other countries	1,061,140	96.87	34,323	3.13	6,754	1,102,223	1,200,772	91.79	Approved
Source: Direct Democracy
