= 2026 Brčko helicopter crash =

Aviation accident in Bosnia and Herzegovina

Occurrence
- Date: 29 October 2026
- Summary: Under investigation
- Site: Gorice, Brčko, Bosnia and Herzegovina; 44.91189°N 18.73869°E
- Total fatalities: 4
- Total injuries: 11

Aircraft
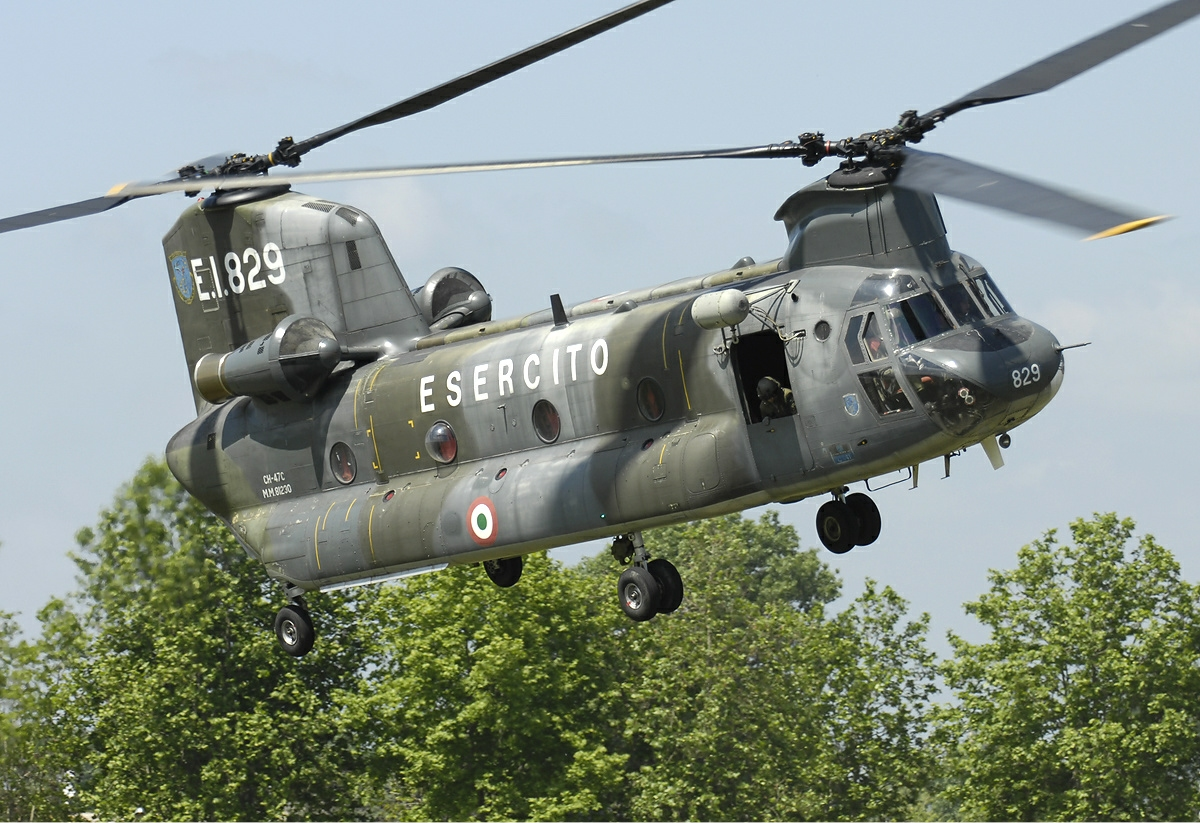
- An Italian Army CH-47C Chinook, similar to the one involved
- Aircraft type: Boeing CH-47 Chinook
- Operator: Italian Army
- Registration: MM81782
- Occupants: 15
- Passengers: 0
- Crew: 15
- Fatalities: 4
- Injuries: 11
- Survivors: 11

On 29 October 2026 at 16:00 local time, a Boeing CH-47 Chinook operated by the Italian Army crashed during routine training as part of Operation Althea in Gorice, Brčko District, Bosnia and Herzegovina. Four of the 15 people onboard were killed while the remaining 11 were all injured. The cause of the crash is under investigation.

== Background ==
=== Aircraft ===
The aircraft was a Boeing CH-47 Chinook with the registration number MM81782. The aircraft was manufactured in 2014 and flew that same year and then operated by the Italian Army up until the accident. The aircraft was initially stationed at Viterbo Air Base, and then ferried to Bosnia and Herzegovina to take part in Operation Althea, a EU-sponsored peacekeeping mission in the country.

=== Occupants ===
There were 15 people aboard the aircraft, all of them Italian nationals.

== Takeoff and crash ==
The aircraft initially rotated about 20-30 feet above the ground before the aircraft then hovered before disaster struck. Video footage shows the aircraft hover a few seconds before suddenly falling to the ground before the pilots lost full control and the aircraft slammed into the ground. There was no fire, but the aircraft was completely destroyed and eventually written off.

=== Victims ===
Of the 15 aboard three initially died in the crash and one later died due to severe injuries. Eleven others suffered both severe and serious injuries but none were life threatening. The four victims were two soldiers and two members of the Italian Red Cross.

== Investigation ==
The Italian Army stated that they will be conducting an investigation, alongside with EUFOR, into the accident to find out the cause of the crash. One of the first hypotheses is that the aircraft hit high voltage cables on take off, as stated by some eyewitnesses.

== Reactions ==
The Mayor of Brčko District, Siniša Milić, declared 30 October a day of mourning in the district.

On 30 October, Italian defense minister Guido Crosetto went to Bosnia and Herzegovina to visit the eleven injured survivors of the accident.

On the same day, the Prosecutor's Office of Bosnia and Herzegovina ordered the Ministry of Communications and Transport to form a specialized investigative team for aircraft accidents.

On 2 November the bodies of the four victims of the crash where brought back to Italy through a Lockheed C-130 Hercules of the Italian Air Force. The airplane arrived at Rome Ciampino Airport where military and political figures, including president Sergio Mattarella and prime minister Giorgia Meloni, were present.

== See also ==
- 1994 Mull of Kintyre Chinook crash
- 2026 Uttarakhand helicopter crash
- List of accidents and incidents involving military aircraft (2020-present)
