= 1100th Anniversary of the Croatian Kingdom =

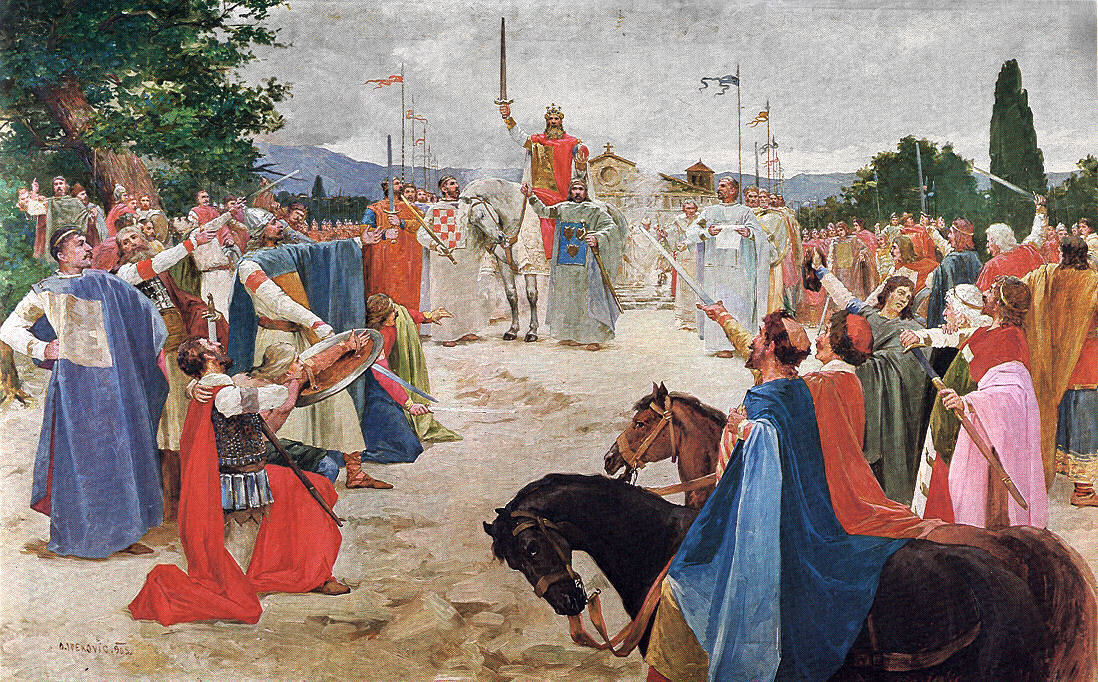
"Coronation of Tomislav", painting by Oton Iveković

The 1100th anniversary of Croatian Kingdom (Croatian: Tisućustogodišnjica Hrvatskoga Kraljevstva) is a cultural and media anniversary year that was celebrated in 2025 in Croatia and Bosnia and Herzegovina, as well as in other areas with Croatian population.

The occasion for the celebrations is the 1100th anniversary of the Croatian Kingdom (925–1102) and the coronation of the first Croatian king, Tomislav, which is estimated to have taken place in 925.

On the initiative of the Brethren of the Croatian Dragon and independent cultural institution Matica Hrvatska the Croatian Parliament passed a resolution on 14 March 2024 declaring 2025 the "Year of remembrance of the Croatian Kingdom". This decision was welcomed by the Government of the Republic of Croatia, Ministry of Science and Education and the Ministry of Culture and Media.

== Historical context ==
=== 1000th anniversary of Croatian Kingdom in 1925 ===
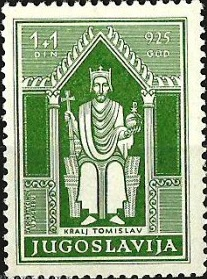
A stamp from the Kingdom of Yugoslavia commemorating the Croatian King Tomislav and the year 925

In 1925 the Society of Brethren of the Croatian Dragon organized a commemorative year in honor of the millennium of the medieval Croatian Kingdom. It was celebrated throughout the territory of the Kingdom of Yugoslavia.

These historic celebrations also inspired the ideas for the year 2025.

== Celebrations ==
Ceremonies in Croatian cities, as well as museum exhibitions and lectures were announced and held. Special stamps and commemorative coin were also issued. In addition to a Croatian 2 euro commemorative coin for 2025 announced by the Croatian National Bank, silver and gold coins were also released by Croatian Mint.

== See also ==
- History of Croatia
- Kingdom of Croatia (925–1102)
