= Karel Zelenko =

Slovenian artist (1925–2026)

- Born: 15 September 1925; Celje, Kingdom of Serbs, Croats and Slovenes
- Died: 1 October 2026 (aged 101)
- Education: Academy of Fine Arts and Design, Ljubljana
- Occupations: Graphic artist; painter
- Awards: Prešeren Fund Award (1964); Order of Labour (1979)

Karel Zelenko (15 September 1925 – 1 October 2026) was a Slovenian graphic artist and painter. In 1964, he was awarded the Prešeren Fund Award, and then again in 1979, he was awarded Order of Labour.

== Early life and career ==
Karel Zelenko was born on 15 September 1925 in Celje, Kingdom of Serbs, Croats and Slovenes. After he finished studying in lower secondary school, he studied in the School of Arts and Crafts in Ljubljana in 1940, with a famous sculptor France Kralj. In 1941, during the World War II and Invasion of Yugoslavia, he continued his education in Graz from 1941 to 1943. He then studied at Academy of Fine Arts Vienna until 1944 when he worked at a Vienna printing house. He then returned to Slovenia after escaping the Bombing of Vienna.

He started his career when he worked in the ceramic business in Kamnik. From 1954 to 1959, he became a teacher and taught at the Design School in Ljubljana. In 1959, he decided to stop teaching and worked as an independent artist, establishing studios in Ljubljana and Grožnjan, Croatia. He had achieved success with exhibitions in many countries such as Belgium and Netherlands. He also worked as an illustrator and designer of ceramic jewelry.

== Personal life and death ==
Zelenko was married to Sonja Rauter Zelenko, and together they had two daughters; Rok, a painter and graphic artist, and Nina, an artist and photographer. Sonja died in 2010.

Zelenko died on 1 October 2026, at the age of 101.

== Gallery ==
Painting of Blaž Kantušer, father of Božidar Kantušer

Painting of Katarina Kantušer, mother of Božidar Kantušer
