= Ministry of Foreign and European Affairs =

Ministry of Foreign and European Affairs may refer to the following Foreign Ministries:

- Federal Ministry for European and International Affairs (Austria)
- Ministry of Foreign and European Affairs (Croatia)
- Ministry for Europe and Foreign Affairs (France)
- Ministry of Foreign Affairs and European Integration (Moldova)
- Ministry of Foreign and European Affairs (Slovakia)
- Ministry of Foreign and European Affairs (Slovenia)

It may also refer to the foreign ministry of the European Union:

- (European Union) European External Action Service

Or any European foreign ministry:

- Ministry for Europe and Foreign Affairs (Albania)
- Ministry of External Affairs (Andorra)
- Ministry of Foreign Affairs (Armenia)
- Ministry of Foreign Affairs (Azerbaijan)
- Ministry of Foreign Affairs (Belarus)
- Federal Public Service Foreign Affairs (Belgium)
- Ministry of Foreign Affairs (Bosnia and Herzegovina)
- Ministry of Foreign Affairs (Bulgaria)
- Ministry of Foreign Affairs (Cyprus)
- Ministry of Foreign Affairs (Czech Republic)
- Ministry of Foreign Affairs (Denmark)
- Ministry of Foreign Affairs (Estonia)
- Ministry for Foreign Affairs (Finland)
- (Georgia (country)) Ministry of Foreign Affairs of Georgia
- Federal Foreign Office (Germany)
- Ministry of Foreign Affairs (Greece)
- Ministry of Foreign Affairs (Hungary)
- Ministry for Foreign Affairs (Iceland)
- (Republic of Ireland) Department of Foreign Affairs and Trade (Ireland)
- Ministry of Foreign Affairs (Italy)
- Ministry of Foreign Affairs (Kosovo)
- Ministry of Foreign Affairs (Latvia)
- Ministry of Foreign Affairs (Lithuania)
- Ministry of Foreign Affairs (Luxembourg)
- Ministry for Foreign and European Affairs (Malta)
- Department of External Relations (Monaco)
- Ministry of Foreign Affairs (Montenegro)
- (Republic of Artsakh) Ministry of Foreign Affairs (Nagorno-Karabakh)
- Ministry of Foreign Affairs (Netherlands)
- Ministry of Foreign Affairs (Norway)
- Ministry of Foreign Affairs (Poland)
- Ministry of Foreign Affairs (Portugal)
- Ministry of Foreign Affairs (Romania)
- Ministry of Foreign Affairs (Russia)
- Ministry of Foreign Affairs (Serbia)
- Ministry of Foreign Affairs (Slovenia)
- Ministry of Foreign Affairs, European Union and Cooperation (Spain)
- Ministry for Foreign Affairs (Sweden)
- Federal Department of Foreign Affairs (Switzerland)
- Ministry of Foreign Affairs (Turkey)
- Ministry of Foreign Affairs (Ukraine)
- Foreign, Commonwealth and Development Office (United Kingdom)
- Secretariat of State (Holy See) (Vatican City)
