= Asim Kurjak =

Bosnian physician (1942–2026)

Asim Kurjak (13 September 1942 – 23 October 2026) was a Bosnian physician who was the President of International Academy of Perinatal Medicine and director of Ian Donald Inter-University School of Medical Ultrasound. He was a regular fellow of World Academy of Art and Science, European Academy of Sciences and Art, International Academy for Human Reproduction, Italian Academy of Science and Art of Reggio Puglia, Academy of Medical Sciences of Catalonia; honorary member of American Institute of Ultrasound in Medicine and Biology; regular member of Russian Academy of Science and Art.

Kurjak died on 23 October 2026, at the age of 84.

== Plagiarism ==
Kurjak was accused of multiple instances of plagiarism. In May 2007, the Committee for Ethics in Science and Higher Education found Kurjak guilty of “violations of the [committee's] ethics code . . . and of common norms in biomedical publishing.”

== Awards ==
- The Fetus as a Patient Society's Prize William Liley (1998)
- Maternity Prize given by European Association of Perinatal Medicine (2000)
- The Order of the Croatian Star with the Effigy of Ruđer Bošković (2001)
- Pavao Ćulumović Prize of Croatian Medical Association (2003)
- Golden Amnioscope given by International Academy of Perinatal Medicine (2008)
- Erich Saling Perinatal Prize (2012)
- Ruđer Bošković National Prize for Science of Croatia (2012)

Kurjak was an honorary member of 28 international societies for ultrasound or perinatal medicine. He was also a member of the editorial board or editor in chief of several international journals including Donald School Journal of Ultrasound in Obstetrics and Gynecology, co editor of Journal of Perinatal Medicine.

== Sources ==
- Personal website
