= Statehood Day (Serbia) =

Public holiday in Serbia

- Flag of the First Serbian Uprising
- Official name: Statehood Day
- Also called: Sretenje
- Observed by: Serbia
- Date: 15 February
- Next time: 15 February 2027
- Frequency: annual

Statehood Day (Serbian: Дан државности, romanized: Dan državnosti, Serbian pronunciation: [dan dr̩ʒaʋnosti]), also known as the Sretenje (Serbian: Сретење), is a public holiday celebrated every 15 February in Serbia to commemorate the outbreak of the First Serbian Uprising in 1804, which evolved into the Serbian Revolution against Ottoman rule. On the same day in 1835, the first modern Serbian constitution, known as the "Sretenje Constitution" or "Candlemas Constitution", was adopted. Official celebrations last for two days.

The Republika Srpska has observed the Statehood Day along with Serbia since 2025.

== History ==
The two-day holiday commemorates the start of the First Serbian Uprising against the Ottoman Empire in 1804, developing into the Serbian Revolution. On the same day, the first Serbian constitution, the Sretenje Constitution, was adopted in 15 February 1835. It was recognized as a national holiday for the first time in 2001.

== In popular culture ==
Google Doodles and Facebook have commemorated the holiday in the 21st century.

== See also ==
- Public holidays in Serbia
- Statehood Day
- List of national independence days
