= Zdenko Roter =

Slovenian sociologist (1926–2025)

Zdenko Roter (12 August 1926 – 1 August 2025) was a Slovenian sociologist.

== Life and career ==
Roter was born in Ljubljana on 12 August 1926. Before turning 16, he joined the Partisans in 1942. Prior to that, he served as an operative in various actions of the Liberation Front.

In 2004, he co-founded the political association Forum 21. In his memoirs Fallen Masks, he described his life journey from the partisan days to his post-independence role in influencing politics in Slovenia.

He was an advisor to President Milan Kučan and, according to his own words, influenced the selection of Danilo Türk's run for the 2007 presidential election.

In 2002, he received the Golden Honorary Badge of Freedom of the Republic of Slovenia with the following justification: "for self-sacrificing work for the good of the Slovenian state".

Roter died on August 1, 2025, at the age of 98.
