= 1994 Republika Srpska Contact Group partition plan referendum =

- 28 August 1994

Results
Choice	Votes	%
Yes	32,429	3.35%
No	936,934	96.65%
Valid votes	969,363	99.45%
Invalid or blank votes	5,349	0.55%
Total votes	974,712	100.00%
Registered voters/turnout	1,068,469	91.23%

A referendum on the Contact Group plan was held in Republika Srpska on 28 August 1994, after the National Assembly had rejected the plan on 8 August. The plan would give 49% of Bosnia and Herzegovina to Serbs, around a third less than they held at the time. It was rejected by 97% of voters. Following the referendum, Bosnian Serb President Radovan Karadžić said "We will ask for another map... We expect a new conference, new peace efforts." However, the Contact Group (the United States, Russia, Britain, France and Germany) claimed the referendum was a sham.

== Results ==
Choice	Votes	%
For	32,429	3.35
Against	936,934	96.65
Invalid/blank votes	5,349	–
Total	974,712	100
Registered voters/turnout	1,068,469	91.23
Source: Direct Democracy
