= Paša Gackić =

- Born: 30 June 1947; Sarajevo, Socialist Republic of Bosnia and Herzegovina
- Died: 5 June 2022 (aged 74); Sarajevo, Bosnia and Herzegovina
- Education: Sarajevo Music Academy
- Occupations: Soprano; Opera soloist; Music pedagogue

Paša Gackić (30 June 1947 – 5 June 2022) was a Bosnian soprano, opera soloist and music pedagogue. A graduate of the Sarajevo Music Academy, she was a permanent member of the ensemble at the Sarajevo National Theatre, a soloist from 1973 to 1993, playing a number of leading roles. Gackić performed across Bosnia and Herzegovina in multiple festival cultural centres of the former Yugoslavia under a number of conductors. She was the assistant to the full professor Bruna Špiler at the Sarajevo Music Academy's Department of Solo Singing from 1974 to 1979. Gackić was later appointed to the teaching and artistic role of assistant professor at the Sarajevo Music Academy in 1990, becoming associate professor in 1997 and then full professor in 2003 before retiring in 2017. She was the recipient of several significant awards.

== Early life ==
Gackić was born on 30 June 1947 in Sarajevo, Socialist Republic of Bosnia and Herzegovina. Following the end of elementary school, she enrolled in the Secondary Music School in Sarajevo in the Solo Singing Department and the Theory and Teaching Department, graduating in 1968. That same year, Gackić enrolled at the Sarajevo Music Academy and was in the class of the full professor Bruna Špiler in the Solo Singing Department. She graduated in 1973, earning a grade of 10. Gackić he enrolled in postgraduate studies in the Concert and Opera Department at the Sarajevo Music Academy, doing a master's degree in solo singing that she finished in 1977.

== Career ==
While as a fourth-year student, Gackić made her debut on the stage of the Sarajevo National Theatre in the of Micaëla in Georges Bizet's opera Carmen conducted by Ivan Štajcer. In 1973, she was employed to be a permanent member of the ensemble at the Sarajevo National Theatre, a soloist. Gackić remained with the theatre until 1993, performing a number of leading roles. Such roles were as a soprano and included Mimì in Giacomo Puccini's La bohème, Cio-Cio San in Puccini's Madama Butterfly, Mařenka in Bedřich Smetana's The Bartered Bride, Countess and Cherubino in Wolfgang Amadeus Mozart's The Marriage of Figaro, Leonora in Giuseppe Verdi's Troubadur, Liù in Puccini's Turandot, Đula in Jakov Gotovac's Ero s onoga svijeta and Cat in Cornel Trăilescu's Puss in Boots.

As a soloist, she performed across Bosnia and Herzegovina in multiple festival cultural centres of the former Yugoslavia such as the Sarajevo Winter, Split Summer, Ohrid Summer, Arena Pula, Ljubljana Festival, SNG Ljubljana, HNK Zagreb, Music Days in Budva, May Opera Evenings in Skopje, then "Sacred Music Festival" in Fez in Morocco, BiH Culture Days in Austria in Vienna and Linz, BiH Month in the Czech Republic in Prague, Český Krumlov, Polička, Hradec Králové and Kutná Hora with the Sarajevo Philharmonic Orchestra, RTVSA Symphony Orchestra, Macedonian Philharmonic, MOMUS ensemble, BiH Brass Orchestra, RTVBiH Chamber Orchestra, Sarajevo String Orchestra and the Sarajevo Baroque Trio. Gackić worked under the direction of conductors such as Štajcer, Milan Jeličanin, Marijan Fajdiga, Teodor Romanić, Miroslav Homen, Fimčo Muratovski, Juli Marić, Ion Iancu among others.

From 1974 to 1979, she was Špiler's assistant at the Sarajevo Music Academy's Department of Solo Singing. Gackić was appointed to the teaching and artistic position of assistant professor at the Sarajevo Music Academy in 1990, teaching solo singing, methodology for solo singing and vocal technique basics. Her pupils included the likes of Amila Bakšić, Adema Pljevljak-Krehić. Vedrana Šimić, Berislav Puškarić, Amir Saračević and Violeta Srećković. She was promoted to associate professor in 1997, to full professor in 2003 before retiring in 2017. Her artistic activity was interrupted due to the Bosnian War that took place from 1992 to 1995. Gackić actions were diverted to performances within small artistic ensembles, which corresponded to the conditions of the social and cultural life of that time. She served as director of Opera and Ballet at the Sarajevo National Theatre from 1995 to 1999.

== Death ==
Gackić died in Sarajevo on 5 June 2022. She received a commemorative gathering at the Sarajevo National Theatre on 7 June 2022 and was buried at Gradsko groblje Vlakovo cemetery later that day.

== Recognition ==
For her work, Gackić received a number of significant awards. She was presented the Award of the Association of Young Artists of Bosnia and Herzegovina in 1980, the Recognition of the Ministry of Education, Science, Culture and Sports of the Federation of Bosnia and Herzegovina for the Spread of Musical Culture in 1997; Golden Plaque at the Women of the Year in Culture Award in 1998; the "Golden Branch" at the Women of the Year in Arts Award in 2000; the Letter of Appreciation from the Committee for Marking 50 Years of Work of the Ballet of the National Theater of Sarajevo in 2000; the Recognition of the Association of Music Pedagogues in the Federation of Bosnia and Herzegovina in 2006. Other awards include the Golden Plaque of the Academy of Music in Sarajevo "for an exceptional contribution to the development of the Academy of Music, musical art, science and pedagogy in Bosnia and Herzegovina on the occasion of its 50th anniversary" in 2006, as well as the Award of the University of Sarajevo for the most successful professor in the academic year 2008/09 by the Senate of the University of Sarajevo.
