= Independence Day (Croatia) =

Memorial day in Croatia

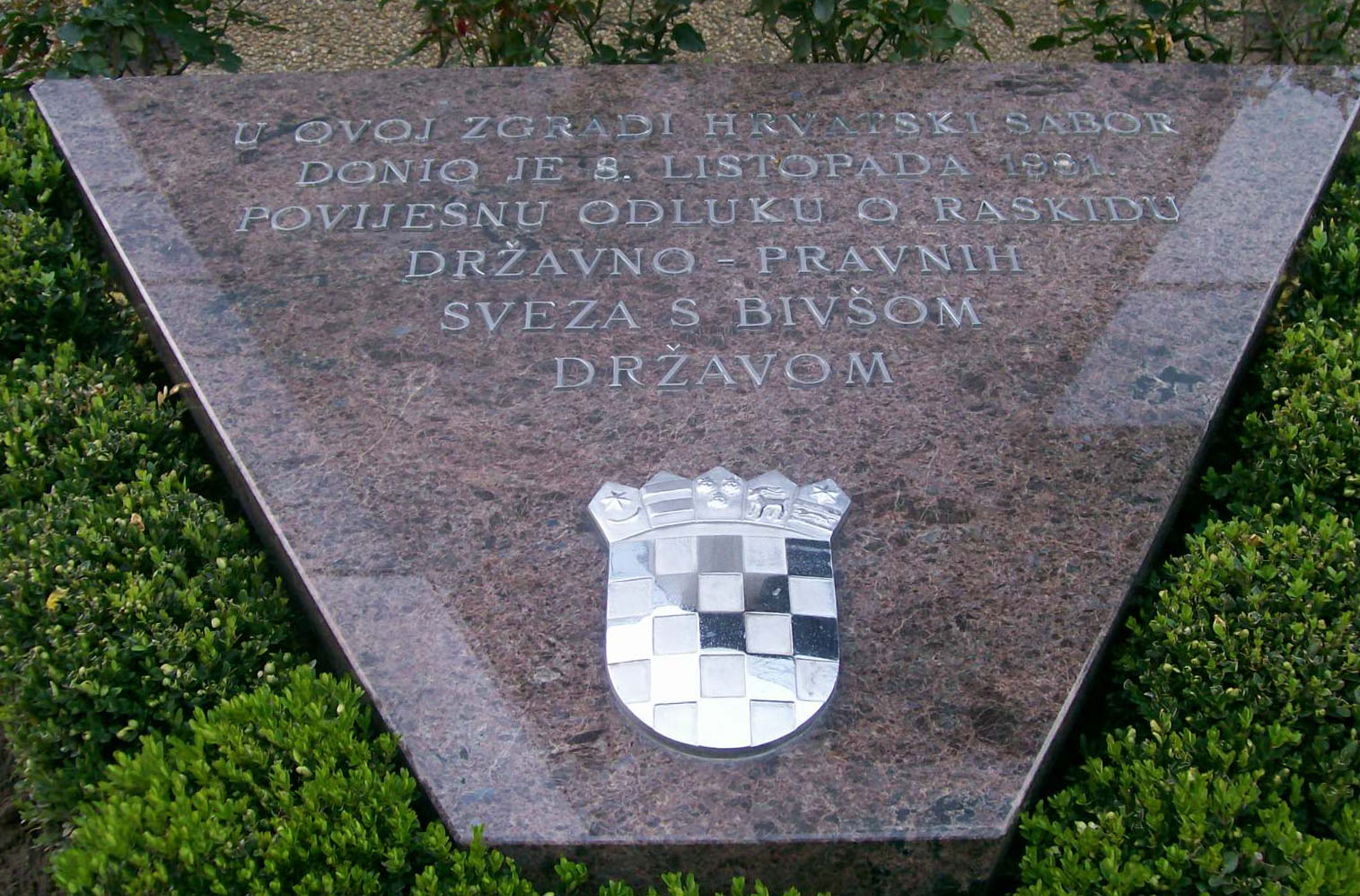
- The memorial plaque in front of the building where independence was proclaimed by the Sabor
- Observed by: Croatia
- Significance: The day when the Croatian Parliament proclaimed independence from Yugoslavia
- Celebrations: Laying of wreaths, banquets
- Date: 25 June
- Frequency: Annual

Independence Day (Croatian: Dan neovisnosti) is a memorial day in Croatia, marked yearly on 25 June that celebrates the decision of the Croatian Parliament to declare the independence of Croatia from the SFR Yugoslavia. From 2002 to 2019, the day was celebrated as a public holiday on 8 October; as of 2020 it is not considered a public holiday.

== History ==
The Croatian referendum on independence was held in May 1991, with 93% of voters supporting independence. On 25 June, the Croatian Parliament (Sabor) proclaimed Croatian independence. Seven days later, on 7 July, Croatia and Slovenia both signed the Brioni Declaration, in which the two countries agreed to suspend all declarations and acts passed by the Croatian and Slovenian parliaments related to those states' secession from Yugoslavia for a period of three months. During that time, the Croatian War of Independence started.

On 8 October, the Croatian Parliament decided to end relations with Socialist Federal Republic of Yugoslavia, in the Decision to Sever All State and Legal Ties Between the Republic of Croatia and the Former Socialist Federal Republic of Yugoslavia. That session was not held in the Sabor Palace but instead in the basement of an INA building, because of the possibility of the repeat of an incident such as the bombing of Banski dvori.

The Government of Ivica Račan moved the Independence Day to 8 October in 2002, and 25 June was marked as a memorial day (working) under the name Statehood Day.

On 14 November 2019, the Croatian Parliament adopted a new law on holidays, and moved Independence Day back to 25 June. Previous date, 8 October, became a working memorial day under the name Day of the Croatian Parliament.

== Holiday ==
Independence Day was implemented by the Ivica Račan's government in 2001. It was celebrated for the first time in 2002. In November 2019, at the proposal of the Cabinet of Andrej Plenković, the Croatian Parliament adopted a new law on holidays, and moved the Independence Day to 25 June, formerly the Statehood Day. This day is no longer an off-day and a public holiday, but a memorial day.
