= Amar Alikadić =

Bosnian footballer

Personal information
- Full name: Amar Alikadić
- Date of birth: 15 June 1998 (age 28)
- Place of birth: Mostar, Bosnia and Herzegovina
- Height: 1.78 m (5 ft 10 in)
- Position: Defender

Youth career
- –2015: Velež Mostar

Senior career*
| Years | Team | Apps | (Gls) |
| 2015–2021 | Velež Mostar | 39 | (0) |
| 2020 | → Igman Konjic (loan) | 1 | (0) |
| 2020 | → Čapljina (loan) | 11 | (0) |
- * Club domestic league appearances and goals as of 14 November 2020

Amar Alikadić (born 15 June 1998) is a Bosnian professional footballer who plays as a defender.

== Club career ==
=== Velež Mostar ===
Alikadić is a product of the Velež Mostar youth academy. He made his professional debut for Velež on 27 February 2016, against Vitez in a Bosnian Premier League match. On 25 May 2019, Alikadić won the First League of FBiH with Velež after the club beat Bosna Visoko 0–2 away and got promoted to the Bosnian Premier League after getting relegated three years earlier.

In January 2020, Alikadić was sent on a six-month-long loan to First League of FBiH club Igman Konjic. In June 2020, he was sent on a loan to another First League of FBiH club, Čapljina.

== Honours ==
Velež Mostar

- First League of FBiH: 2018–19
