= Bisera Alikadić =

Bosnian poet (1939–2026)

- Born: 8 February 1939; Livno, Bosnia and Herzegovina
- Died: 6 October 2026 (aged 87); Sarajevo, Bosnia and Herzegovina
- Occupation: Poet

Bisera Alikadić (8 February 1939 – 6 October 2026) was a Bosnian poet and author, best known best for her work Larva and Krug. She mostly wrote romance novels as well as children's books. She was one of the first Bosnian women to publish romance novels. Her books Grad hrabrost (English: The City of Courage) and Knjiga vremena (English: Book of Time) express the city of Sarajevo's struggle during the Bosnian War of the 1990s.

== Life and career ==
Alikadić was born in the village Podhum near Livno, Bosnia and Herzegovina. She was a member of the Writers' Association of Bosnia and Herzegovina. Her books and poems have been translated into English, German, French, Macedonian, Albanian, Turkish and Italian.

On 4 December 2014, a "literary portrait" of Alikadić was inducted into the Museum of Literature and Performing Arts of Bosnia and Herzegovina.

Alimadić died on 6 October 2026, at the age of 87.

== Bibliography ==
Poetry

- "Intonacije" (with Simha Kabiljo and Tomislav Šipovac named "Minijature"), Džepna knjiga, Sarajevo, 1959
- "Noć i ćilibar", Svjetlost, Sarajevo, 1972
- "Kapi i Mahovina", Veselin Masleša, Sarajevo, 1975
- "Drhtaj vučice", Svjetlost, Sarajevo, 1981
- "Raspeće", Veselin Masleša, Sarajevo, 1986
- "Pjesme" (izbor), Veselin Masleša, Sarajevo, 1988
- "Dok jesam ciganka", Oslobođenje Public, Sarajevo, 1991
- "Ne predajem se", Biblioteka Egzil-abc, Ljubljana, 1994
- "Grad hrabrost", "City of courage", bilingual, Međunarodni centar za mir, Sarajevo, 1995
- "Pjesme ljestvice", (pjesme za djecu), Međunarodni centar za mir, Sarajevo, 1996
- "Knjiga vremena", Sarajevo-Publishing, Sarajevo, 1999
- "Voz do neba", (children poetry), Bosanska riječ, Sarajevo, 2000
- "Ludi kamen", Vrijeme, Zenica, 2002

Prose

- "Larva", roman, Prva književna komuna, Mostar, 1974
- "Krug", roman, Prva književna komuna, Mostar, 1983
- "Kraljica iz dvorišta", stories for children, Svjetlost, Sarajevo, 1983, 1995
- "Tačkasti padobran", stories for children, Oslobođenje Public, Sarajevo 1991
- "Sarajevska ljubavna priča", novela, Biblioteka Egzil-abc, Ljubljana, 1996

== Awards ==
Some of the honors she received for her work include:

- "Orden rada sa srebrnim vijencem", ("Order of Labour with Golden Wreath") in 1983
- "Zlatni broš za umjetnost", ("Golden brooch for art") in 1999 by magazine "Žena 21" (Woman 21)
- "Skender Kulenović" in 2003
