= Gorice, Brčko =

Gorice Горице
- Village
- Location within Bosnia and Herzegovina
- Coordinates: 44°54′55″N 18°44′19″E
- Country: Bosnia and Herzegovina
- Entity: Brčko District

Area
  - Total: 3.58 sq mi (9.28 km^{2})

Population (2013)
  - Total: 654
  - Density: 183/sq mi (70.5/km^{2})
- Time zone: UTC+1 (CET)
  - Summer (DST): UTC+2 (CEST)

Gorice (Serbian Cyrillic: Горице) is a village in the municipality of Brčko, Bosnia and Herzegovina. The village lies on the Sava river, which here marks the international border with Croatia, with the village of Rajevo Selo on the other bank of the river.

== History ==
=== 2026 helicopter crash ===
On October 29, 2026, a Boeing CH-47 Chinook operated by the Italian Army crashed in the village during routine training as part of Operation Althea. Four of the 15 people onboard were killed while the remaining 11 were all injured.

== Demographics ==
According to the 2013 census, its population was 654.

Ethnicity in 2013
Ethnicity	Number	Percentage
Serbs	403	61.6%
Croats	244	37.3%
Bosniaks	1	0.2%
other/undeclared	6	0.9%
Total	654	100%
