= Peace plans proposed before and during the Bosnian War =

Four major international peace plans were proposed before and during the Bosnian War by the European Community (EC) and United Nations (UN) diplomats before the conflict was settled by the Dayton Agreement in 1995.

== Background ==
The Bosnian War, which lasted from 1992 to 1995, was fought among its three main ethnicities: the Muslim Bosniaks, Catholic Croats, and Orthodox Serbs. Whilst the Bosniak plurality had sought a nation state across all ethnic lines, the Croats had created an autonomous community that functioned independently of central Bosnian rule, and the Serbs declared independence for the region's eastern and northern regions relevant to the Serb population. All peace plans were proposed with the view to observing Bosnia and Herzegovina as a sovereign state entire of its territorial integrity and without an imbalance of greater devolution and autonomy awarded to any community or region.

== Carrington–Cutileiro plan ==
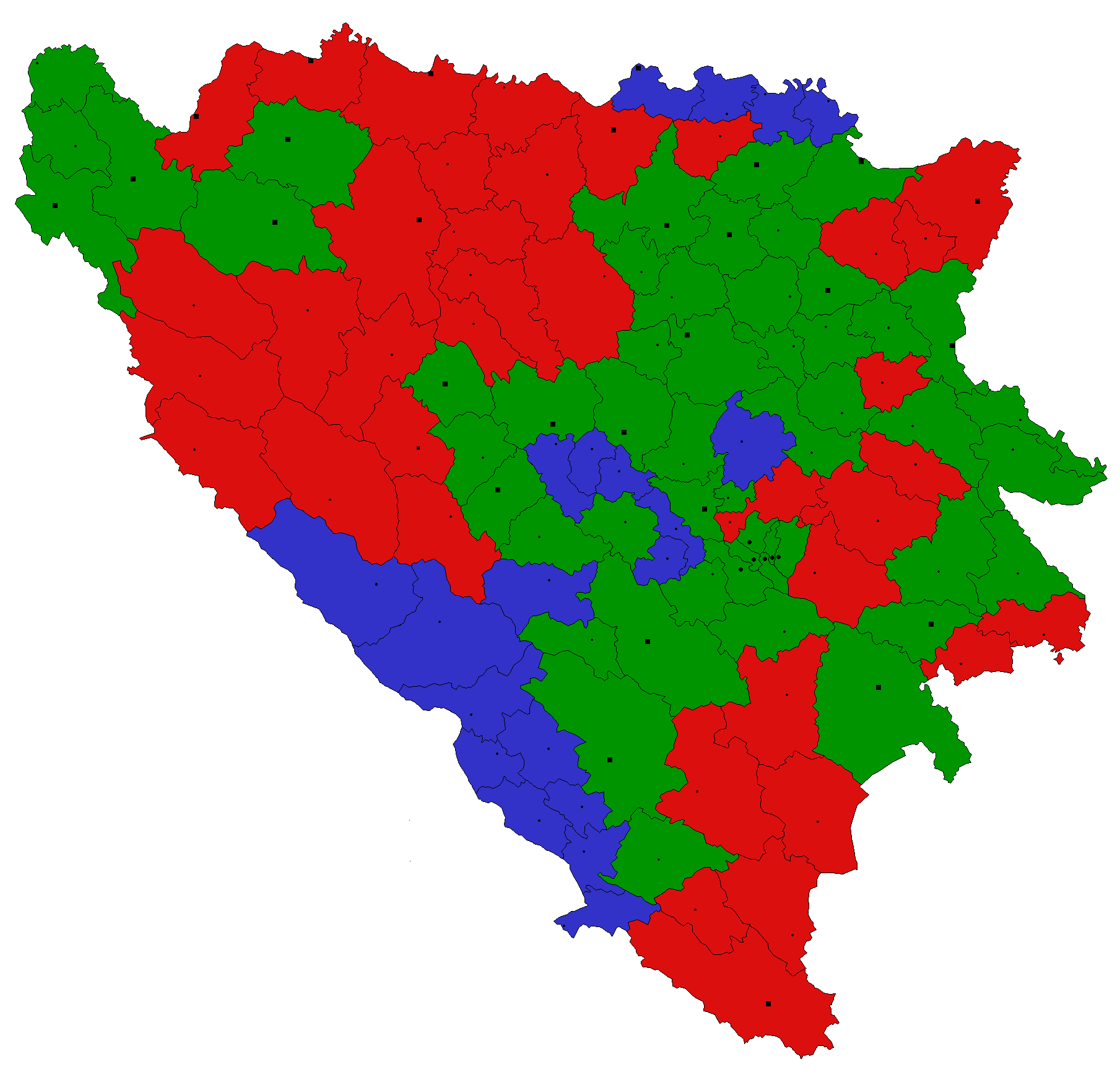
First iteration of the Carrington-Cutileiro Peace Plan
Bosniak cantons
Serb cantons
Croat cantons

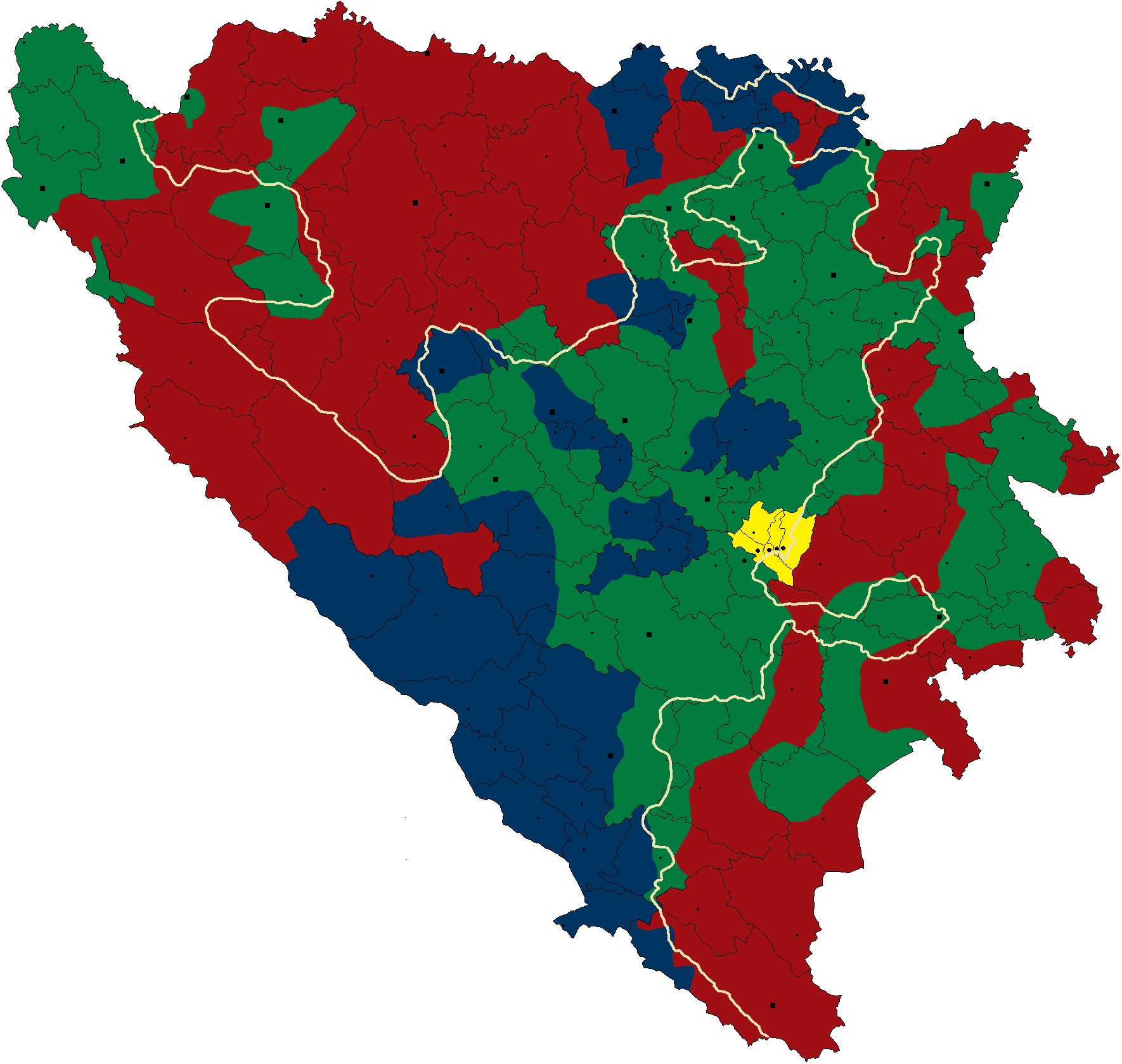
Second iteration of the Carrington-Cutileiro Peace Plan
Bosniak cantons
Serb cantons
Croat cantons
Sarajevo district
Dayton Agreement border

The original Carrington–Cutileiro peace plan, named for its authors Lord Carrington and Portuguese ambassador José Cutileiro, resulted from the EC Peace Conference held in February 1992 in an attempt to prevent Bosnia-Herzegovina sliding into war. It was also referred to as the Lisbon Agreement (Serbo-Croatian: Lisabonski sporazum). It proposed ethnic power-sharing on all administrative levels and the devolution of central government to local ethnic communities. However, all Bosnia-Herzegovina's districts would be classified as Bosniak, Serb or Croat under the plan, even where no ethnic majority was evident. In later negotiations, there were compromises about changing district borders. On 3 March 1992, Bosnia and Herzegovina was declared independent following a referendum held days earlier on February 29 and 1 March.

On 11 March 1992, the Assembly of the Serb People of Republika Srpska (the self-proclaimed parliament of the Bosnian Serbs) unanimously rejected the original peace plan putting forth their own map which claimed almost two thirds of Bosnia's territory, with a series of ethnically split cities and isolated enclaves and leaving the Croats and Bosniaks with a disjointed strip of land in the centre of the republic. That plan was rejected by Cutileiro. However, he put forth a revised draft of the original which stated that the three constituent units would be “based on national principles and taking into account economic, geographic, and other criteria.”

On 18 March 1992, all three sides agreed to the text of an agreement, officially called the “Statement of Principles”; Alija Izetbegović for the Party of Democratic Action (SDA), Radovan Karadžić for the Serb Democratic Party (SDS) and Mate Boban for the Croatian Democratic Union of Bosnia and Herzegovina (HDZ BiH). The plan concerned the constitutional arrangements of an independent Bosnia and Herzegovina and provisionally assigned each of the 109 municipalities to one of the three ethnic sides, with possible changes to the borders of the ethnic “constituent units” to be made by a working group. The allocation of the municipalities was mostly based on the results of the 1991 population census that was completed a year before the signing of the agreement. The agreement stipulated that the Bosniak and Serb cantons would each have covered 44% of the country's territory, with the Croat canton covering the remaining 12%.

While SDA and HDZ appeared to have renounced their agreement to the plan in the following week, all sides recommitted to the plan when further negotiations between the parties took place on 30 and 31 March 1992 in Brussels, at which some details were finalised. However, following the independence referendum on 1 March armed conflict between the ethnic groups had broken out, and on 1 April, Serb paramilitary forces seized control of Bijeljina in what has come to be known as the Bijeljina massacre. An additional round of negotiations had been scheduled for 10–12 April in Sarajevo, but in light of the changed circumstances, Cutileiro focused entirely on ceasefire negotiations rather than the original plan.

On 6 April 1992, the United States and the European Community recognised Bosnia and Herzegovina as an independent state.

== Vance–Owen Peace Plan ==
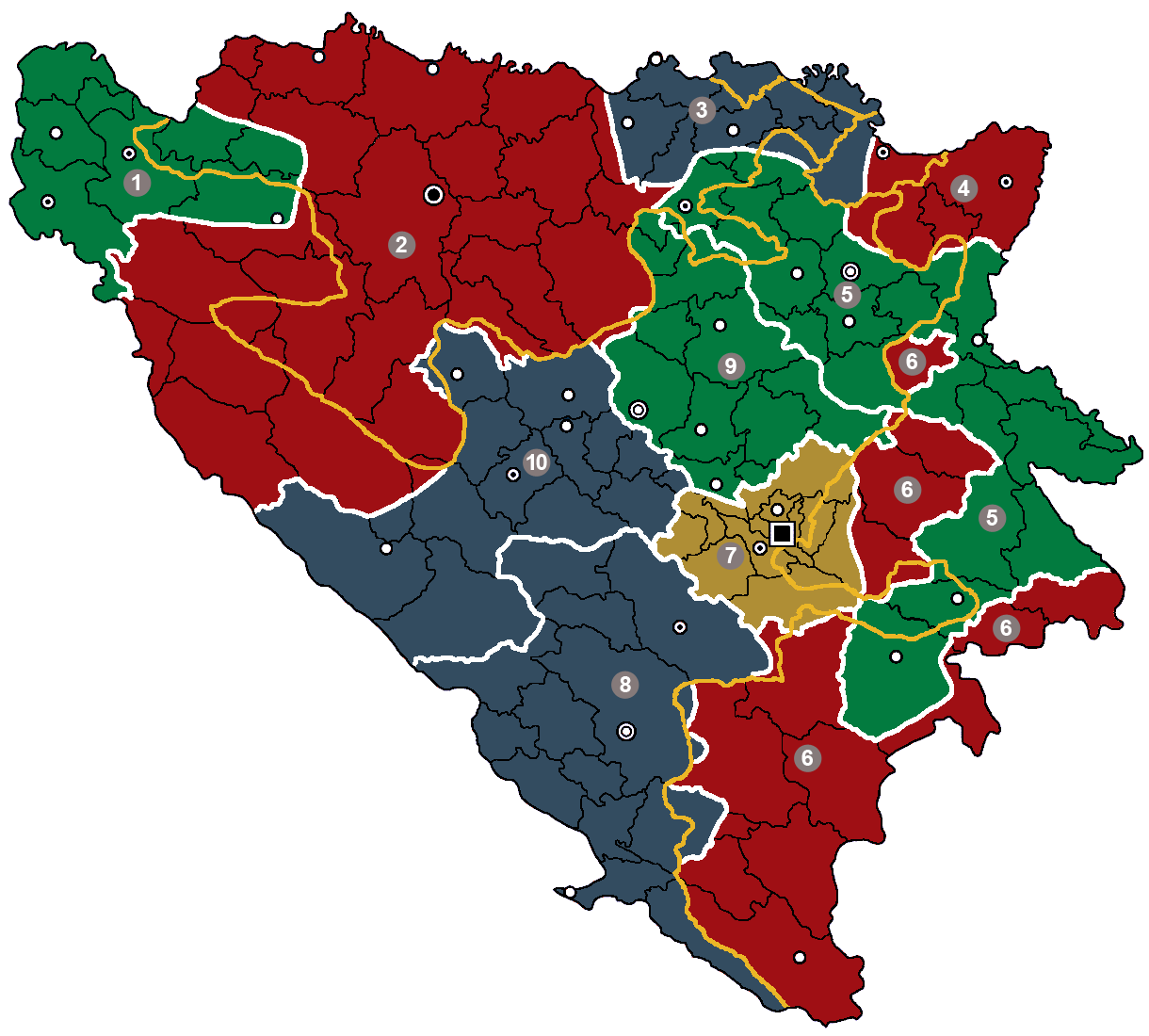
First version of the Vance-Owen plan, which would have established 10 provinces Bosniak province Croat province Serb province Sarajevo district Dayton Agreement border

In early January 1993, the UN Special Envoy Cyrus Vance and EC representative Lord Owen began negotiating a peace proposal with the leaders of Bosnia's warring factions. The proposal, which became known as the "Vance-Owen peace plan", involved the division of Bosnia into ten semi-autonomous regions and received the backing of the UN. The President of the Republika Srpska, Radovan Karadžić, signed the plan on 30 April. However, it was rejected by the National Assembly of Republika Srpska on 6 May, and subsequently referred to a referendum. The plan was rejected by 96% of voters, although mediators referred to the referendum as a "sham". On 18 June, Lord Owen declared that the plan was "dead".

Given the pace at which territorial division, fragmentation and ethnic cleansing had occurred, the plan was already obsolete by the time it was announced. It became the last proposal that sought to salvage a mixed, united Bosnia-Herzegovina; subsequent proposals either re-enforced or contained elements of partition of Bosnia and Herzegovina.

On 1 April, Cyrus Vance announced his resignation as Special Envoy to the UN Secretary-General. He was replaced by Norwegian Foreign Minister Thorvald Stoltenberg on 1 May.

The Vance–Owen plan was a roughly sketched map, and it did not establish the definitive outline of the 10 cantons and depended on final negotiations between the three ethnic groups taking place.

== Owen–Stoltenberg plan ==
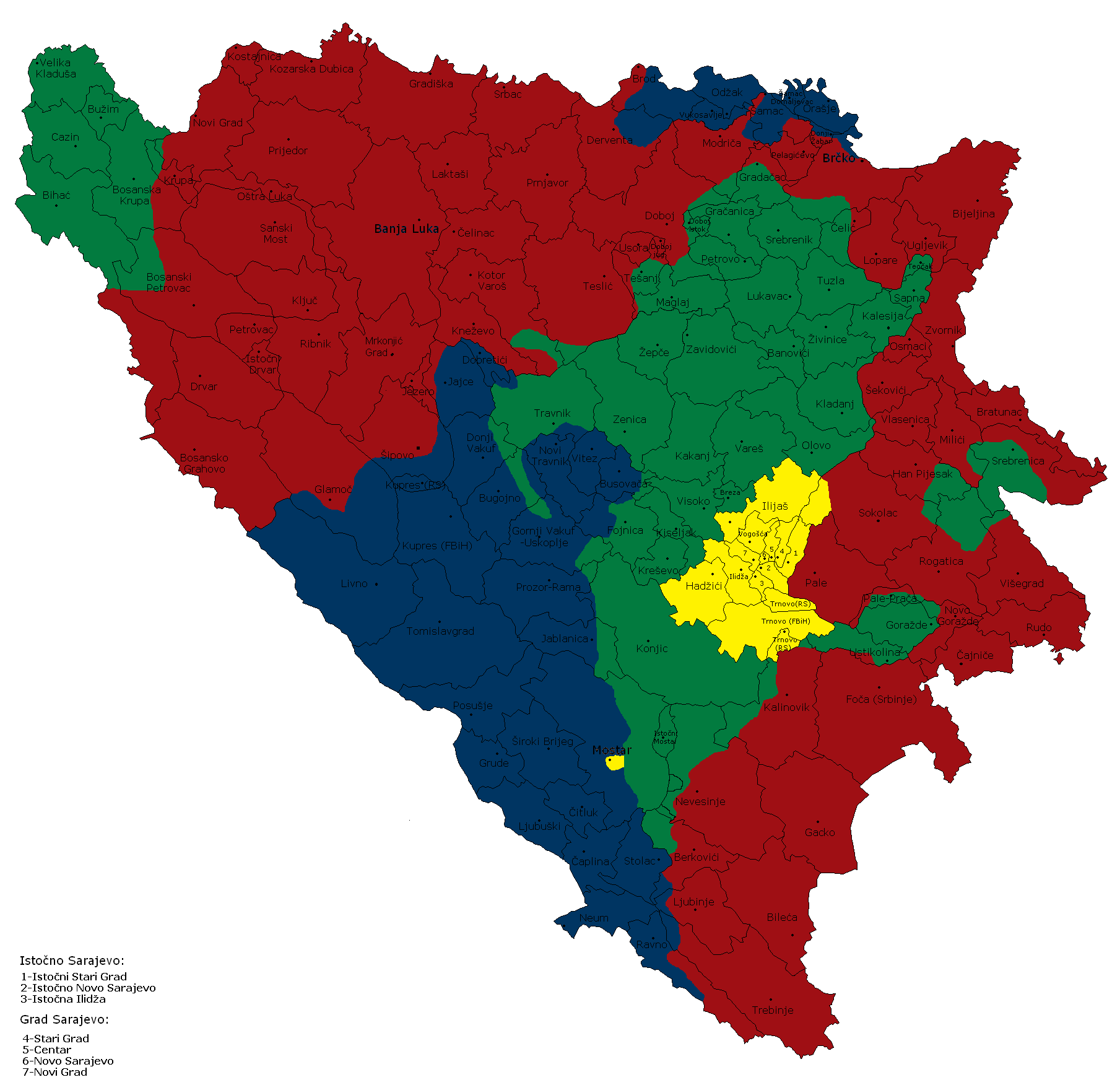
Owen–Stoltenberg plan

In late July, representatives of Bosnia-Herzegovina's three warring factions entered into a new round of negotiations. On 20 August, the U.N. mediators Thorvald Stoltenberg and David Owen unveiled a map that would partition Bosnia into a union of three ethnic republics, in which Bosnian Serb forces would be given 53 percent of Bosnia-Herzegovina's territory, Muslims would be allotted 30 percent and Bosnian-Herzegovina Croats would receive 17 percent. On 28 August, in accordance with the Owen–Stoltenberg peace proposal, the Croatian Republic of Herzeg-Bosnia was proclaimed in Grude as a "republic of the Croats in Bosnia and Herzegovina". On 29 August 1993 the Bosniak side rejected the plan.

== Contact Group plan ==
Between February and October 1994, the Contact Group (U.S., Russia, France, Britain, and Germany) made steady progress towards a negotiated settlement of the conflict in Bosnia-Herzegovina. This was known as a Contact Group plan, and a heavy pressure was put on Bosnian Serbs to accept the plan when Federal Republic of Yugoslavia imposed an embargo on Drina river. It was also rejected in a referendum held on 28 August 1994.

During this period, the conflict between Croats and Bosniaks came to an end in March 1994, as the two factions settled their differences in the Washington Agreement signed in Washington, D.C., and Vienna.

== Other plans by Bosnian actors ==
There were also Bosniak, Croat and Serb proposals for the reorganisation of Bosnia.

- As ethnic tensions grew, one of the first Muslim proposals came in June 1991. The agreement proposed by Adil Zulfikarpašić and Muhamed Filipović was negotiated with Radovan Karadžić and called for the establishment of three entities (Muslim, Serb and Croat), each composed of two or three non-contiguous territories, with Bosnia remaining in a newly federalized Yugoslavia.
- Another joint proposal by the Bosniak Party of Democratic Action (SDA) and the Croatian Democratic Union of Bosnia and Herzegovina (HDZ BiH) political parties was announced in August 1992. It called for establishing 12 cantons of Bosnia and Herzegovina, with autonomous rights.
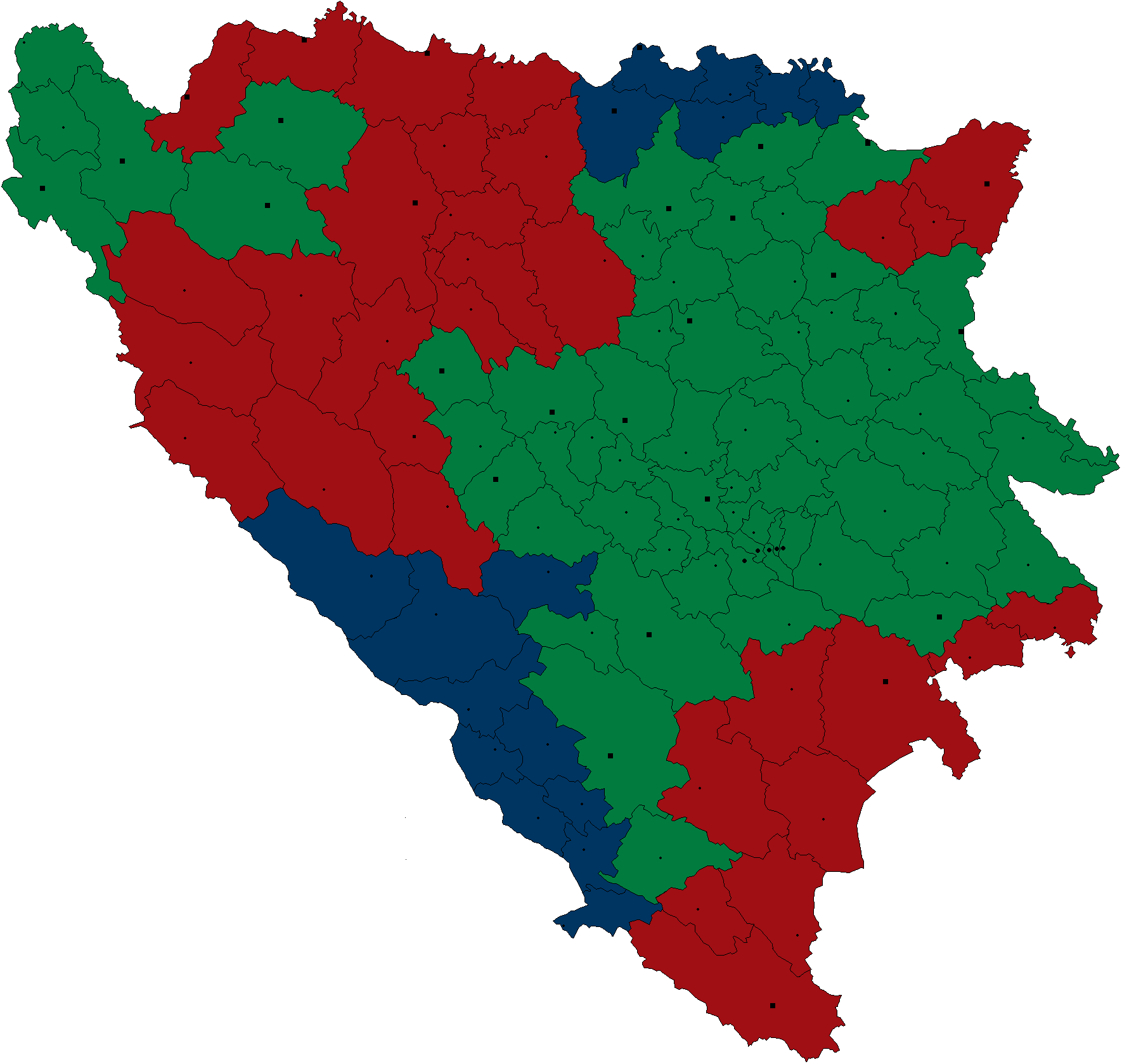
Map of the first Bosniak proposal on federalisation of Bosnia and Herzegovina, from 25 June 1991.

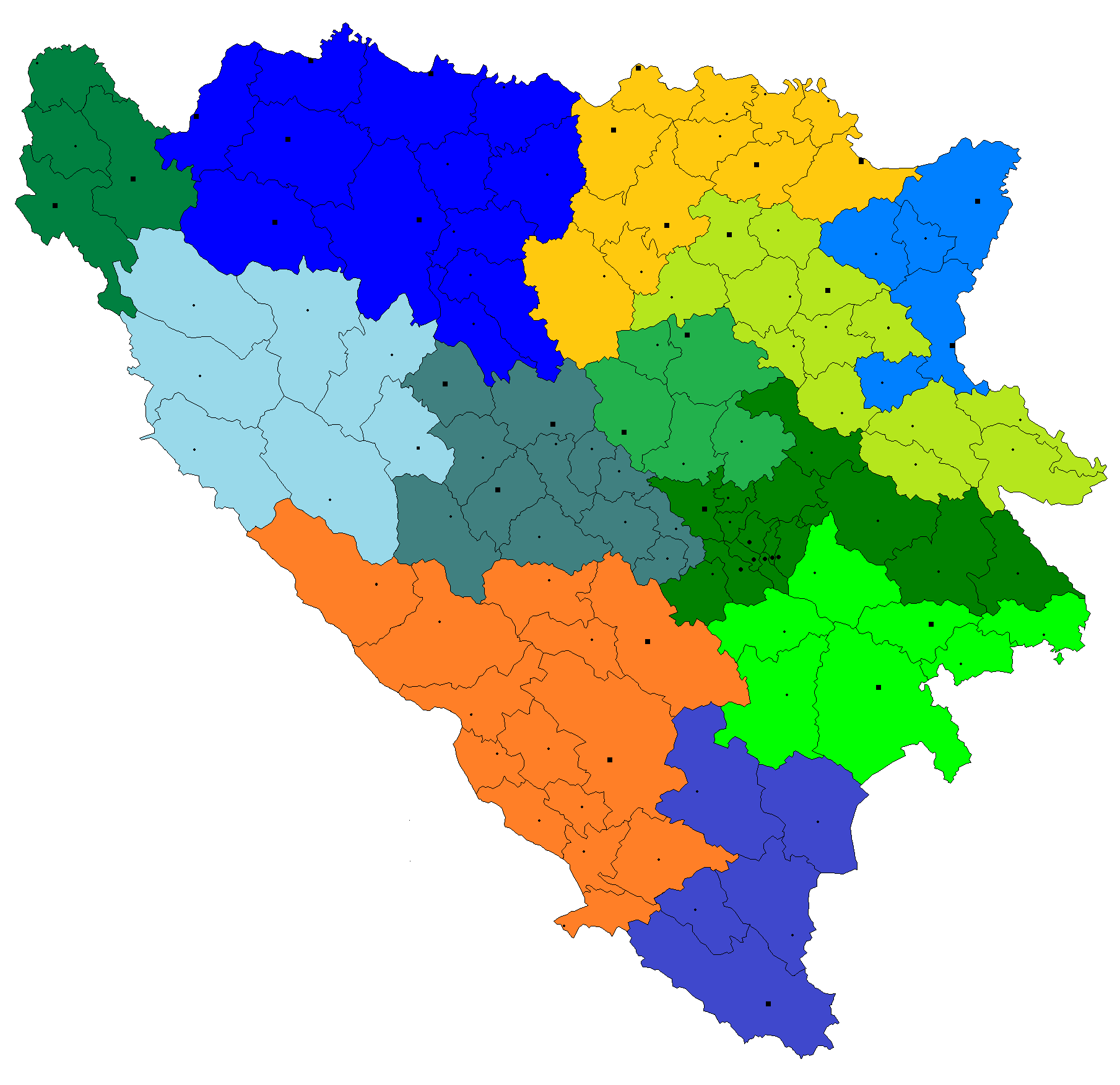
Bosniak SDA and Croat HDZ BiH joint proposal of 12 cantons, from August 1992.

== See also ==
- Partition of Bosnia and Herzegovina
- Inter-Entity Boundary Line
- Dayton Peace Accords
- Croat entity in Bosnia and Herzegovina
- Proposed secession of Republika Srpska

== Sources ==
- Atiyas, N.B., 1995. Mediating regional conflicts and negotiating flexibility: Peace efforts in Bosnia-Herzegovina. The Annals of the American Academy of Political and Social Science, 542(1), pp. 185–201.
- Central Intelligence Agency, Office of Russian and European Analysis (2002). Balkan Battlegrounds: A Military History of the Yugoslav Conflict, 1990–1995, Volume 1. Washington, D.C.: Central Intelligence Agency. ISBN 978-0-16-066472-4.
- Goodby, J.E., 1996. When war won out: Bosnian peace plans before Dayton. International Negotiation, 1(3), pp. 501–523.
- Klemenčić, Mladen; Pratt, Martin; Schofield, Clive H. (1994). Territorial Proposals for the Settlement of the War in Bosnia-Hercegovina. IBRU. ISBN 9781897643150. Archived from the original on 2020-03-17.
- Leigh-Phippard, H., 1998. The Contact Group on (and in) Bosnia: an exercise in conflict mediation?. International Journal, 53(2), pp. 306–324.
- Marijan, Davor (2004). "Expert Opinion: On the War Connections of Croatia and Bosnia and Herzegovina (1991 – 1995)". Journal of Contemporary History. 36. Zagreb, Croatia: Croatian Institute of History: 249–289. Archived from the original on 2020-01-02.
- Myers, Linnet (6 May 1993). "Bosnian Serbs Spurn Un Pact, Set Referendum". Chicago Tribune. Archived from the original on 30 June 2015.
- Tanner, Marcus (2001). Croatia: A Nation Forged in War. New Haven: Yale University Press. ISBN 978-0-300-09125-0.
- Trbovich, Ana S. (2008). A Legal Geography of Yugoslavia's Disintegration. Oxford University Press, US. ISBN 978-0-19-533343-5.
- Tomas, Mario; Nazor, Ante (October 2013). "Prikaz i analiza borbi na bosanskoposavskom bojištu 1992" [Analysis of the Military Conflict on the Bosnian-Posavina Battlefront in 1992]. Scrinia Slavonica. 13 (1): 277–315. ISSN 1848-9109.
