= Emilija Soklič =

Slovene engineer and filmmaker (1918–2025)

- Born: 11 November 1918
- Died: 30 December 2025 (aged 107)
- Citizenship: Slovenia
- Occupations: Electrical engineer, audio engineer
- Known for: Audio engineer for early Slovene film production, innovator

Emilija Soklič (11 November 1918 – 30 December 2025) was a Slovene electrical engineer known as one of the first professional filmmakers in Slovenia, whose technical support was instrumental for the early Slovene film production, including the first sound feature On Our Own Land (1948). In collaboration with Rudi Omota, she developed several innovations for sound recording.

== Early life and education ==
Soklič was born in Switzerland to a Bosnian father and a Swiss mother of French-German heritage. She had two sisters. At age five, in 1923, the family decided to move to Ljubljana where she grew up. She developed an interest in technology at a young age and often helped her father, also an electrical engineer, at work in the family business. She later enrolled in the Technical high school in Ljubljana as one of the first female students.

== Work ==
Soon after World War II, in 1946, the director Marjan Pengov invited her to become head of the technical department of the Triglav Film production company. She was first tasked with setting up the electrical equipment in the company's new studio in Trnovo, obtained in Spring 1947. In her role, she later oversaw the acquisition of Vinten and Newall 35 mm cameras, which were used for nearly all Slovene film production in subsequent years. Soklič collaborated on the production of a series of short films, followed by the first sound feature On Our Own Land (Na svoji zemlji, 1948) and later other early feature films, such as Kekec (1951). In parallel, she lectured on lighting technology at the Technical high school.

In the early 1950s, Soklič started working with the engineer Rudi Omota; together, they first developed magnetic sound encoding, a milestone in national film production in itself, which also paved the way for co-productions with foreign studios where it was already standard. They both left Triglav Film in 1955 and started working at the Institute for Telecommunications (Inštitut za elektrozveze, later part of Iskra), where they developed devices for sound recording, editing, and playback. The Model 4103 mixing console they built for Radio Slovenia in 1981 featured integrated circuits and parametric filters; it is now in the collection of the Technical Museum of Slovenia.

== Death ==
Soklič died on 30 December 2025, at the age of 107.

== Awards ==
In 2021, Soklič was presented with the Badjura award for lifetime work in film.
