= Independence and Unity Day (Slovenia) =

Slovenian national holiday

- Date: 26 December
- Next time: 26 December 2025
- Frequency: annual

Independence and Unity Day (Slovene: Dan samostojnosti in enotnosti) is a Slovenian national holiday that occurs on every 26 December to commemorate the official proclamation of the Slovenian independence referendum on 26 December 1990. The referendum took place on 23 December that year. In it, 95% of the voters favoured the establishment of independent and sovereign nation. Between 1991 and 2005, the holiday used to be known simply as Independence Day. The current name was adopted in September 2005, following the proposal of the then-opposition Social Democrats, in order to emphasize the national consensus at the time of the 1990 referendum, which was supported by all political parties represented in the Assembly of the Socialist Republic of Slovenia at the time.

Independence and Unity Day is not to be confused with Slovenia's Statehood Day, which is celebrated each year on June 25, in honour of the declaration of Slovenian independence from Yugoslavia in 1991.

== Related articles ==
- Public holidays in Slovenia
