= Prešeren Day =

Slovenian public holiday

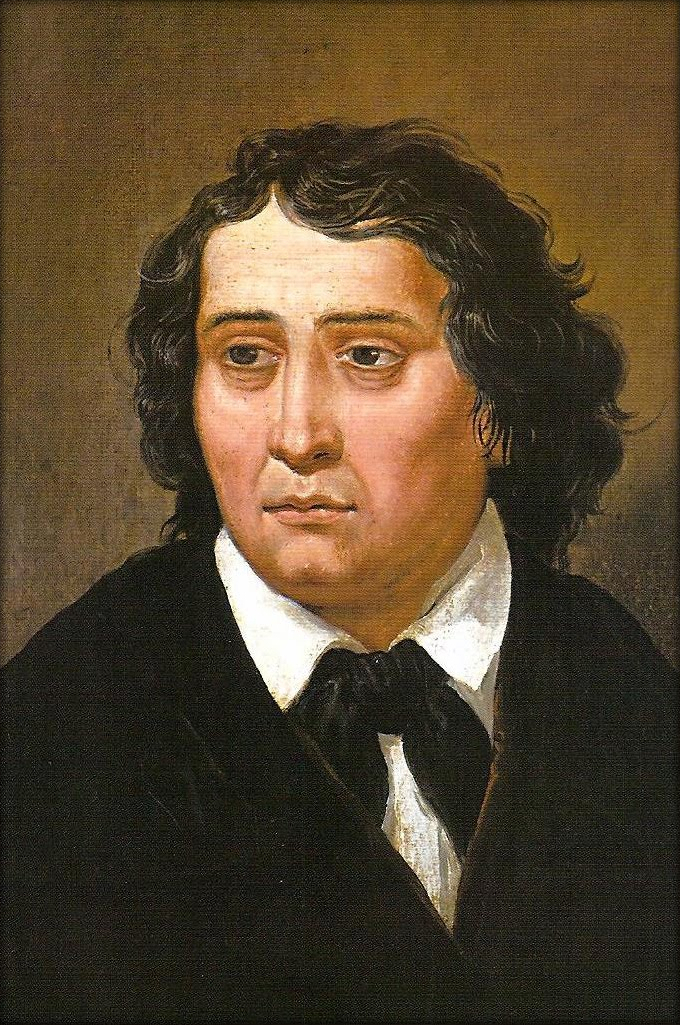
- Observed by: Slovenia
- Date: 8 February
- Next time: 8 February 2026
- Frequency: annual

Prešeren Day (Slovene: Prešernov dan), full name Prešeren Day, the Slovene Cultural Holiday (Slovene: Prešernov dan, slovenski kulturni praznik), is a public holiday celebrated in Slovenia on 8 February. It is marking the anniversary of the death of the Slovene national poet France Prešeren on 8 February 1849 and is the celebration of the Slovenian culture. It was established in 1945 to raise the cultural consciousness and the self-confidence of the Slovene nation, and declared a work-free day in 1991. On 7 February, the eve of the holiday, the Prešeren Awards and the Prešeren Fund Awards, the highest Slovenian recognitions for cultural achievements, are conferred. Prešeren Day continues to be one of the most widely celebrated Slovene holidays. During the holiday all state and municipal museums and galleries offer free entry, and various other cultural events are held. The holiday is celebrated not only in Slovenia, but also by Slovene communities all around the world.

== History ==
The anniversary of Prešeren's death first became a prominent date during World War II in 1941, when 7 February was celebrated as the day of all-Slavic unity. The proposal to celebrate 8 February as the Slovene cultural holiday was put forward in January 1945, during World War II, in Črnomelj by the Slovene Liberation Front's cultural worker Bogomil Gerlanc. It was officially proclaimed a cultural holiday with a decree passed by the Presidency of the Slovene National Liberation Council on 28 January 1945 and published in the newspaper Slovenski poročevalec on 1 February 1945. It remained a public holiday during the era of the Socialist Republic of Slovenia within the SFR Yugoslavia and was celebrated also by the Carinthian Slovenes and the Slovenes in Italy. It was marked with many cultural festivals and remembrances and with school excursions to culturally significant institutions.

The declaration of Prešeren Day as a work-free day in 1991 was opposed by many, claiming it would bring the banalisation of a holiday designed to be dedicated to cultural events. As a result, 3 December, the anniversary of the poet's birth, has also become widely celebrated as an alternative holiday. Today both days are almost equally celebrated, with no antagonism between the two, although only Prešeren Day in February is officially recognised as a national holiday. Since it became a work-free day, it has become even more highly valued.

== See also ==
- Holidays in Slovenia
