= Statehood Day (Bosnia and Herzegovina) =

National holiday

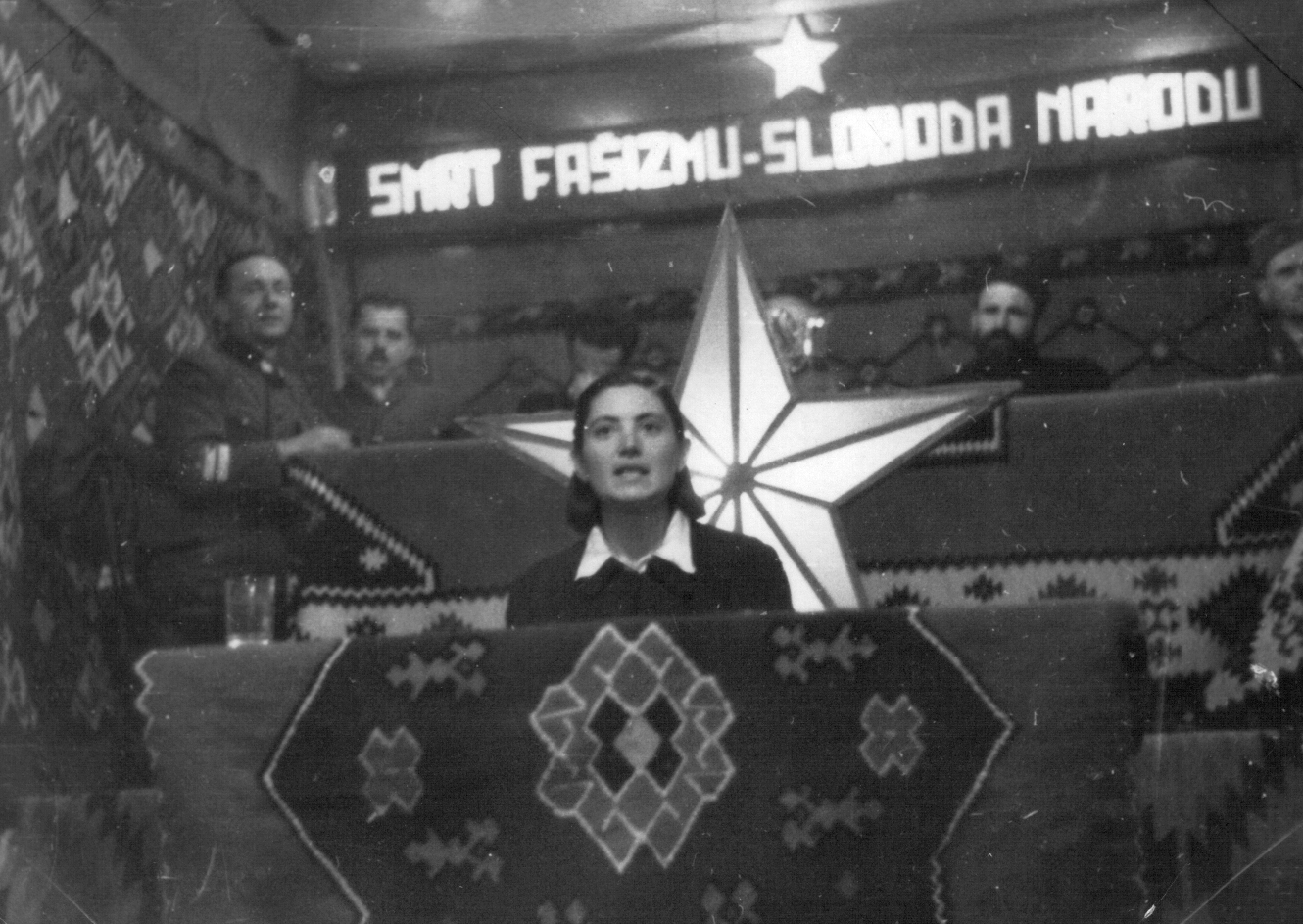
- Rada Vranješević speaking at the first ZAVNOBiH session
- Official name: Dan državnosti / Дан државности
- Observed by: Bosnia and Herzegovina
- Significance: Resolution of ZAVNOBiH
- Date: 25 November
- Next time: 25 November 2026
- Frequency: Annual

Statehood Day (Bosnian: Dan državnosti, Дан државности) is a holiday celebrated in Bosnia and Herzegovina that occurs every year on 25 November. On that day in 1943, at the first session of the State Anti-fascist Council for the National Liberation of Bosnia and Herzegovina (ZAVNOBiH) in Mrkonjić Grad, the "Resolution of ZAVNOBiH" was adopted. The resolution expressed the determination of the peoples of Bosnia and Herzegovina that their country shall be a brotherly community in which full equality of all its nationalities was to be ensured, that their republic was to be on equal footing with other republics in the Yugoslav federation, and that Bosnia and Herzegovina would reclaim its historical borders.

== History ==
The Law on the Proclamation of 25 November as the Statehood Day of the former Republic of Bosnia and Herzegovina (Official Gazette of R B&H, No. 9/95) stipulates that November 25 is Bosnia and Herzegovina's Statehood Day but this directive is, in practice, ignored by the authorities in the Republika Srpska entity.

Statehood Day should not be confused with Independence Day, which is held each year on 1 March in honor of the 1992 referendum that indicated that a majority of Bosniaks and Bosnian Croats were in favor of becoming a sovereign nation. The total turnout of voters was 63.73%, 99.7% of whom voted for independence while the majority of the Bosnian Serb population boycotted the referendum.

== See also ==
- Independence Day (Bosnia and Herzegovina)
- Statehood Day (disambiguation) in other countries
- Dan državnosti (disambiguation) in other Balkan akin language speaking countries
- History of Bosnia and Herzegovina
- History of Yugoslavia
