= Statehood Day (Slovenia) =

Public holiday commemorating Slovenia's independence from Yugoslavia (25 June 1991)

- Official name: Slovene: dan državnosti
- Observed by: Slovenia
- Significance: The day when the Slovenian parliament proclaimed independence from Yugoslavia
- Date: 25 June
- Next time: 25 June 2027
- Frequency: annual

Statehood Day (Slovene: Dan državnosti) is a holiday that occurs on every 25 June in Slovenia to commemorate the country's declaration of independence from Yugoslavia in 1991. Although the formal declaration of independence did not come until 26 June 1991, Statehood Day is considered to be 25 June since that was the date on which the initial acts regarding independence were passed and Slovenia became independent. Slovenia's declaration jump-started the Ten-Day War with Yugoslavia, which it eventually won.

Statehood Day is not to be confused with Slovenia's Independence and Unity Day, which is celebrated each year on 26 December in honour of 26 December 1990 official proclamation of the results of the plebiscite held three days earlier in which 95.71% of all Slovenian voters were in favor of Slovenia becoming a sovereign nation.

Croatia's Independence Day is celebrated on the same day, as the two countries declared their statehood and recognized each other's sovereignty on the same day. That date also used to mark Croatia's Statehood day until 2019.

== See also ==
- Statehood Day (disambiguation) in other countries
- Holidays in Slovenia
- History of Slovenia
- Breakup of Yugoslavia
