= Independence Day (Bosnia and Herzegovina) =

National holiday in Bosnia and Herzegovina

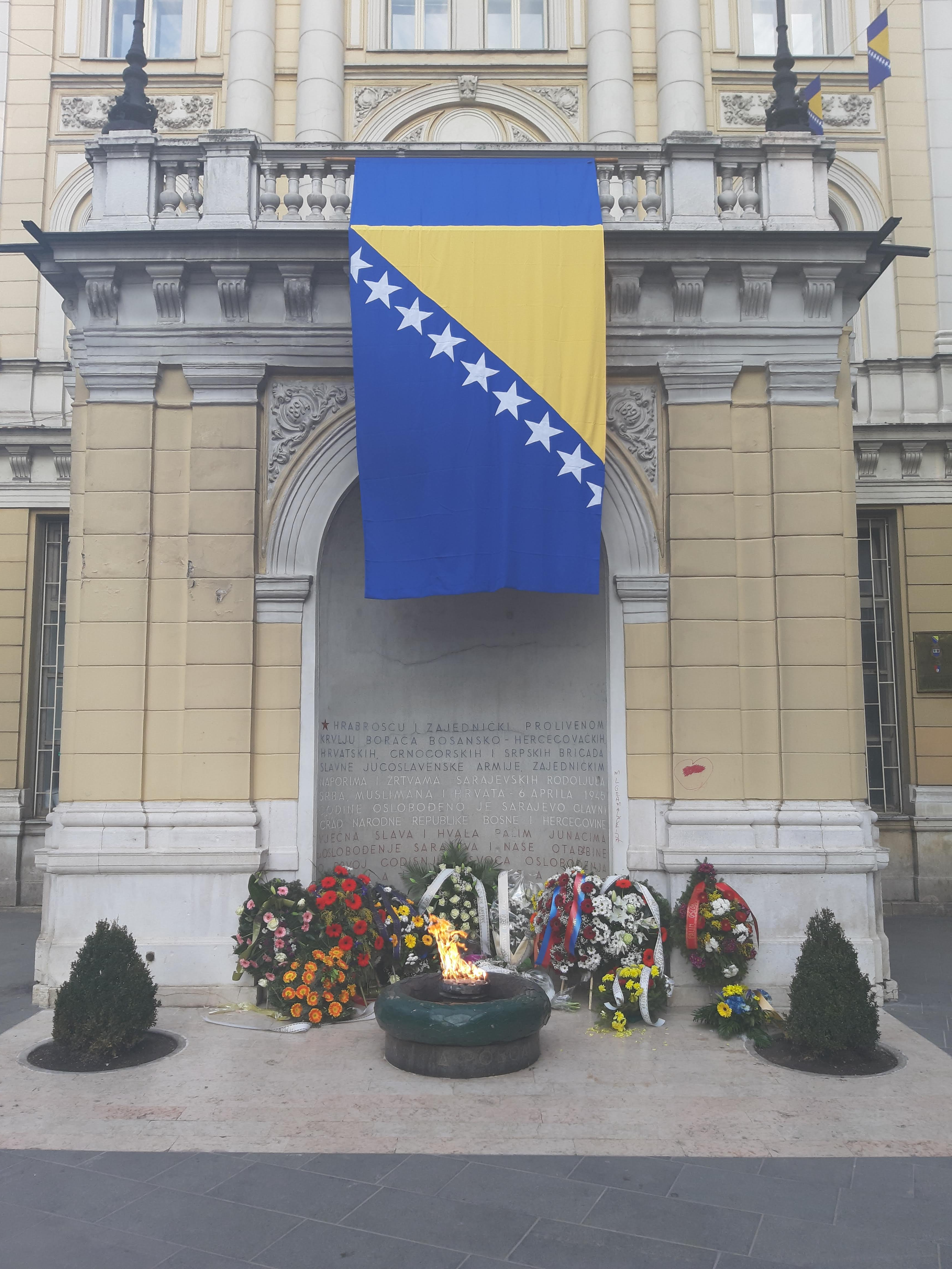
- The eternal flame in Sarajevo with the national flag on Independence Day, 2019
- Official name: Independence Day of Bosnia and Herzegovina
- Observed by: Federation of Bosnia and Herzegovina
- Significance: Commemorates the anniversary of the successful 1992 Bosnian independence referendum
- Date: 1 March
- Frequency: Annual

Independence Day (Bosnian: Dan nezavisnosti; Croatian: Dan neovisnosti; Serbian: Дан независности) is a public holiday observed in the Federation of Bosnia and Herzegovina, an entity of Bosnia and Herzegovina on 1 March to celebrate the independence of the then Republic of Bosnia and Herzegovina from the Socialist Federal Republic of Yugoslavia in 1992.

The other entity, Republika Srpska, marks 1 March as a day of grievance.

== History ==
Citizens of the Socialist Republic of Bosnia and Herzegovina, a constituent federal state of the Socialist Federal Republic of Yugoslavia, voted in an independence referendum held between 28 February and 1 March 1992. The referendum question was: "Are you in favour of a sovereign and independent Bosnia-Herzegovina, a state of equal citizens and nations of Muslims, Serbs, Croats and others who live in it?" Independence was strongly favoured by Muslims and Bosnian Croat voters, while majority of Bosnian Serbs boycotted it. Voter turnout was 63.6 per cent, of whom 99.7 per cent voted for the independence. However, the referendum failed to attain the constitutionally required two-thirds majority since only 64 per cent of eligible voters participated.

Nevertheless, the referendum results were accepted on 6 March by the Parliament of Bosnia and Herzegovina. On 7 April 1992, the European Community recognized Bosnia and Herzegovina as an independent state. The Parliament of the Federation of Bosnia and Herzegovina (the parliament of the Bosniak–Croat Federation) decided on 28 February 1995 that 1 March would be the Independence Day of Bosnia and Herzegovina and a national holiday. Independence Day was celebrated for the first time on 1 March 1995.

== Observance ==
The Independence Day of Bosnia and Herzegovina is celebrated only in the Federation of Bosnia and Herzegovina, while Republika Srpska has its own Independence Day on 9 January. President of Republika Srpska Milorad Dodik said that Independence Day "is a holiday of the Bosniak people and we do not dispute it, but it is not a holiday celebrated in the Republika Srpska". Most Bosnian Serbs instead associate the date with the 1 March 1992 attack on a Serb wedding procession in Sarajevo which resulted in the death of the groom's father and the wounding of a Serbian Orthodox priest, whom most Bosnian Serbs consider to have been the first casualties of the Bosnian War.
