= 2021 in Slovenia =

- Decades: 2000s; 2010s; 2020s
- See also: Other events of 2021; Timeline of Slovenian history

Events in the year 2021 in Slovenia. The year was marked by the continuation of the COVID-19 pandemic in Slovenia.

== Incumbents ==
- President: Borut Pahor
- Prime Minister: Janez Janša

== Events ==
=== Ongoing ===
- COVID-19 pandemic in Slovenia

=== January ===
- January 15 - a ban on overtaking by heavy trucks in daytime comes in effect on the A1 motorway, the busiest road in the country.

=== February ===
- February 15 -
  - COVID-19 pandemic in Slovenia: due to gradual decline in the number of infections with the new coronavirus, the government eases certain restrictions of public life, such as the ban on crossing municipal borders.
  - prime minister Janša's government passes the parliamentary vote of no confidence over the handling of the COVID-19 pandemic.
- February 24 - skier Anamarija Lampič wins the small crystal globe as the overall 2020–21 FIS Cross-Country World Cup winner in women's Cross-Country sprint.
- February 26 - ski jumper Ema Klinec becomes the first Slovene female ski jumping world champion, winning the event at the 2021 FIS Nordic World Ski Championships in Oberstdorf.

=== March ===
- March 28 - ski jumper Nika Križnar wins the large crystal globe as the overall 2020–21 FIS women's Ski Jumping World Cup winner.

=== April ===
- April 1–11 - COVID-19 pandemic in Slovenia: to contain the latest increase in infections, the government imposes a partial lockdown, closing schools, banning sales of non-essential goods and services, most sport activities and collective religious events, and restricting travel across regional borders.

=== May ===
- May 5 - construction starts on the second line of Divača–Koper Railway.

=== June ===
- June 16 -
  - COVID-19 pandemic in Slovenia: the government decree proclaiming the COVID-19 epidemic expires after nearly 8 months, with some preventive measures remaining in place.
  - new passenger terminal opens at the Ljubljana Jože Pučnik Airport.

=== July ===
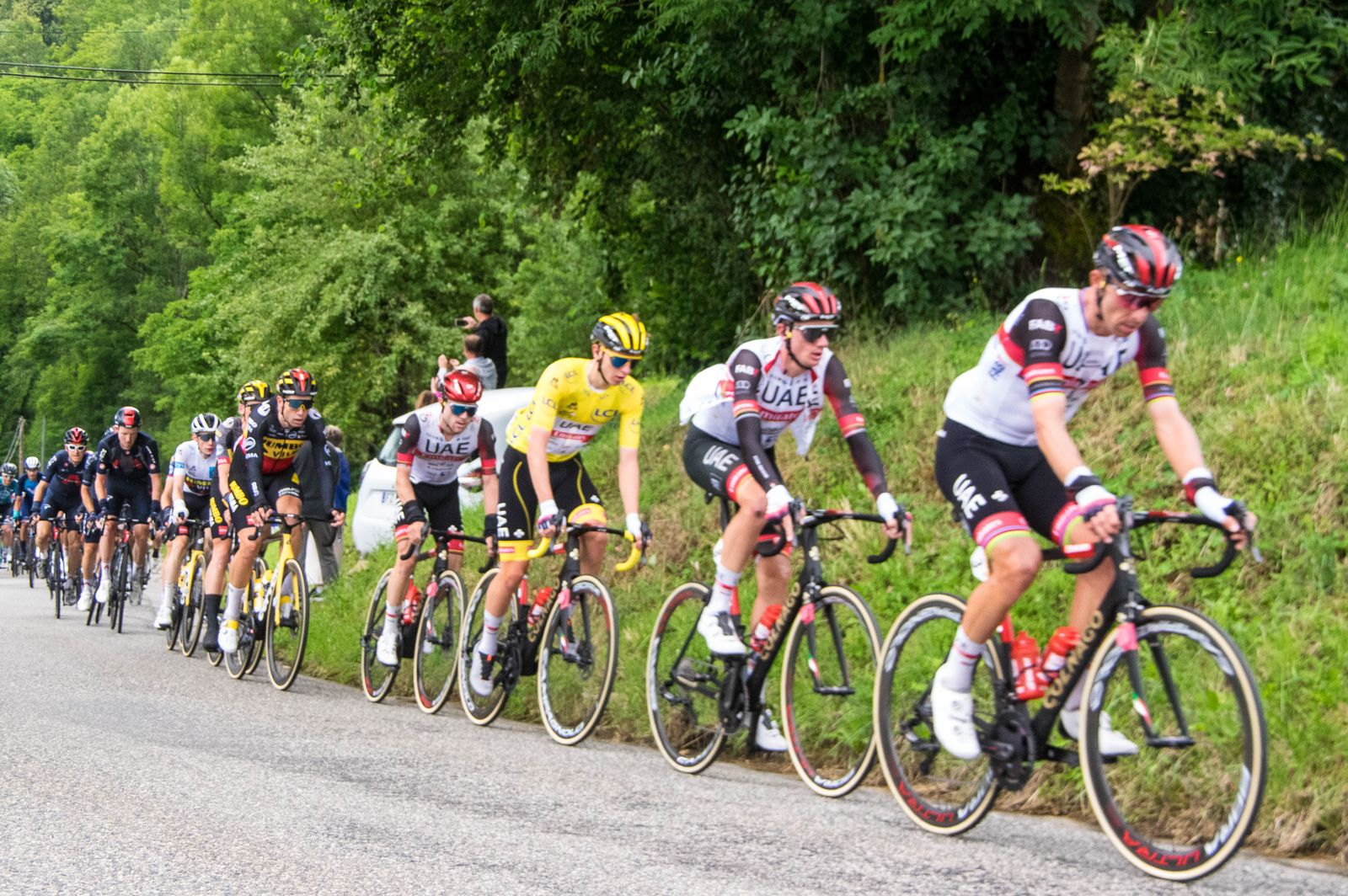
Tadej Pogačar in a yellow jersey at the Tour de France 2021, Stage 16 (13 July)

- July 1 - Slovenia takes over the presidency of the Council of the European Union for the second time since joining the Union.
- July 11 - voters reject the controversial proposal to amend the Slovenian Waters Act on a referendum.
- July 18 - cyclist Tadej Pogačar wins the prestigious Tour de France race for a second straight year.
- July 22 - COVID-19 pandemic in Slovenia: according to an estimate by the Jožef Stefan Institute, SARS-CoV-2 Delta variant is probably already prevalent in Slovenia.
- July 23–August 8 - Slovenia at the 2020 Summer Olympics: Slovene athletes win three gold medals (canoeist Benjamin Savšek, road racing cyclist Primož Roglič, and sport climber Janja Garnbret) and five overall in the most successful Summer Olympics run in the history of Slovenia.
- July 28 - the World Heritage Committee inscribes selected works of architect Jože Plečnik in Ljubljana and Črna Vas on the list of World Heritage Sites as "The works of Jože Plečnik in Ljubljana – Human Centred Urban Design".

=== August ===
- August 11 - new road traffic rules come in effect, among those right turn on red in intersections with special road signs.

=== September ===
- September 15 - COVID-19 pandemic in Slovenia:
  - the government enacts the "recovered-vaccinated-tested" rule for nearly all employees and customers in the country due to rising numbers of infections.
  - protests against stricter anti-epidemic measures break out in Ljubljana with some 8000 participants, later escalating to violent riots which are suppressed by the Police.

=== October ===
- October 6 - Slovenian Presidency of the Council of the European Union hosts the EU–Western Balkans summit in Brdo Castle near Kranj.

== Deaths ==
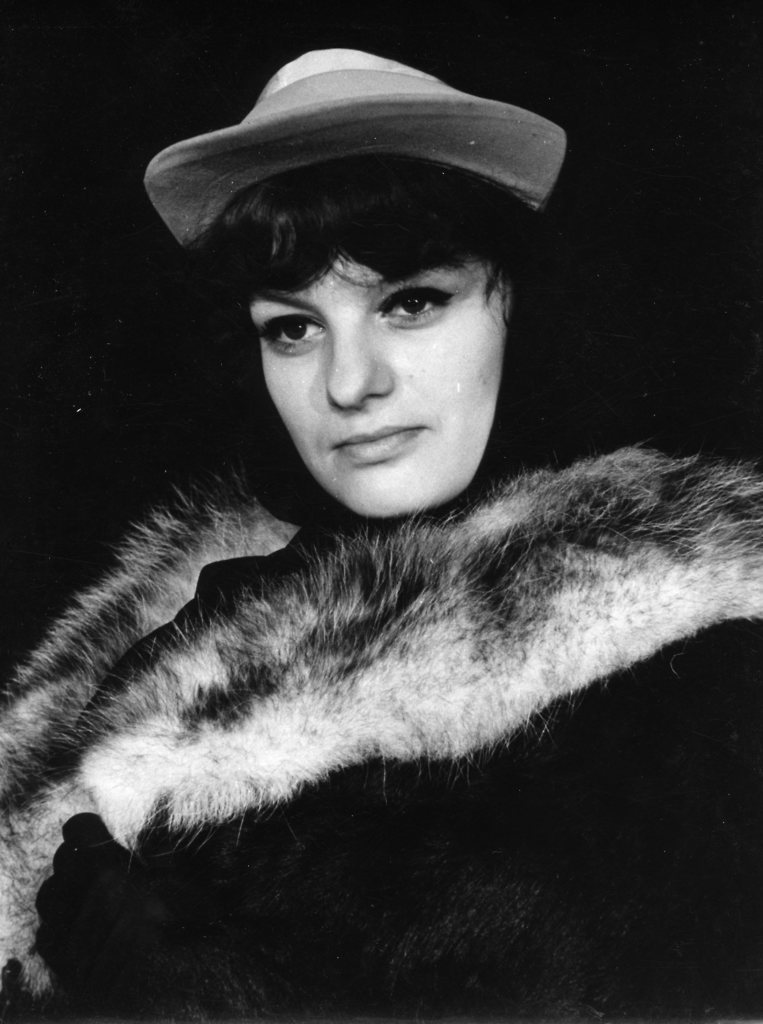
Ljerka Belak

- February 7 - Neva Fajon, film editor
- February 14 - Nevenka Koprivšek, stage actress and producer (b. 1959)
- March 7 - Andreana Družina, political commissar and partisan (b. 1920).
- March 22 - Andreja Kocijančič, physician (b. 1942)
- March 23 - Metod Pirih, Roman Catholic prelate (b. 1936)
- March 25 - Miha Tišler, chemist (b. 1926)
- April 21 - Ljerka Belak, actress (b. 1948)
- May 2 - Fedja Rupel, flutist (b. 1937)
- June 12 - Slavko Špan, middle-distance runner (b. 1938)
- June 26 - Josip Osti, poet (b. 1945)
- August (unknown date) - Bojan Globočnik, ski jumper (b. 1962).
- December 2 - Lovro Šturm, jurist and politician (b. 1938).
