= 2022 in Slovenia =

- Decades: 2000s; 2010s; 2020s
- See also: Other events of 2022; Timeline of Slovenian history

The following is a list of events of the year 2022 in Slovenia.

2022 has been dubbed "super election year" in Slovenia because general elections are scheduled for the three representative political bodies (president, National Assembly and municipal government), as well as elections to the National Council.

== Incumbents ==
- President: Borut Pahor (until December 22); Nataša Pirc Musar onwards
- Prime Minister: Janez Janša (until 1 June), Robert Golob (from 1 June)

== Events ==
Ongoing – COVID-19 pandemic in Slovenia

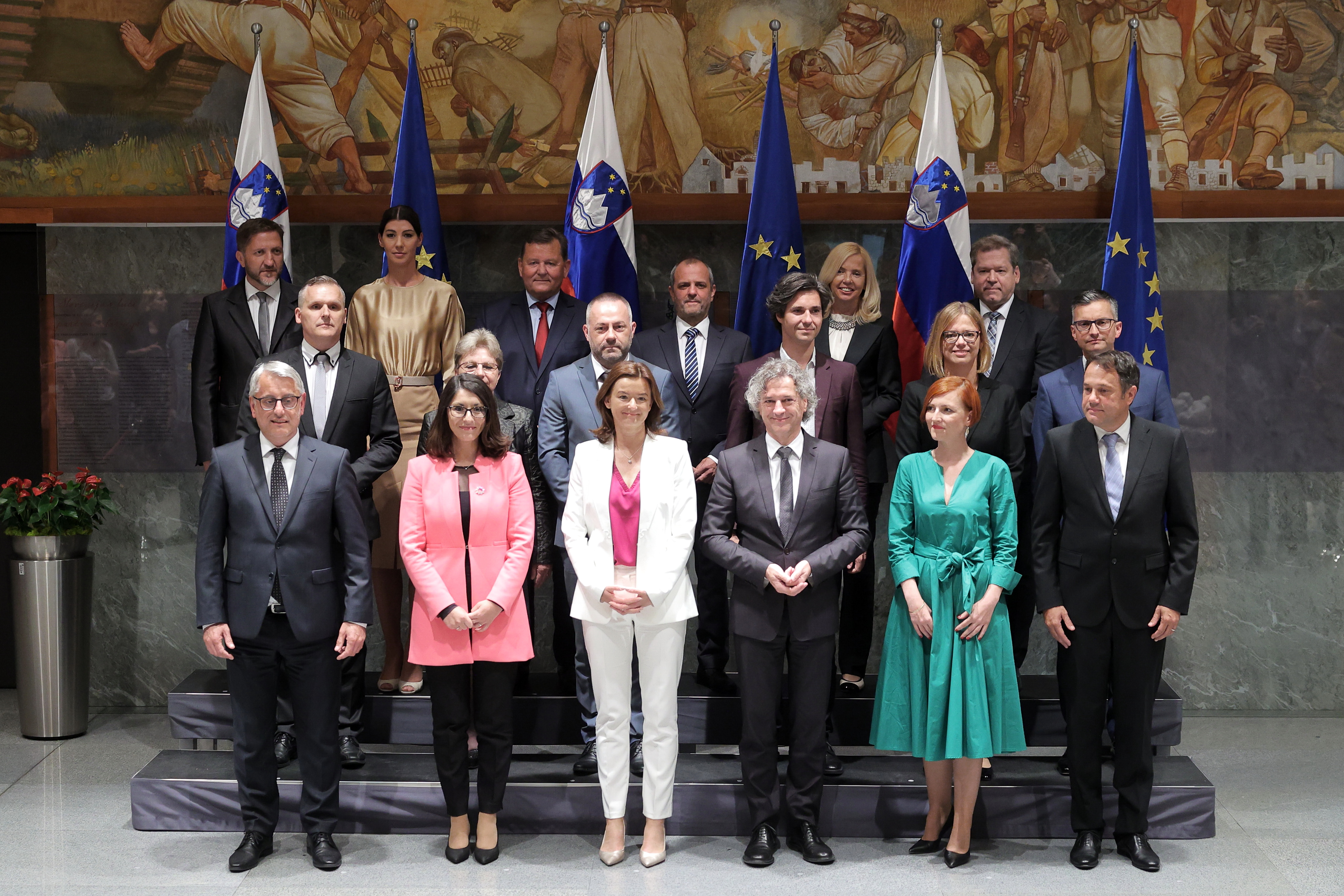
15th Government of Slovenia was constituted on 1st June

- April 24 - Freedom Movement led by Robert Golob wins a landslide victory in the Slovenian parliamentary election, unseating Janez Janša (SDS).
- May 12 - an explosion in the chemical factory Melamin in Kočevje claims six lives, the deadliest industrial accident in the history of independent Slovenia.
- May 13 - the 9th National Assembly of Slovenia is formed according to the results of the April parliamentary election; Urška Klakočar Zupančič from the Freedom Movement becomes the first female president of the Assembly.
- May 23 - the first case of the 2022 monkeypox outbreak is confirmed in Slovenia.
- May 30 - COVID-19 pandemic in Slovenia: Slovenian government abolishes the last remaining anti-COVID measures and disbands the expert counselling group in response to decreasing prevalence of infections.
- June 1 - the National Assembly endorses the 15th Government of Slovenia led by prime minister Robert Golob.
- July 15 – Thirty large fires destroy more than 2,000 hectares on the Karst Plateau, in conjunction with many more fires during the 2022 European heatwave
- November 13 - 2022 Slovenian presidential election: Independent liberal Nataša Pirc Musar defeats her right-wing opponent Anže Logar in a run-off vote and will become the country's first female president.
- November 20 - 2022 Slovenian local elections

== Deaths ==
- April 18 - Janez Matičič, composer (b. 1926)
- May 27 - Marko Račič, athlete (b. 1920)
- May 30 - Boris Pahor, writer (b. 1913)
- June 4 - Goran Sankovič, footballer (b. 1979)
- June 17 - Marlenka Stupica, painter and illustrator (b. 1924)
- August 5 - Kostja Gatnik, painter, graphic designer and illustrator (b. 1945)
- August 5 - Rudolf Knez, Olympic ice hockey player (b. 1944)
- August 11 - Hana Mazi Jamnik, cross country skier (b. 2002)
- August 26 - Jože Mencinger, lawyer and politician (b. 1941)
- September 15 - Radko Polič, actor (b. 1942)
- October 7 - Jure Robežnik, pianist and composer (b. 1933)
- December 6 - Miha Baloh, actor (b. 1928)
- December 12 - Lado Kralj, theatre critic (b. 1938)
- December 28 - Draga Ahačič, actress, film director, translator and journalist (born 1924).
- December 30 - Janez Zemljarič, prime minister (b. 1928)
