= 2020 in Slovenia =

- Decades: 2000s; 2010s; 2020s
- See also: Other events of 2020; Timeline of Slovenian history

Events in the year 2020 in Slovenia.

== Incumbents ==
- President: Borut Pahor
- Prime Minister: Marjan Šarec (until March 13) Janez Janša (from March 13)

== Ongoing ==
- COVID-19 pandemic in Slovenia

== Events ==
=== January ===
- January 27 – Incumbent Prime Minister Marjan Šarec resigns, citing inefficiency of his minority government, and calls for early elections.

=== March ===
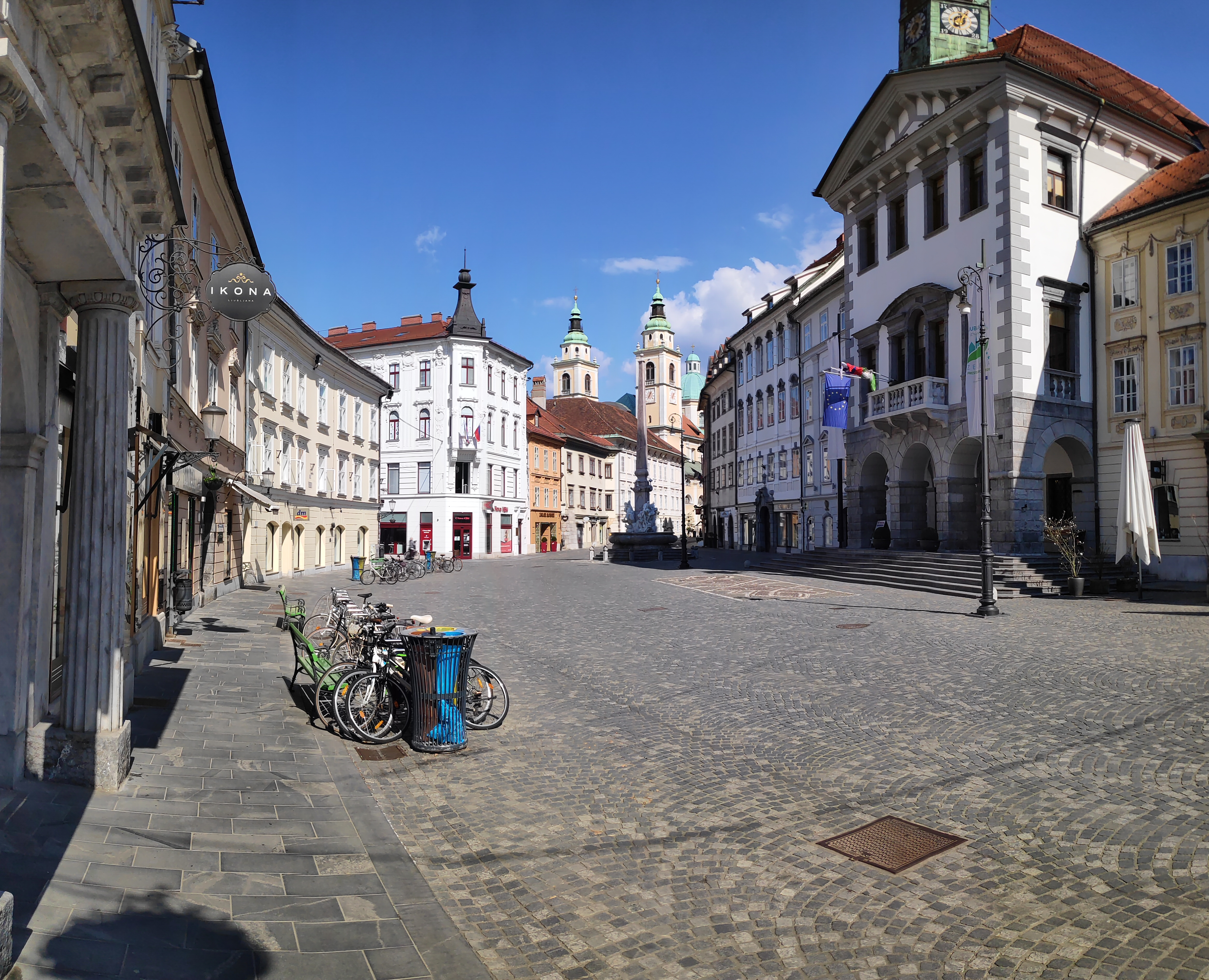
Empty old town square in Ljubljana on March 18, after COVID-19 epidemic had been declared a week earlier

- March 4 – The first case of the COVID-19 pandemic in the country is detected.
- March 12 – The acting government formally declares an epidemic and activates the national emergency response plan in response to the spread of COVID-19.
- March 13 – The newly formed coalition led by prime minister Janez Janša is confirmed by the National Assembly, and sworn in as the 14th Government of Slovenia.
- March 16 – All educational institutions in the country are closed to limit the spread of COVID-19.
- March 30 – All public gatherings are banned, and movement is restricted to the municipality of residence (with some exceptions).

=== April ===
- April 18 – The government begins to ease restrictions on movement due to the decreasing number of COVID-19 cases, with the most severe bans lifted on April 30.

=== May ===
- May 2
  - No new COVID-19 infections are detected for the first time since the outbreak of the epidemic on March 4.
  - Thousands of demonstrators on bicycles stage a protest against the government in Ljubljana due to allegations of corruption and mismanagement of the COVID-19 epidemic response.
- May 15 – Slovenia becomes the first European country to lift the declaration of the COVID-19 epidemic (effective May 31), but several restrictions remain in place.

=== September ===
- September 3 – After several delays, the first Slovene-built satellites, Nemo HD and Trisat, are carried successfully to space by Vega launch vehicle.
- September 20 – Slovene cyclist Tadej Pogačar wins the 2020 Tour de France for UAE Team Emirates, with Primož Roglič (Team Jumbo–Visma) taking second place.

=== October ===
- October 19 - The government declares a COVID-19 epidemic again in response to the rising number of confirmed cases since September, enacts a 9 pm-6 am curfew and limits public gatherings and businesses.
- October 27 - To limit the spread of COVID-19, movement of citizens is again restricted to municipality of residence, though with more extensive list of exceptions.

=== December ===
- December 27 - Mass vaccination against COVID-19 starts with the Pfizer–BioNTech vaccine, at the same time as most other EU states.

== Deaths ==
- 31 January – Janez Stanovnik, economist and politician (b. 1922)
- 18 March – Peter Musevski, actor (b. 1965)
- 11 April – Alojz Uran, Roman Catholic prelate (b. 1945)
- 17 May – Aleksandra Kornhauser Frazer, chemist (b. 1926)
- 18 May – Marko Elsner, footballer (b. 1960)
- 1 June – Janez Kocijančič, politician and lawyer (b. 1941)
- 8 November - Miro Steržaj, 9-pin bowling player, businessman and politician (b. 1933)
- 14 November - Peter Florjančič, inventor and athlete (b. 1919).
- 21 November - Jožef Smej, Roman Catholic prelate (b. 1922)
