= 2024 in Slovenia =

- Decades: 2000s; 2010s; 2020s
- See also: Other events of 2024; Timeline of Slovenian history

Events in the year 2024 in Slovenia.

== Incumbents ==
- President: Nataša Pirc Musar
- Prime Minister: Robert Golob

== Events ==
=== January ===
- 1 January – Slovenia begins its two-year mandate as a non-permanent member of the United Nations Security Council.

=== March ===
- 5 March – Breakthrough of the second tube of the Karawanks motorway tunnel (under construction since 2018).

=== June ===
- 4 June – Slovenia officially recognizes the State of Palestine after the National Assembly votes 52-0 in favor of the government's proposal.
- 9 June –
  - 2024 European Parliament election in Slovenia.
  - Alongside the European Parliament election, voters cast their votes in three consultative referendums: on the right of cannabis use for medicinal and personal purposes, on the right to assisted suicide, and on the preferential voting system in general elections.
- 14 June–1 July – Slovenia national football team participates in UEFA Euro 2024, its first UEFA European Championship in 24 years, and advances to the round of 16 for the first time in history, where it is defeated by Portugal after penalty shoot-out.

=== July ===
- 26 July–11 August – A record 90 athletes represent Slovenia at the 2024 Summer Olympics in Paris.
- 31 July – A Russian couple posing as Argentine nationals, Artem Dultsev and Anna Dultseva, is sentenced to 19 months' imprisonment by a court in Ljubljana for spying but are immediately released due to time already served in custody and ordered expelled from Slovenia for five years as part of the international Russian prisoner exchange.

=== October ===
- 19 October – Work begins on the reconstruction and expansion of Ljubljana railway station, a major Slovenian railway junction.

=== November ===
- 17 November – A Cessna Skyhawk crashes while on panoramic flight in Gancani, killing all three people on board.

== Deaths ==
- 15 January – Jožica Puhar, sociologist, politician and diplomat (born 1942)
- 17 January – Jurij Souček, stage actor (born 1929)
- 18 January – Stanko Kristl, architect (born 1922)
- 2 May – Manca Košir, journalist and author (born 1948)
- 21 June – Marko Ilešič, jurist (born 1947)
- November – Eka Vogelnik, illustrator and puppeteer (born 1946)
- November – Ani Bitenc, translator (born 1933)
- 1 December – Vinci Vogue Anžlovar, film director (born 1963)

== See also ==
- 2024 in the European Union
- 2024 in Europe
