= 2016 in Slovenia =

- Decades: 1990s; 2000s; 2010s; 2020s
- See also: Other events of 2016; Timeline of Slovenian history

The following is a list of events of the year 2016 in Slovenia.

== Incumbents ==
- President: Borut Pahor
- Prime Minister: Miro Cerar

== Deaths ==
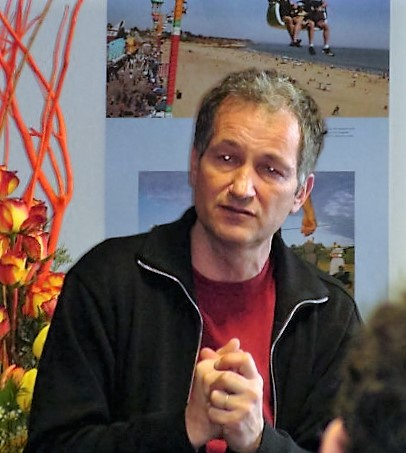
Aleš Debeljak

- 28 January – Aleš Debeljak, cultural critic, poet and essayist (b. 1961).
- 1 February – Dušan Velkaverh, lyricist (b. 1943)
- 27 February – Vid Pečjak, writer and psychologist (b. 1929).
- 11 March – Tita Kovač Artemis, chemist and writer (b. 1930).
- 7. May – Ignac Gregorač, architect, journalist, and Partisan (b. 1916)
- 19 August – Mira Stupica, actress (b. 1923)
