= 2023 in Slovenia =

- Decades: 2000s; 2010s; 2020s
- See also: Other events of 2023; Timeline of Slovenian history

Events in the year 2023 in Slovenia.

== Incumbents ==
- President: Nataša Pirc Musar
- Prime Minister: Robert Golob

== Events ==
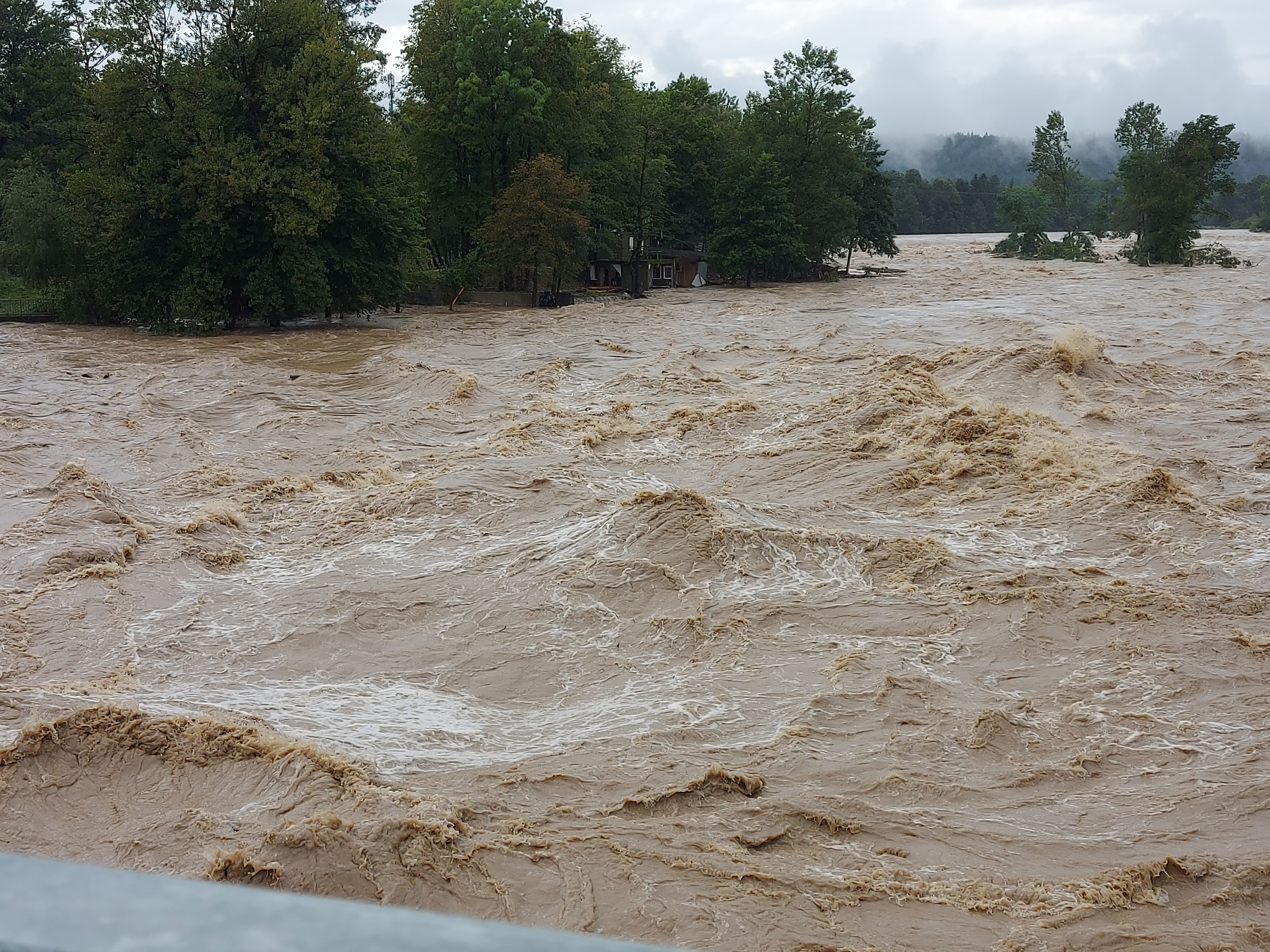
Sava in Tacen just north of Ljubljana during the 2023 Carinthia and Slovenia floods on 4 August

- 1 January – with Croatia's accession to the Schengen Area, border controls are abolished at 57 border crossings between the countries.
- 16 January – Ministry of the Environment and Spatial Planning of the Republic of Slovenia grants a 20-year extension for operation of the Krško Nuclear Power Plant.
- 22 February – 5 March – Planica Nordic Centre hosts the 43rd edition of the FIS Nordic World Ski Championships.
- 28 May – Primož Roglič becomes the first Slovene cyclist to win the prestigious Giro d'Italia race.
- 6 June – Slovenia is elected a non-permanent member of the United Nations Security Council for the period 2024–2025.
- 15–25 June – Slovenia and Israel host the EuroBasket Women 2023 tournament, with Slovenian team not progressing beyond the group stage.
- 4–6 August – 2023 Slovenia floods: a protracted period of heavy rain leads to flooding in large parts of northern, central and eastern Slovenia, necessitating evacuation of thousands of people, and causing at least six casualties and billions of euros of structural damage (according to early estimates), the worst natural disaster in modern history of the country.
- 19 December – Slovenian Armed Forces receive the first of the two military transport aircraft Alenia C-27J Spartan ordered as part of the agreement on military cooperation between Italy and Slovenia.

== Deaths ==
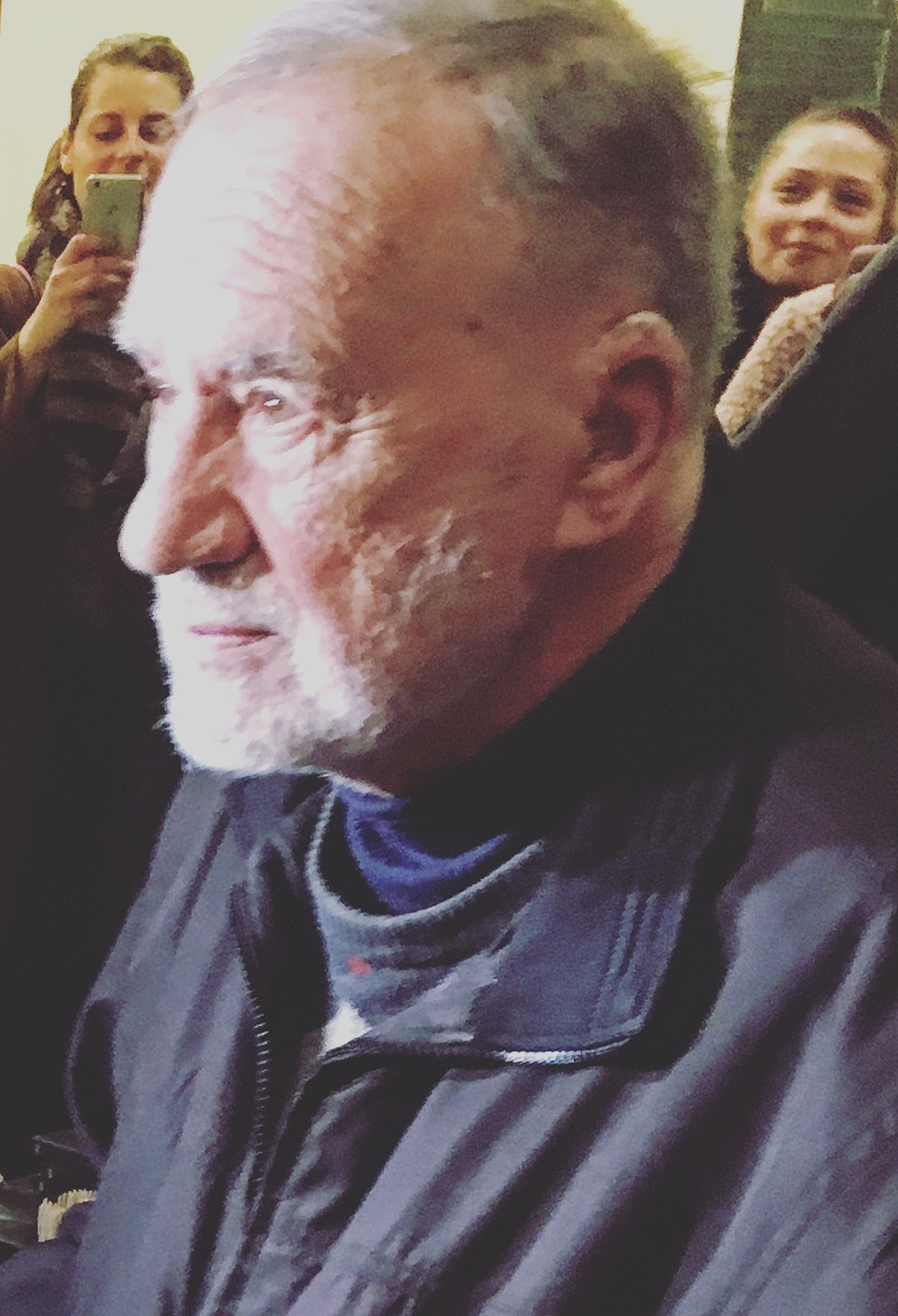
Mako Sajko

- 1 January – Mako Sajko, documentarist, screenwriter and film director (born 1927).
- 3 February - Bine Rogelj, ski jumper and caricaturist (born 1929).
- 6 May – Ivan Bizjak, mathematician and politician (born 1956).
- 7 May – Boris Sket, zoologist (born 1936).
- 19 May – Mirko Ramovš, ethnochoreologist (born 1935).
- 8 September – Sašo Hribar, radio and television presenter, and comedian (born 1960).
- 20 November – Filip Robar Dorin, filmmaker (born 1940).
