= 2019 in Slovenia =

- Decades: 1990s; 2000s; 2010s; 2020s
- See also: Other events of 2019; Timeline of Slovenian history

Events in the year 2019 in Slovenia.

== Incumbents ==
- President: Borut Pahor
- Prime Minister: Marjan Šarec

== Events ==
- 1 January – a ban on single-use plastic shopping bags comes into effect.
- 26 May - voters select members of the European Parliament from Slovenia in the European Parliament election.
- 13–29 September – Slovenia, Belgium, France, and the Netherlands host the 31st Men's European Volleyball Championship; Slovenia team win second place after losing against Serbia in the finals.

== Deaths ==
- 22 March – Zinka Zorko, linguist (b. 1936)
- 18 April - Iča Putrih, comedian (b. 1942)
- 18 August - Ivan Oman, politician (b. 1929)
- 26 August - Zmago Modic, painter (b. 1953)
- 16 September - Davo Karničar, alpinist, extreme skier (b. 1962)
- 24 September - Dušan Hadži, chemist (b. 1921)

== See also ==
- 2019 European Parliament election
