= 2017 in Slovenia =

- Decades: 1990s; 2000s; 2010s; 2020s
- See also: Other events of 2017; Timeline of Slovenian history

Events in the year 2017 in Slovenia.

== Incumbents ==
- President: Borut Pahor
- Prime Minister: Miro Cerar

== Events ==
- January 28 – Slovenia men's national handball team claims third place at the 2017 World Men's Handball Championship, becoming the first team to win a medal for Slovenia in team sports at world championships.
- June 29 – Croatia–Slovenia border disputes: the Permanent Court of Arbitration issues a decision in the arbitration case between the two neighbouring countries, ruling, among other things, that Slovenia should have access to international waters through a corridor crossing Croatian territorial waters. Croatia doesn't acknowledge the decision.
- September 17 – Slovenia national basketball team wins the EuroBasket 2017 championship, becoming European champions.
- September 24 – the majority of voters back the proposed law governing the Divača-Koper railway upgrade in a national referendum.
- October 22 – incumbent president Borut Pahor wins first round of the Slovenian presidential election 2017, but falls short of the majority needed for an outright re-election.
- November 12 – incumbent president Borut Pahor is re-elected in the second round of the Slovenian presidential election 2017, winning 53% of the vote against the runner-up Marjan Šarec.

== Deaths ==
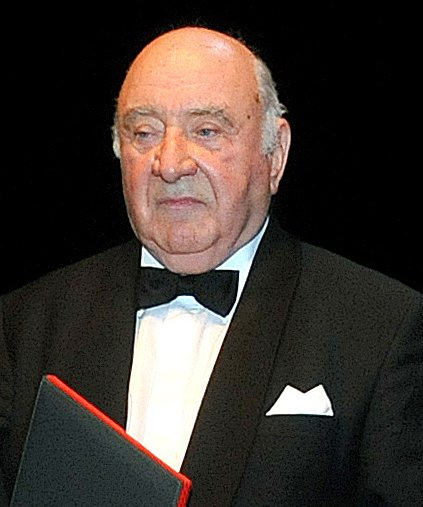
Anton Nanut in 2011

- January 13 – Anton Nanut, conductor (b. 1932).
- January 17 – Alenka Goljevšček, writer, essayist and playwright (b. 1933).
- July 30 – Anton Vratuša, politician and diplomat (b. 1915)
- December 10 – Jernej Šugman, actor (b. 1968)
