= 2018 in Slovenia =

- Decades: 1990s; 2000s; 2010s; 2020s
- See also: Other events of 2018; Timeline of Slovenian history

Events in the year 2018 in Slovenia.

== Incumbents ==
- President: Borut Pahor
- Prime Minister: Miro Cerar (until 13 September 2018), Marjan Šarec (from 13 September 2018)

== Events ==
- March 14 – Prime Minister Miro Cerar announces his resignation following complications with planning the upgrade of the Divača–Koper Railway, one of the key infrastructural projects of his government.
- May 13 – national referendum on the Divača–Koper Railway upgrade is repeated, but the new referendum again doesn't reach the prescribed quorum.
- May 24 – The Constitutional Court unanimously upheld the ban of all forms of ritual slaughter, stating that 'the Constitution did not allow easily preventable suffering to be inflicted on animals without a justified cause', and that this provision did 'not disproportionally interfere' with religious freedom.
- June 3 – Slovenian Democratic Party led by Janez Janša wins the majority in the snap parliamentary election.
- September 7 – Aljaž Tower, a symbol of Slovenia, is removed from the summit of Triglav for the first time in 123 years and transported to Ljubljana for repairs.
- September 13 – new government under premier Marjan Šarec is formed after Janez Janša fails to secure a coalition, the first minority government in the history of Slovenia.
- September 15 – after Let's Clean Slovenia 2012, a nation-wide volunteer clean-up effort is again organized by the Ecologists Without Borders society.

== Deaths ==
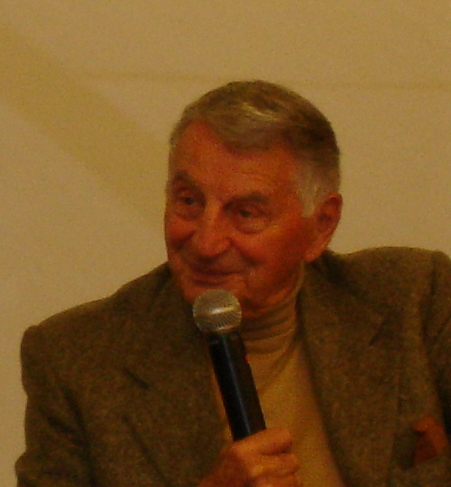
Demeter Bitenc

- February 26 – Veljko Rus, sociologist (b. 1929).
- March 21– Dejan Bravničar, violinist (b. 1937)
- April 22 – Demeter Bitenc, actor (b. 1922)
- June 8 – Janko Pleterski, historian, politician and diplomat (b. 1923).
- June 25 - Štefka Drolc, actress (b. 1923)
- August 24 - Ciril Zlobec, writer, journalist and politician (b. 1925).
- September 13 - Ivo Petrić, composer (b. 1931)
- October 16 - Lidija Sotlar, ballerina and teacher (b. 1929).
