= Iča Putrih =

Slovenian comedian (1942–2019)

- Born: Marija Kos; 2 April 1942; Ljubljana
- Died: 18 April 2019 (aged 77)
- Occupation: comedian

Iča Putrih, born Marija Kos (4 February 1942 – 18 April 2019), was a Slovenian comedian.

Putrih was born in Ljubljana, in a family with three children, and spent her youth in Dravlje. At the age of 14 and a half, she was employed as secretary after graduating from a gymnasium. Later, she was also employed as a secretary at Delo. For many years she has collaborated with fellow comedian Marjan Roblek, and as a humorist she has also performed with Avsenik Brothers Ensemble for two years.

Putrih was married three times and the mother of two children, son and daughter. Her son died at the age of 16 of cancer. She died at the age of 77, after serious health complications with the gut.
