= Hana Mazi Jamnik =

Slovenian cross-country skier (2002–2022)

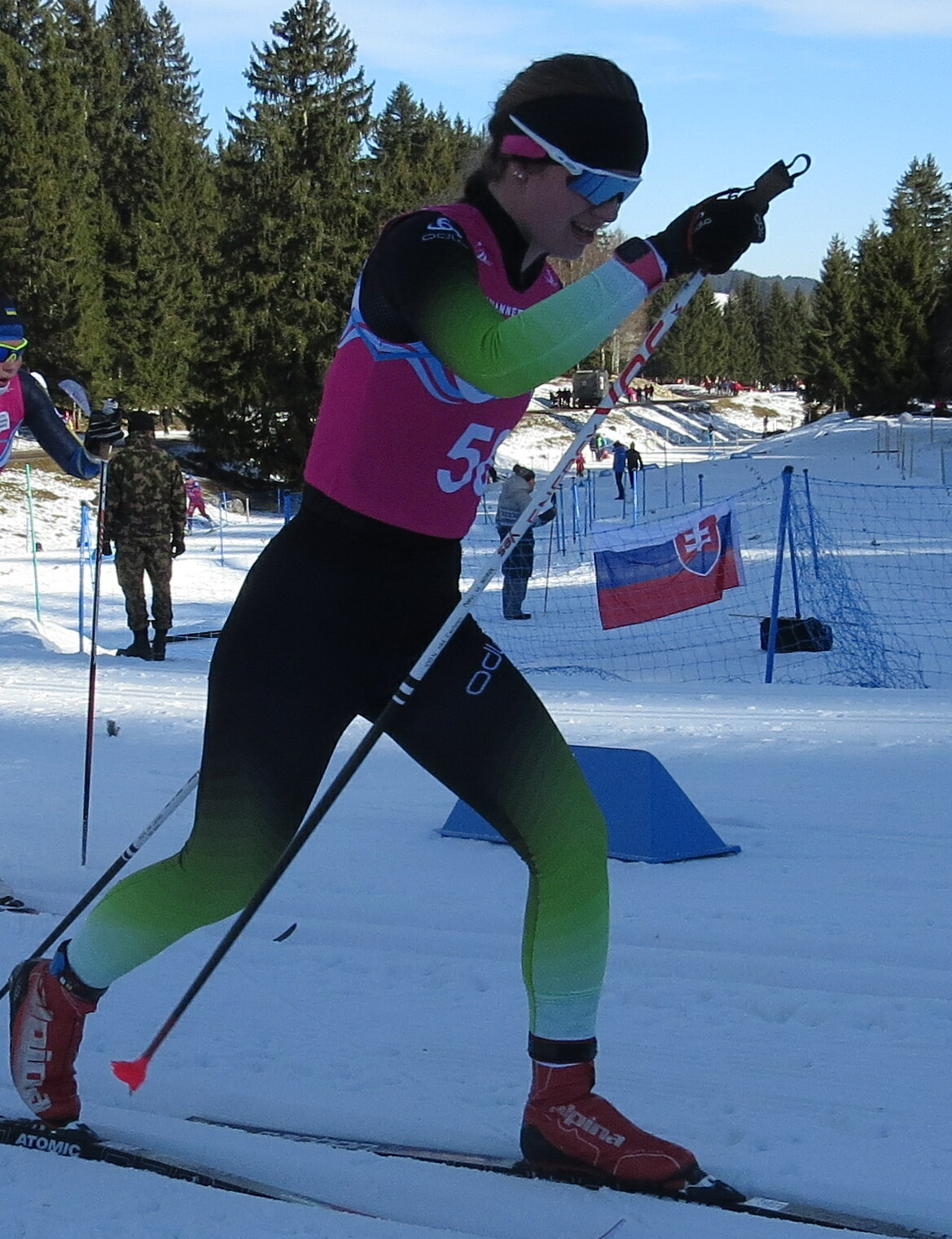

Hana Mazi Jamnik (8 December 2002 – 11 August 2022) was a Slovenian cross-country skier. She participated at the 2020 Winter Youth Olympics in the cross-country skiing competition, participating in two events in the competition. She entered the girls' sprint event, but did not start.

== Death ==
Jamnik died on 11 August 2022 after being hit by a truck in Strand Municipality, Norway.
