= Mirko Ramovš =

Slovene ethnochoreologist (1935–2023)

- Born: Bogomir Ramovš; October 5, 1935; Ljubljana, Kingdom of Yugoslavia
- Died: May 19, 2023 (aged 87); Ljubljana, Slovenia
- Occupation: Ethnochoreologist

Mirko Ramovš (October 5, 1935 – May 19, 2023), also known as Bogomir Ramovš, was a Slovene ethnochoreologist.

== Life ==
Mirko Ramovš was born in Ljubljana. He graduated from the classical high school in Ljubljana in 1954, and in 1960 he received a bachelor's degree from the Slavic Department of the University of Ljubljana's Faculty of Arts in Ljubljana. He spent his professional career (since 1986 as an expert advisor) at the Ethnomusicology Institute (from 1972 to 1994 the Section for Ethnomusicology within the Slovenian Ethnography Institute) at the Slovenian Academy of Sciences and Arts. He was the head of the institute from 1985 to 1990). From 1965 to 2010, he was the artistic director of the France Marolt Student Folkdance Group (Slovene: Akademska folklorna skupina France Marolt). He lectured on folk dances at the Department of Ethnology and Cultural Anthropology at the University of Ljubljana's Faculty of Arts.

== Work ==
Marolt wrote over 50 choreographies for Slovene folk dances.

- Plesat me pelji: plesno izročilo na Slovenskem (1980)
- Polka je ukazana
  - Volume 1: Plesi z Gorenjske, Dolenjske in Notranjske (1992)
  - Volume 2: Plesi iz Bele krajine in s Kostela (1995)
  - Volume 3: Plesi iz Prekmurja in s Porabja (1996)

== Recognitions and awards ==
Marolt received the Order of Merit for the Nation, Silver Star (1974), the Kidrič Foundation Award (1981), the Slovenian Folklore Award (1984), the Župančič Award (1989), and the Murko Award (1995). In 1998 he received the Order of Freedom of the Republic of Slovenia "for long-term research work and for services in the popularization of the Slovene folkdance tradition, especially for the long-term creative leadership of the France Marolt Student Folkdance Group." He also received the Slovenian Academy of Sciences and Arts Research Center gold medal (2001), the Zois Award for lifetime achievement in ethnochoreology (2002), and the Štrekelj Award (2009).
