= Dravograd railway station =

Railway station in Dravograd, Slovenia

Dravograd Železniška postaja Dravograd
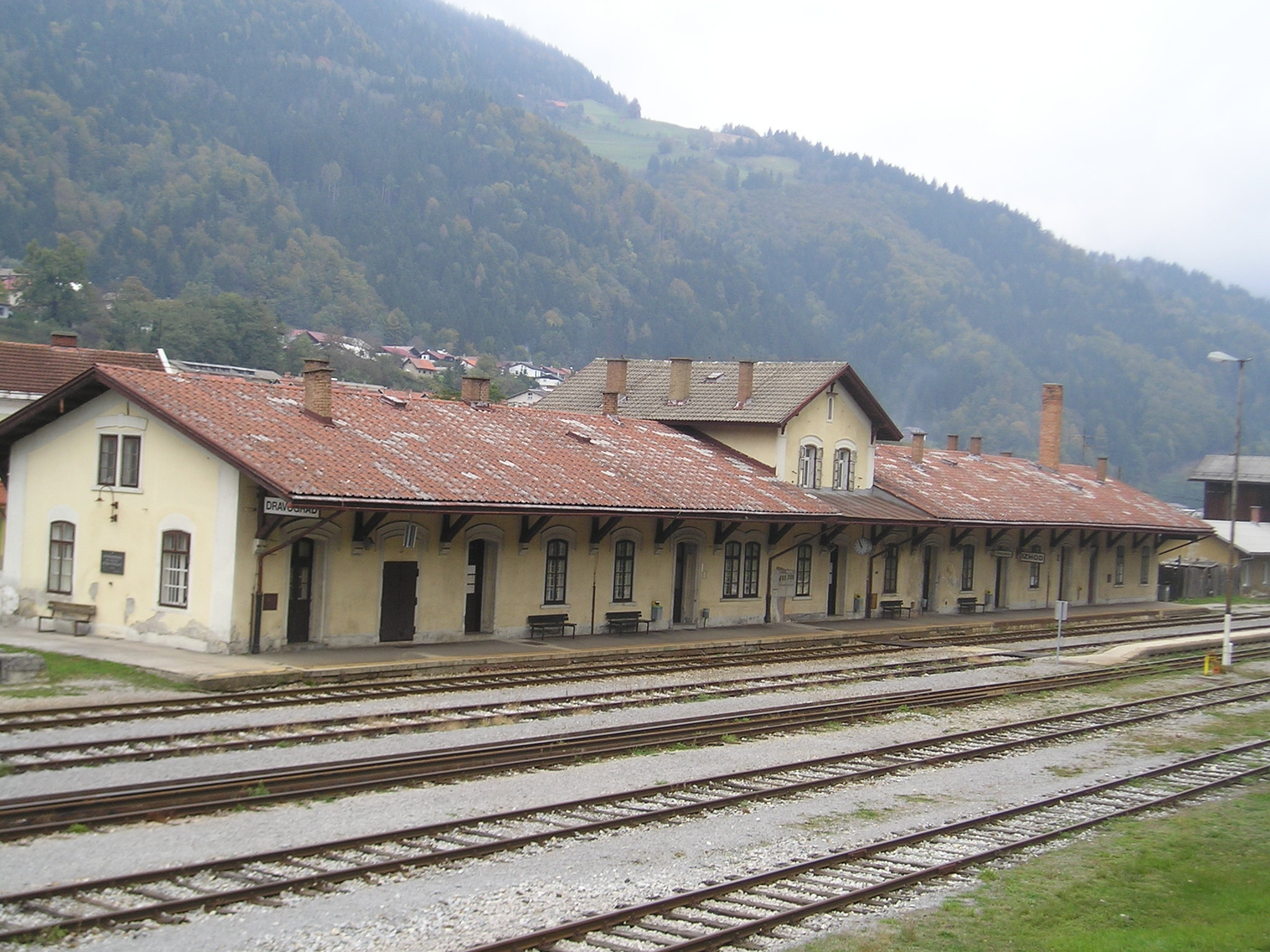
- Dravograd railway station

General information
- Location: 27 Meža; 2370 Dravograd; Dravograd; Slovenia
- Coordinates: 46°35′14″N 15°01′36″E
- Elevation: 338 m (1,109 ft)
- System: railway station
- Owner: Slovenske železnice
- Operator: Slovenske železnice
- Line: Drava Valley Railway
- Platforms: 1
- Tracks: 1
- Connections: Maribor–Prevalje (passenger)

History
- Opened: 1863
Location
- Location within Slovenia

Dravograd railway station (Slovene: Železniška postaja Dravograd) is a railway station in Dravograd, Slovenia. It is on the Drava Valley Railway (Drautalbahn), a single-track, non-electrified regional line between Maribor and Klagenfurt, Austria, built in 1863.

== History ==
The Maribor–Dravograd–Klagenfurt–Villach line was completed in 1863. Branches towards Celje and Wolfsberg were later added, making Dravograd an important railway junction and river port on the Drava.

The line towards Villach via the Holmec border crossing has not carried traffic since 1965. A branch from Dravograd to Velenje was closed in 1968. The only remaining passenger service is the Maribor–Prevalje line.

== Modernisation ==
Under the European Union's Recovery and Resilience Facility, an upgrade of the 22 km (14 mi) section from Sveti Danijel to Dravograd and the state border began in 2024, with completion expected by mid-2026. The EU is contributing €86.6 million towards the total investment of €113.9 million. The project aims to improve rail accessibility and increase the line's resilience to natural disasters, following damage in 2023.

== Gallery ==
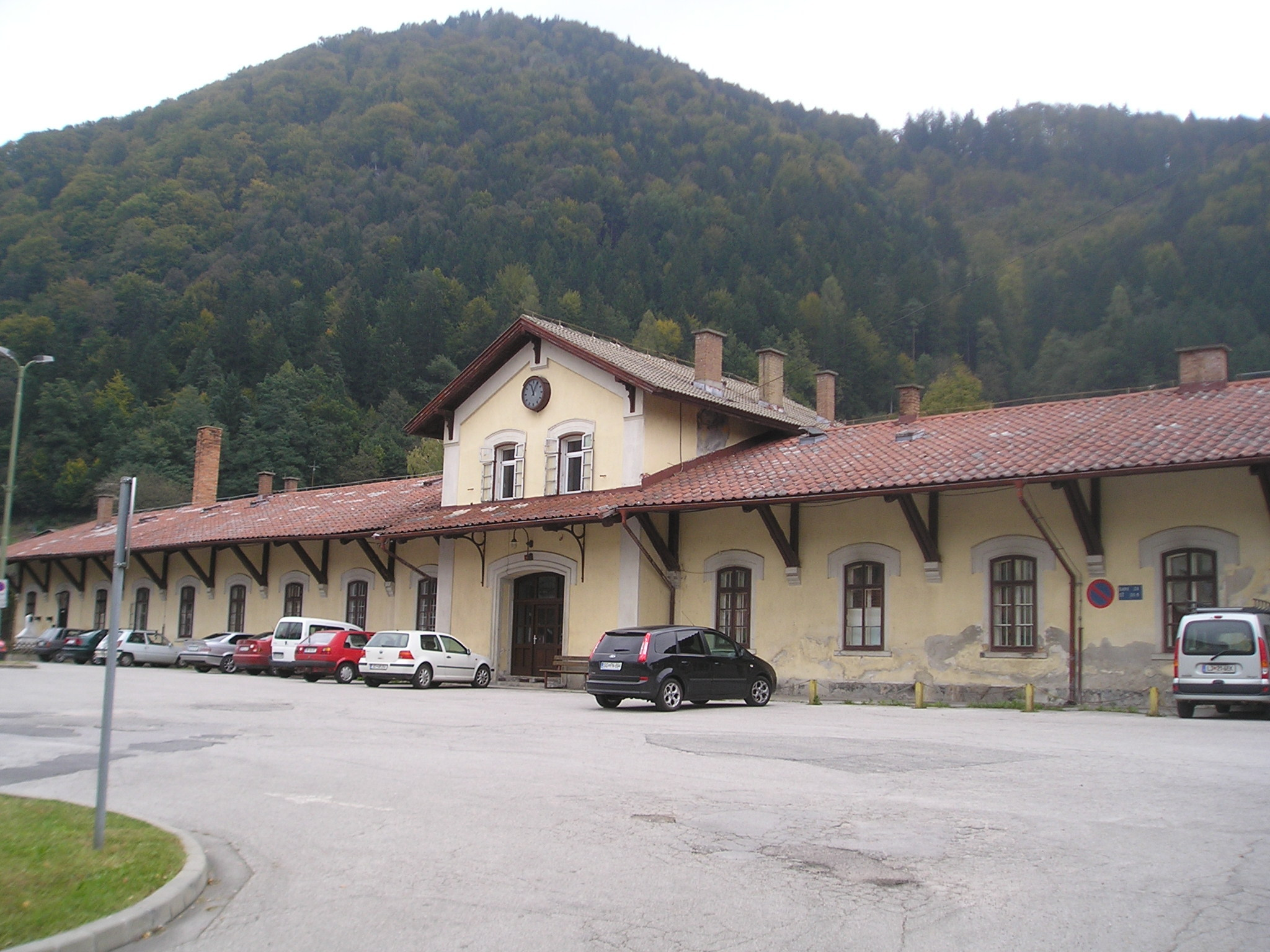
Station front

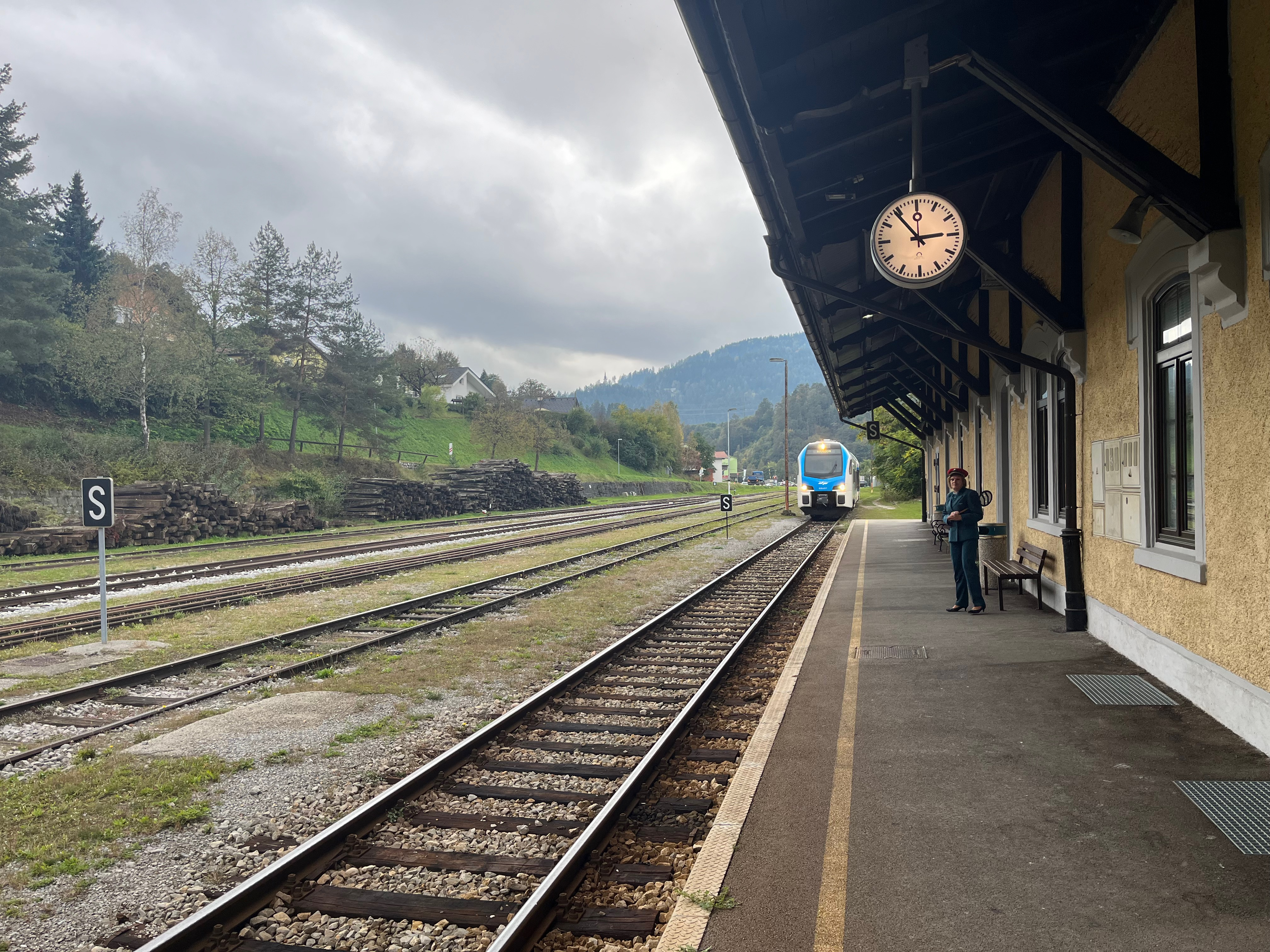
DMU arriving at Dravograd

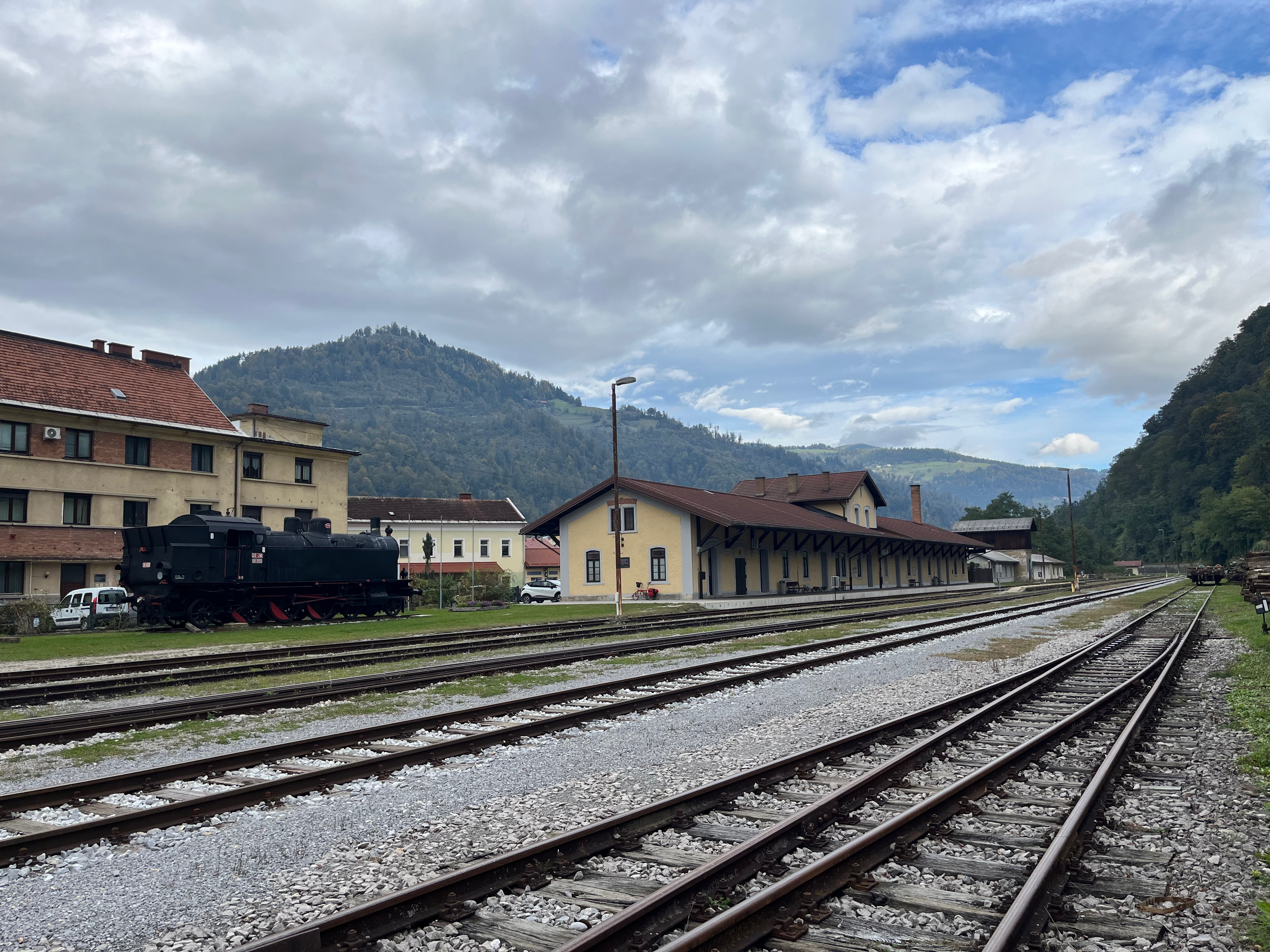
Platform view

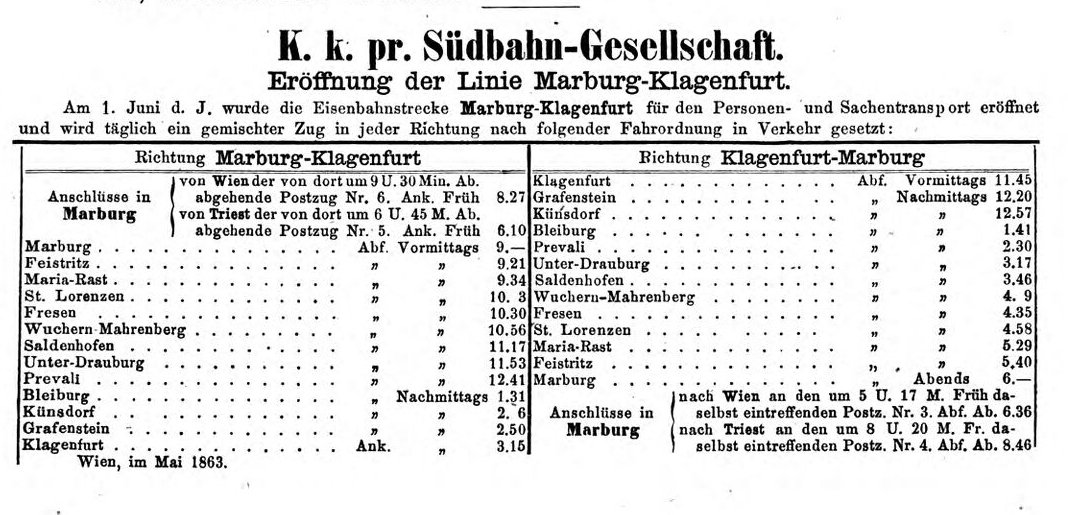
Opening timetable, June 1863

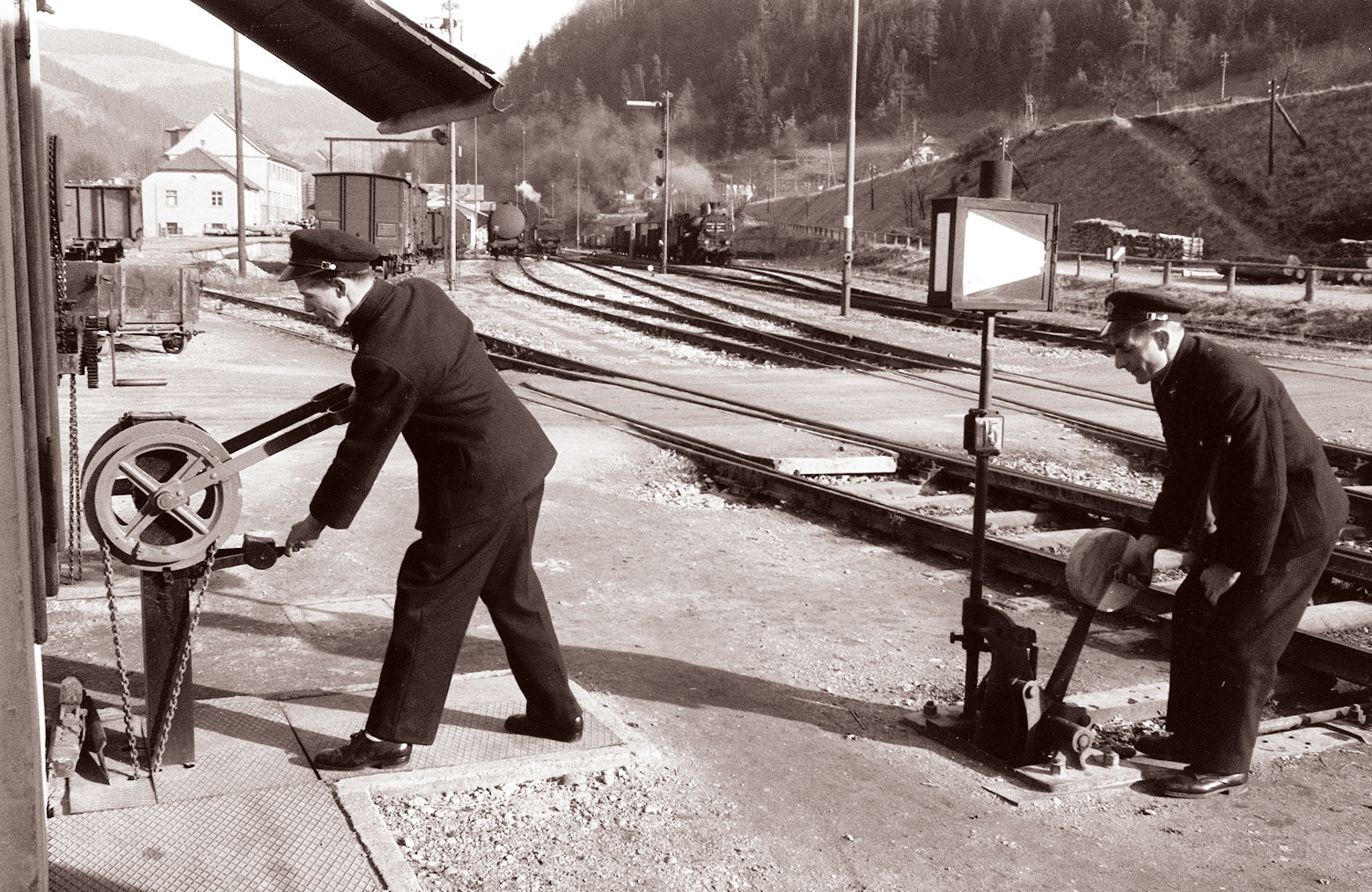
The station in 1960

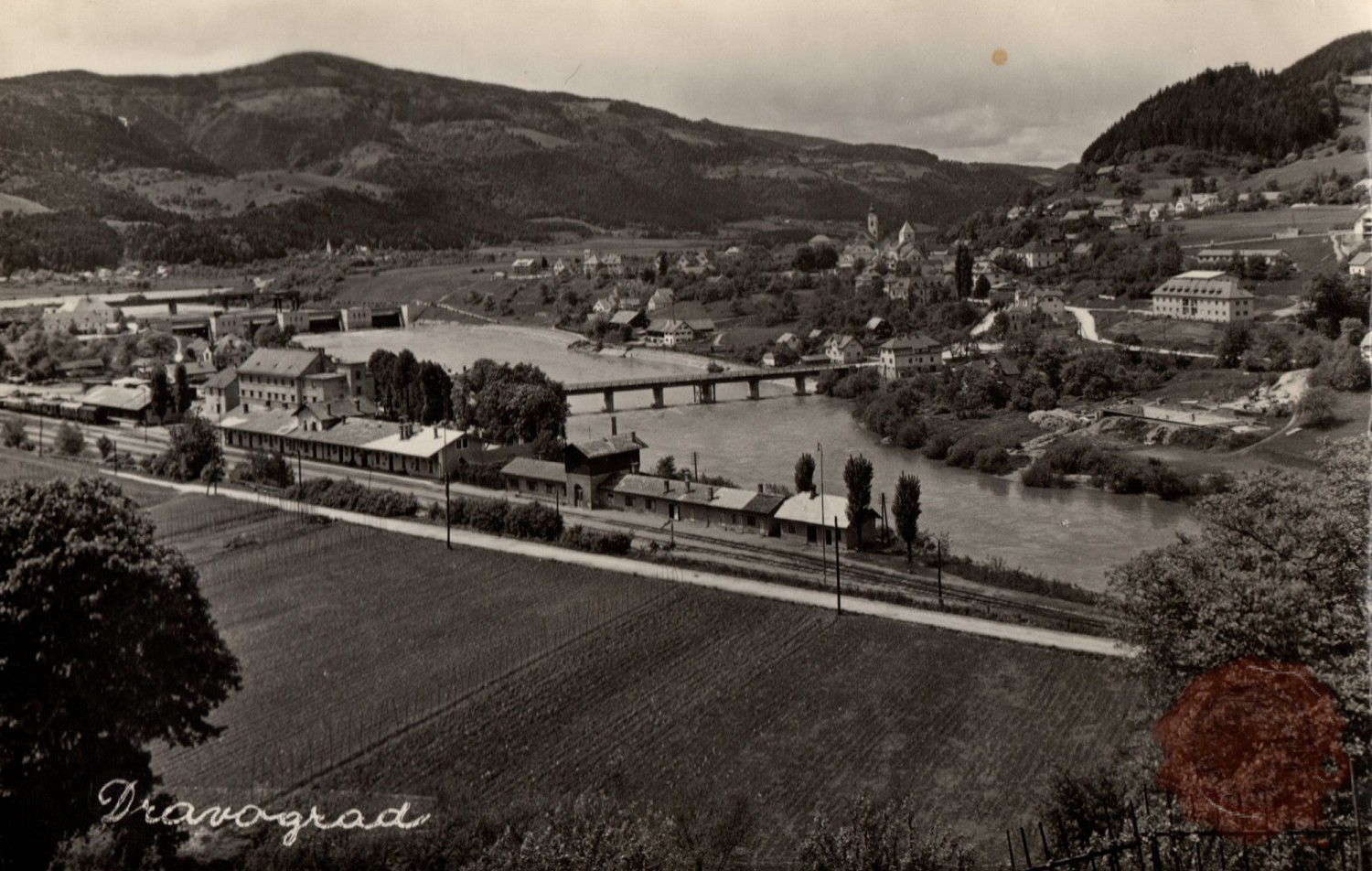
Historic postcard of Dravograd

== See also ==
- Drava Valley Railway
- Dravograd
