= Nevenka Koprivšek =

Slovenian actress (1959–2021)

- Born: 1 June 1959; Ljubljana, Socialist Republic of Slovenia, Yugoslavia
- Died: 14 February 2021 (aged 61)
- Occupation: Actress

Nevenka Koprivšek (1 June 1959 – 14 February 2021) was a Slovenian actress.

== Career ==
In 1983, she graduated from L'École Internationale de Théâtre Jacques Lecoq in Paris. She would become the artistic director of the Glej Theater in Ljubljana and, in 1997, she began directing the International Contemporary Performing Arts Festival. In 2003, she received the Župančičeva nagrada. On 19 October 2011, she became a Knight of the Ordre des Arts et des Lettres from the Ambassador of France to Slovenia.

Nevenka Koprivšek died on 14 February 2021 at the age of 61.
