= Miha Tišler =

Slovene chemist (1926–2021)

Miha Tišler (September 18, 1926 – March 25, 2021) was a Slovene chemist who served as a professor of chemistry at the Faculty of Natural Sciences and Technology in Ljubljana, Slovenia.

Tišler was the author of 50 books and monographs on heterocyclic chemistry, and he was named a Knight of the Order of St. Gregory the Great.

Miha Tišler was born in Ljubljana on September 18, 1926. In 1955 he was appointed a professor of chemistry at the University of Ljubljana. In 1977 he received the Kidrič Prize. From 1978 to 1980 he served as the president of International Society of Heterocyclic Chemistry.
