= Peter Florjančič =

Slovenian ski jumper (1919–2020)

- Born: 5 March 1919; Bled, Kingdom of Serbs, Croats and Slovenes
- Died: 14 November 2020 (aged 101); Radovljica, Slovenia
- Occupation: Inventor
- Spouse: Verena

Peter Florjančič (5 March 1919 – 14 November 2020) was a Slovene inventor and Olympic athlete. His successful inventions included the perfume atomiser, and the plastic photographic slide frame.

== Life ==
Florjančič was born in the Alpine town of Bled in the then newly established Kingdom of Serbs, Croats and Slovenes, present-day Slovenia. At sixteen, he was the youngest member of the Yugoslav ski-jumping team in the 1936 Olympic Games.

In 1943, during the German annexation of Slovenia, Florjančič—knowing he would be called up to serve in the German Army on the Eastern Front—decided instead to join a friend on a fake skiing trip to Kitzbühel, Austria. He faked his own death on Hahnenkamm, escaping over the border into neutral Switzerland. He met his future wife Verena, a Swiss model and actress, in Zürich and they went on to be married for more than 65 years.

== Work ==
While held in an internment camp as a refugee, he invented a loom that could be used by disabled servicemen.

In 1950, he moved to Monte Carlo where he lived for 13 years, invented the perfume atomiser, and appeared in an uncredited role in the film The Monte Carlo Story. He subsequently lived in a number of countries, including Monaco, Austria, Switzerland, Italy, and Germany.

His other successful inventions included a work-out bed and plastic ice skates. He also invented the plastic zipper (1948), and the airbag (1957), neither of which were successful at the time because of the quality of the materials available. Both were perfected at later dates by other inventors.

In 2007, Florjančič published his autobiography, Skok v Smetano (Jump into the Cream). He described himself thus: "I’ve had five citizenships, 43 cars and the longest passport. The profession of inventor forced me to spend 25 years in hotels, four years in cars, three years on trains, a year and a half on airplanes and a year on board of ships."

In 2011, at 92 years old, and almost blind, Florjančič was still working, and sketching his inventions. He made and lost several fortunes over the course of his career.

== Documentary ==
In 2002, a documentary film by Slovenian film director Karpo Godina was made about Florjančič's life story.
