= Eka Vogelnik =

- Born: 5 July 1946; Ljubljana
- Died: 6 November 2024 (aged 78)
- Citizenship: Slovenia
- Occupations: illustrator, costume, scenography, and puppet designer, puppeteer, director, university teacher

Eka Alenka Vogelnik (5 July 1946 – 6 November 2024) was a Slovene illustrator, costume, scenography, and puppet designer, puppeteer, director and university teacher.

== Career ==
Eka Vogelnik graduated in architecture and painting, and worked primarily as an illustrator, set and costume designer, as well as in puppet making and puppeteering. She illustrated over 30 books, was the artistic designer for more than 30 theatre productions, author of 7 puppet shows and numerous film and TV productions. In the later years of her career, she was involved mainly in developing different types of puppets and teaching puppetry.

== Films ==
Some of her puppet animated films, mostly using stop-motion animation are:

- Makalonca (based on a story by Fran Saleški Finžgar) 1994
- En prišparan tolar (A Tolar saved) 1999 (visually drawing on the Danse Macabre mural from Hrastovlje)
- Bisergora (Pearl Mountain) 2001
- Pozabljene knjige naših babic (The Forgotten Books of Our Grannies) series:

Mojca Pokraculja 2000
Trdoglav in Marjetica (Trdoglav and Marjetica) 2001
Butalci 2003
O šivilji in škarjicah (The Seamstress and Her Scissors) 2005
