= Tita Kovač Artemis =

Slovene chemist and writer

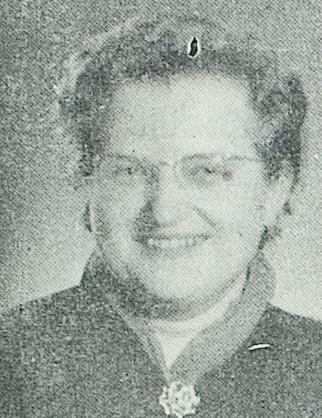
- Tita Kovač Artemis
- Born: 18 September 1930; Novo Mesto, Kingdom of Yugoslavia
- Died: 11 March 2016 (aged 85)
- Occupation: Chemist and writer
- Notable awards: Levstik Award; 1985 for Kemiki skozi stoletja

Tita Kovač Artemis (19 September 1930 – 11 March 2016) was a Slovene chemist and writer.

She won the Levstik Award in 1985 for her book Kemiki skozi stoletja (Chemists Through the Centuries).

She was best known for her documented biographical novels on Johann Weikhard von Valvasor Spomini baraona Valvasorja (Memoirs of Baron Valvasor), 1973; Stephen Dečanski Štefan Dečanski, 1974; Sigmund Zois Najbogatejši Kranjec (The Richest Carniolan), 1979; Janez Bleiweis Slovenski orator (The Slovene Orator), 1990; and Ioannis Kapodistrias Grški feniks (The Greek Phoenix), 2003.

In 1970 she moved to Greece where she lived and worked for many years until she moved to a retirement home near Topolšica in her native Slovenia.
