= Ani Bitenc =

Slovenian translator (1933–2024)

- Born: 27 November 1933; Kingdom of Yugoslavia
- Died: 12 November 2024 (aged 90)
- Education: University of Ljubljana
- Occupation: Translator

Ani Bitenc (27 November 1933 – 12 November 2024) was a Slovenian translator.

== Life and career ==
Bitenc was considered a pioneer of subtitle translation as a literary translator. She was regarded as responsible for the development of subtitle translation in modern Slovenia. She graduated from the University of Ljubljana with degrees in English and French.

Ani Bitenc began her translation career at Vesna Film. Bitenc was the head of the translation department at Television Ljubljana, later Television Slovenia, from its founding in 1974 until her retirement in 1994.

In 2013, she became the first recipient of the Breda Lipovšek Award for Lifetime Achievement. She was awarded it for her work in the field of film and television translation. In 2023 she became an honorary member of the Association of Slovenian Literary Translators (DSKP). In 1986 she was elected the first woman president of the organisation. As president she represented the association across Yugoslavia.

Bitenc died on 12 November 2024, at the age of 90.
