= Ignac Gregorač =

Slovenian architect, partisan, and author (1916–2016)

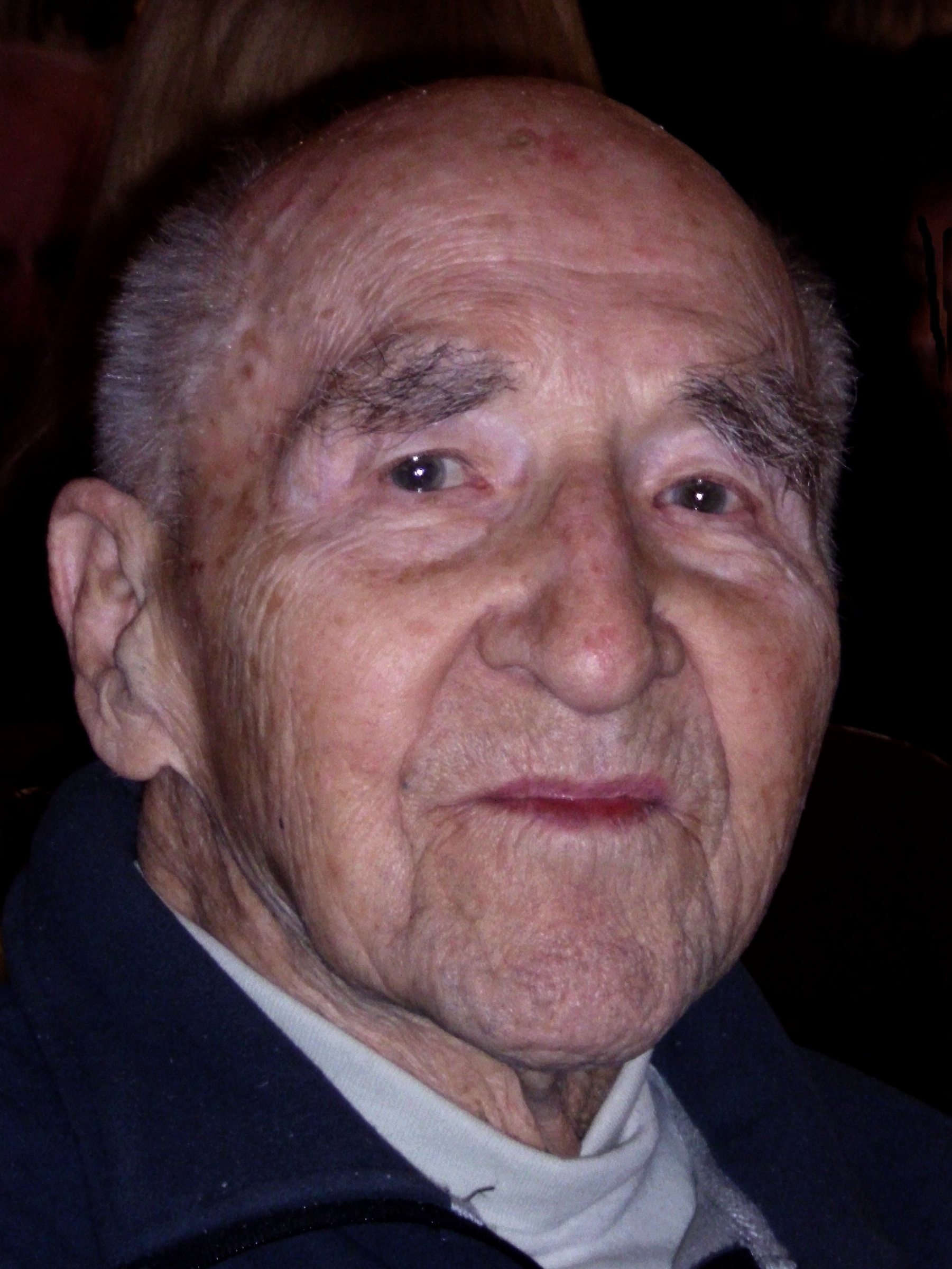
- Picture: February 12, 2012
- Born: June 24, 1916; Rijeka, Austria-Hungary
- Died: May 7, 2016 (aged 99); Ljubljana, Slovenia
- Other name: Vid (partisan nickname)
- Citizenship: Slovenia
- Occupations: architect, author

Ignac Gregorač (Partisan name Vid; June 24, 1916 – May 7, 2016), was a Slovenian architect, author, and recipient of the Commemorative Medal of the Partisans of 1941.

== Life and work ==
His family moved to Tacen after Gabriele D'Annunzio's conquest of Rijeka in 1920 and later to Ljubljana in 1923. He finished classical gymnasium in 1935 and graduated from the Technical Faculty of the University of Ljubljana in 1940, under the mentorship of Prof. Dr. Ivan Vurnik. During the studies he was active in progressive student associations. In 1941, he joined the Liberation Front of the Slovene Nation (OF), where he and his brother France (Cene) made and used a printing and documentation hideout in their own house. On June 15, 1942, he joined the Partisans, where he worked as a technical assistant, organizer and political activist in the Central Technical Section (CT)

He worked in the Partisan printing-press Triglav on the Gotenica Snežnik mountain from 1943 to 1944. After enabling the printing of Partisan bonds and Italian liras, he was transferred to the CT leadership in Stara Žaga as a group leader's assistant for the Graphic Department, and later as the leader of the Central Distribution Department. In October 1944, he was transferred to the main headquarters of the People's Liberation Army and Partisan Detachments of Yugoslavia (NOV-POJ), to OZNA, where he awaited the end of the WW2 on May 9, 1945, as an acting director of the fourth section. During the war, he was a candidate for the Communist Party of Slovenia (KPS) since October 1941 and a member since October 1943. He reached the rank of major, and after the war he was transferred to the reserve forces.

Between August 25 and November 26, 1945, he was appointed director of the National Film Company DFJ. After two months, on January 31, 1946, he returned to his profession as a designer in the Federal Architectural Bureau (ZPZ), where he also assisted in the restoration of King Alexander's palace in Belgrade (Dedinje) and the agricultural laboratory in Zemun.

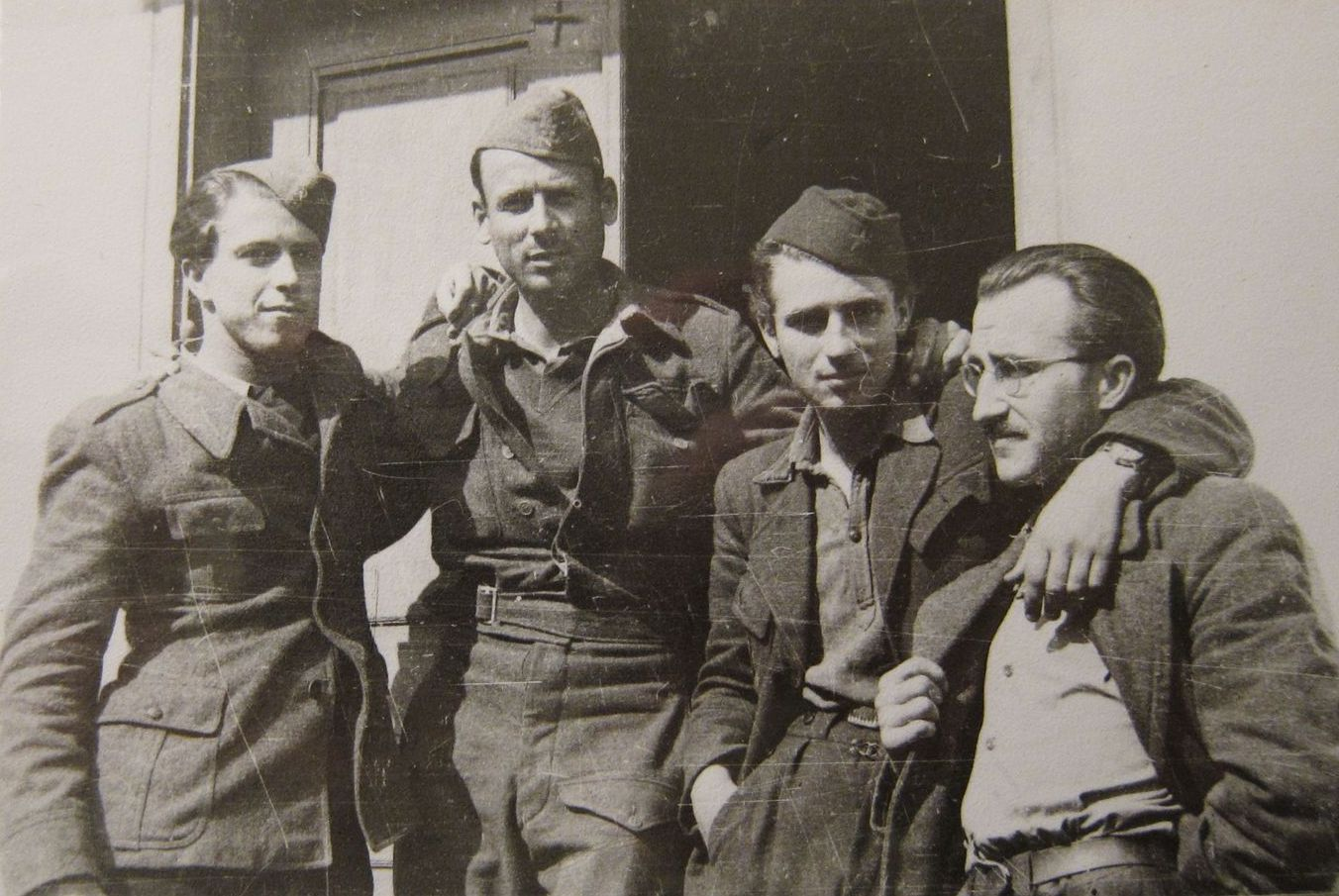
In front of the graphic studio in Črmošnjice, from left to right: the painter Ive Šubic, Branko Simčič, Ivan Melik, and Ignac Gregorač.

In February 1947, he joined the Yugoslavian technical and economic aid mission to Albania, where he met his future wife, the high-school teacher Ljubica Tafra from Šibenik, who also took part in the mission in the Ministry of Culture. He assisted the Albanian Infrastructure Ministry and also designed the wool processing factory in Tirana. In the fall of 1948, after the Cominform split, Albania stopped cooperating with Yugoslavia, so he returned to work in Belgrade at the Federal Ministry of Infrastructure.

Later he was transferred to the Internal Affairs Department of the Yugoslav State Security Administration (UDBA). From 1952 to 1953, he studied in Paris, where he specialized in planning hospital infrastructure. When he returned, he planned the Civil Protection Training Centre in Belgrade (Batajnica). Then he was transferred to the Foreign Affairs Department and supervised the construction of the then Yugoslav embassy in Washington on California Street between 1960 and 1961. Since December 28, 2001, the building has served as the Slovenian Embassy. He also provided the concept for the Yugoslav Embassy in Moscow.

In 1963, he returned to Ljubljana, the capital of the Yugoslav republic of Slovenia, which he had missed while living elsewhere. Here he worked as a senior advisor in the Ljubljanska banka Gospodarska banka Ljubljana, now SKB, until his retirement on September 1, 1972.

When he was back in Ljubljana, his fruitful publishing activity started. He had a lot of material from his wartime experiences, which he also portrayed in an article entitled "Življenje v tiskarski postojanki 11A Triglavski tiskarni" (The Life in the Printing Outpost 11A Triglav Printing Outpost published in the magazine Borec (Fighter).

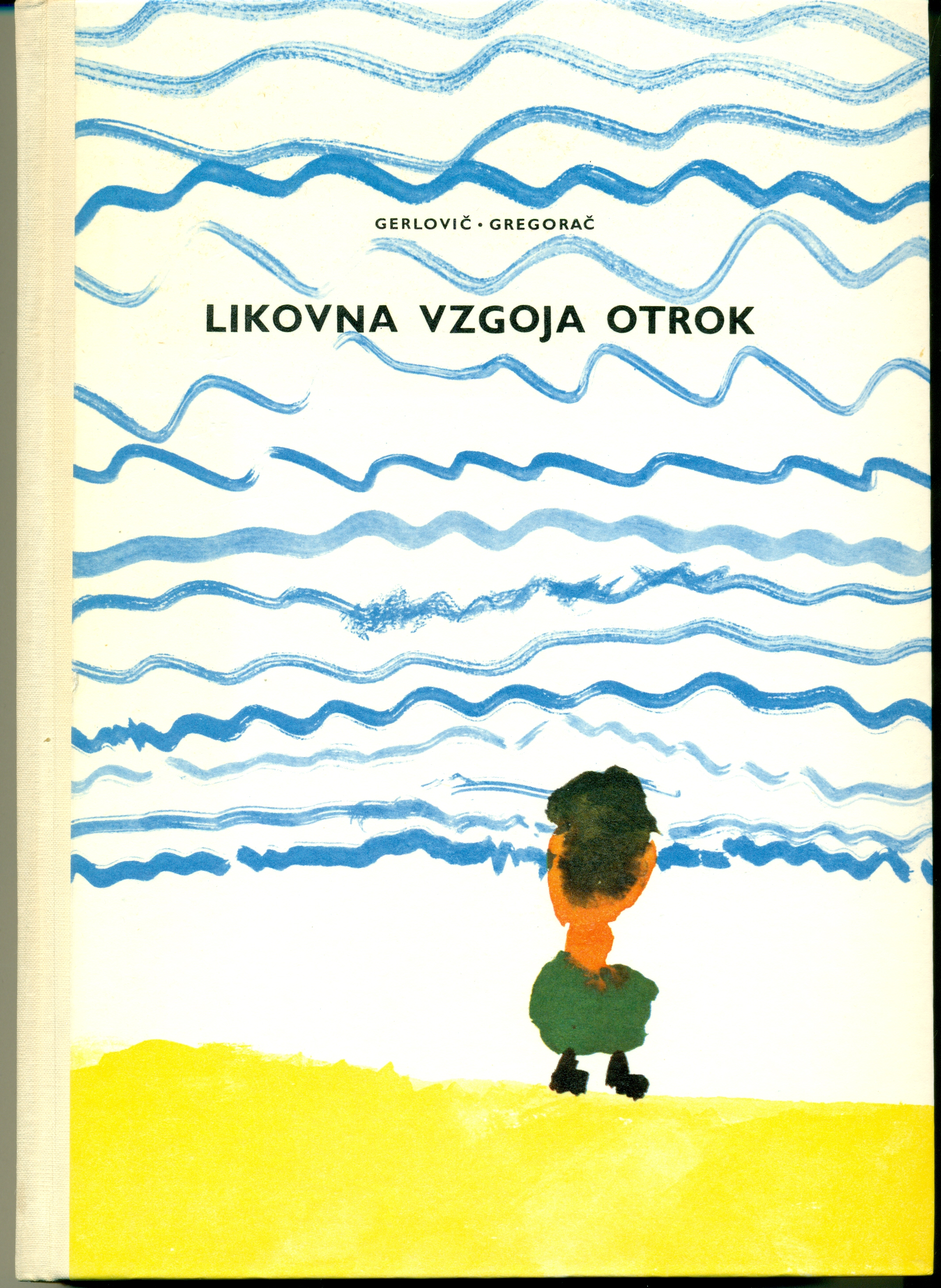
Likovna vzgoja otrok (Visual Arts Education for Children, 1968)

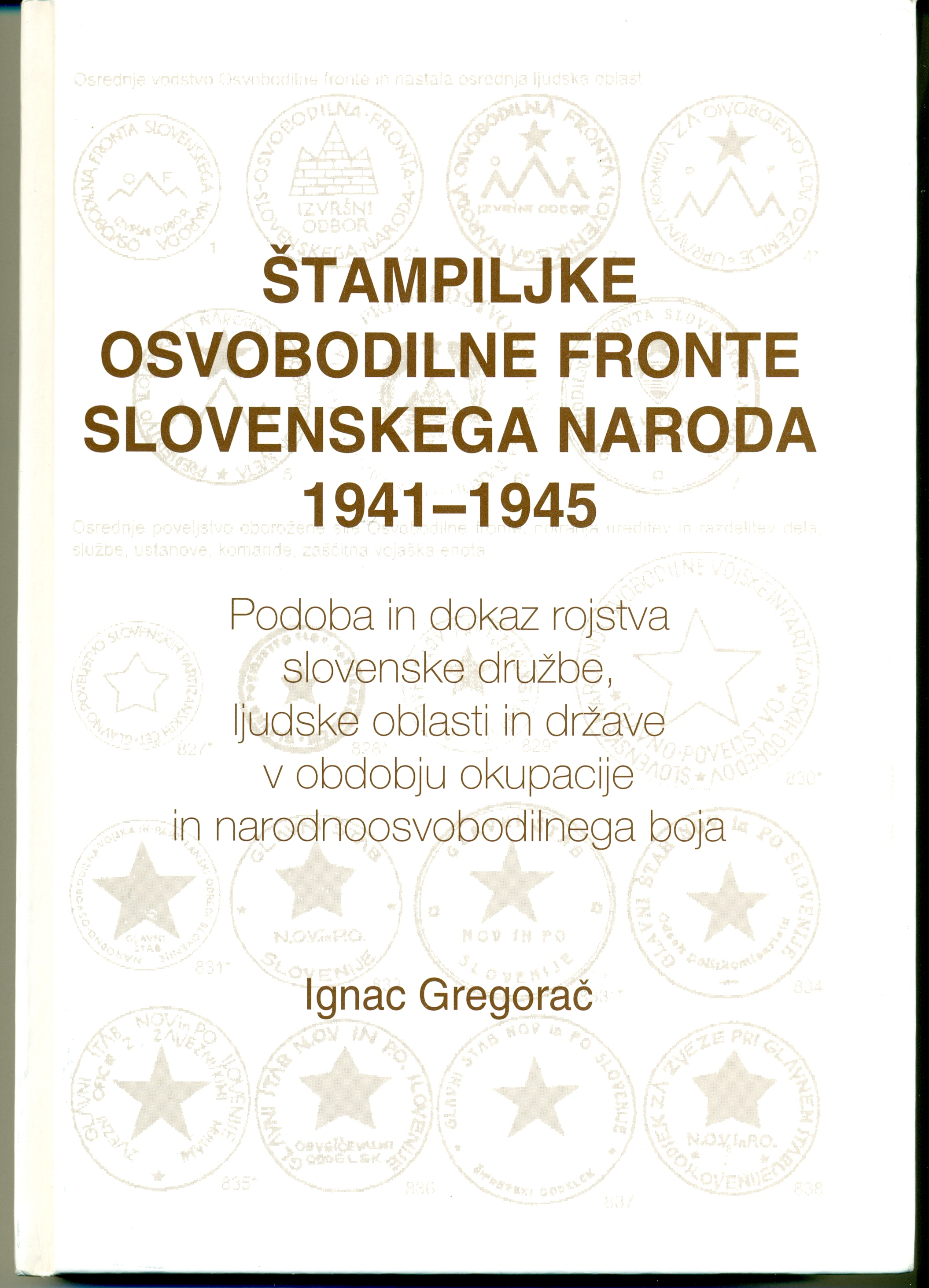
Štampiljke Osvobodilne fronte slovenskega naroda 1941–1945 (Stamps of the Liberation Front of the Slovene Nation, 1941–1945)

Together with the painter Alenka Gerlovič (1919–2010), he wrote Likovna vzgoja otrok (a.k.a. Likovni pouk otrok) (Visual Arts Education for Children, 1968). However, his most acclaimed book was Štampiljke Osvobodilne fronte slovenskega naroda, 1941 – 1945: podoba in dokaz rojstva slovenske družbe, ljudske oblasti in države v obdobju okupacije in narodnoosvobodilnega boja (1997)(Stamps of the Liberation Front of the Slovene Nation 1941–1945: Vision and Proof of the Birth of Slovenian Society, the People's Government, and the State during Occupation and National Liberation War), about which Janko Kostnapfel (2009) wrote: "Regarding its contents and production value, this work is at the level of a doctoral dissertation in history, social studies and technical sciences, and yet it is probably little known to other historians." He also made book design for both publications. In addition, he was active in responding to social polemics of the time and helped in the creation of the Encyclopedia of Slovenia.

Ignac Gregorač was not just an architect, draftsman, and designer, but also a writer of articles and two books, and a designer of museum exhibitions. He was a supporter for an unpolluted environment, active in social and political affairs and one of the founders of the movement Slovenska pot (Slovenian Way). Exact, analytical, and logical in his work, he was also in favour of the People's Front and Labour movements. He remained a proponent of humane, democratic, and just social society even after the collapse of communism in 1991.

The Ljubljana City Assembly awarded the Zlata plaketa illegalca (Golden Plaque of the Member of Underground Movement) to the Gregorač family, which he accepted in 1984. He was buried in the Ljubljana Cemetery on Friday, May 13, 2016, with military honours.

== Decorations, Medals, Plaques ==
Orders by rank:

- Commemorative Medal of the Partisans of 1941 (1944)
- 15) Order of Labour with Red Banner (I rank) (February 7, 1977)
- 20) Order of Merits for the People with Silver Rays (II rank)
- 21) Order of Brotherhood and Unity with Silver Wreath (II rank)
- 29) Order of Partisan Star with Rifles (III rank)
- 30) Order of Merits for the People with Silver Star (III rank)
- 33) Order of Labour with Silver Wreath (III rank)
- "10 Years of Yugoslav Army" Medal
- "30th Anniversary of the Monetary Institute" Medal
- Family Gregorač – Golden Plaque of the Member of Underground Movement (May 8, 1984)
