= COVID-19 pandemic in Slovenia =

Aspect of viral disease pandemic

- Disease: COVID-19
- Pathogen: SARS-CoV-2
- Location: Slovenia
- First outbreak: Wuhan, Hubei, China
- Index case: Ljubljana
- Arrival date: 4 March 2020 (6 years, 5 months and 4 days)
- Confirmed cases: 1,015,982
- Active cases: 11,092
- Hospitalized cases: 136
- Critical cases: 21
- Deaths: 6,613
- Fatality rate: 0.65%

Government website
- Government site National Institute of Public Health

The COVID-19 pandemic in Slovenia was a part of the pandemic of coronavirus disease 2019 (COVID-19) caused by severe acute respiratory syndrome coronavirus 2 (SARS-CoV-2). The first Slovenian citizen to be infected was resulted positive on 3 March 2020, the infection was contracted during an internal flight in Italy. The first case in Slovenia was confirmed a day later; it was an imported case transmitted by a tourist traveling from Morocco via Italy. Italy was the center of the SARS-CoV-2 in Europe at the time.

The first few days of the pandemic were challenging for Slovenia due to the resignation of Prime Minister Marjan Šarec in late January and the formation of a new government. The first case in Slovenia was confirmed one day after Janez Janša was elected prime minister. During the transition period, the outbreak escalated. A joint meeting between the outgoing and incoming governments was held on 10 March 2020. Marjan Šarec's outgoing caretaker government was responsible for the crisis management until 14 March 2020. On 15 May 2020, Slovenia became the first European nation to declare the end of the COVID-19 epidemic within its territory.

Slovenia's initial handling of the coronavirus outbreak was cited as a significant success when Europe faced the first wave of the pandemic, and earned praise for its effectiveness. In May 2020, Vox listed Slovenia, together with Jordan, Greece, Iceland and Vietnam as among the most effective in handling of the coronavirus outbreak.

However, the government neglected second wave warnings from experts and did not properly prepare the health care sector to cope with the second wave, which spread out of control for the administration, even after more than three months of lockdown, and in March 2021, Slovenia had the fourth highest death rate per capita in the world (according to data compiled by Johns Hopkins University).

As of 10 May 2022, 1,221,467 people in Slovenia have been fully vaccinated (around 57.9% of the population).

As of 4 February 2023, 3,021,521 COVID-19 vaccine doses have been administered in Slovenia.

== Background ==
On 12 January 2020, the World Health Organization (WHO) confirmed that a novel coronavirus was the cause of a respiratory illness in a cluster of people in Wuhan City, Hubei Province, China, which was reported to the WHO on 31 December 2019.

The case fatality ratio for COVID-19 has been much lower than SARS of 2003, but the transmission has been significantly greater, with a significant total death toll.

== Timeline ==
=== Testing before infection ===
- There were 313 tests performed between 7 January 2020 and 3 March 2020, all of them were negative. Note that this number is added to the total tests performed number above. Also, number of cases varies in different references, since Ministry of Health and National Institute of Public Health do not issue new data at the same time.

=== First Wave ===
==== March 2020 ====
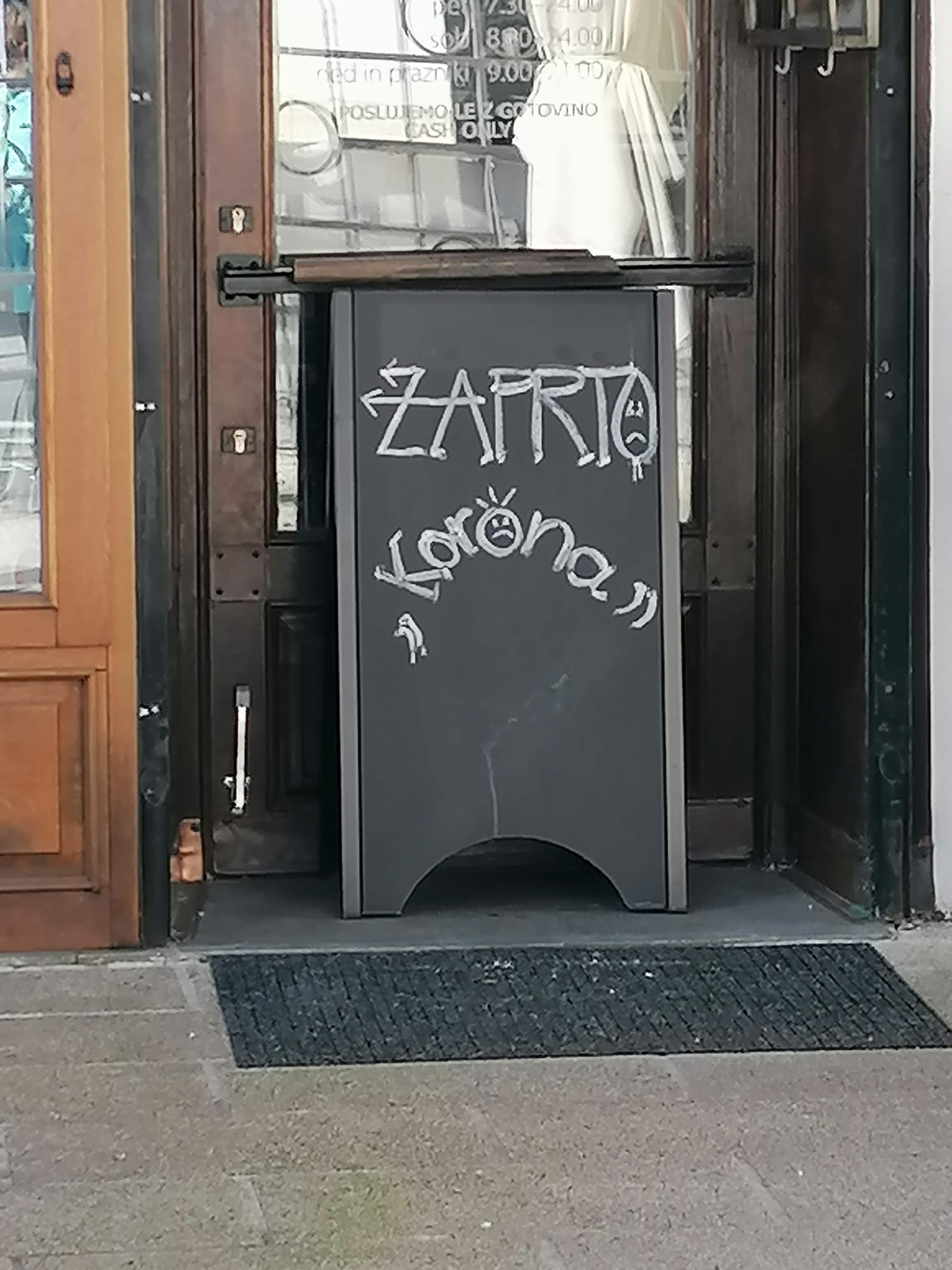
Text "Zaprto Korona" (Closed Corona) in front of a closed coffee shop, March 15, 2020, Novo Mesto

- 4 March 2020: First case, imported, a tourist traveling from Morocco via Italy.
- 5 March 2020: 5 new cases confirmed, two of them were in contact with the first case, others were imported from Italy as well.
- 6 March 2020: 2 cases confirmed also in Maribor, both medical personnel in the main hospital who contracted the illness on skiing holidays in Italy; Another patient is a medical doctor from Metlika, the source of his infection is also a trip to Italy. Total number of infected cases was 8.
- 7 March 2020: One of the patients was in contact with the doctor from Metlika, while the others have returned from traveling abroad (one each from Italy, Austria and Spain); government banned all public gatherings in closed spaces with 500 people or more; 4 new cases, 12 in total confirmed out of 785 tests.
- 8 March 2020: One of the patients was infected at her workplace in Switzerland, and has self-quarantined before she was tested; among the new cases were also three medical personnel from Metlika, who were in contact with the infected doctor; 4 new cases, 16 in total confirmed.
- 9 March 2020: One of the patients returned from Venice, others were medical personnel, some in contact with the doctor from Metlika; government further restricted public gatherings in closed spaces to events of 100 people or more; events in the open are restricted to 500 visitors; additionally, temperature checks were introduced at Ljubljana Jože Pučnik Airport and the border with Italy, 9 new cases, 25 in total confirmed.
- 10 March 2020: The government banned all incoming flights from Italy, South Korea, Iran and China to prevent further spread; the land border with Italy was closed for all but freight transport; 9 new cases, 34 in total confirmed.
- 11 March 2020: Civil Defence took over the coordination of the response; a primary school in Kamnik was closed for two weeks, to prevent spread from a teacher that tested positive. A teacher from the primary school in Šmarje pri Jelšah has been tested positive, and the school has been closed down. New infections were also reported from Murska Sobota and Postojna; 23 new cases, 57 in total confirmed.
- 12 March 2020: An epidemic was declared in Slovenia; the government announced that all educational institutions would be closed from 16 March onwards; medical personnel were prohibited from taking holidays; the first cases were reported from Nova Gorica and Kranj, 39 new cases, 89 in total confirmed.
- 13 March 2020: The new government took office; Crisis Management Staff (CMS) of the Republic of Slovenia in order to contain and manage the COVID-19 epidemic was established, led by Prime Minister Janez Janša; all non-urgent medical examinations were postponed; 45 new cases, in total 141 confirmed.
- 14 March 2020: CMS stopped public transport (effective from Monday, 16 March) and suspended all unnecessary services in the country; prices of safety equipment were frozen, to prevent inflation due to lack of supply; the government no longer tested all possible cases, but only those who were hospitalised to quarantine them; the total number of cases would be estimated based on the statistics from other countries (from percentage of those who are hospitalised); 40 new cases, in total 181 confirmed out of 5,369 tests; first death (a man from a nursing home in Metlika).
- 15 March 2020: The government closed all restaurants and bars effective 16 March. Public parking places in Ljubljana were made free for the time being. The Ljubljana Zoo closed down; 38 new cases, 219 total out of 6,156 tests.
- 16 March 2020: The government closed all restaurants and bars. Public parking places in Ljubljana, Maribor, Murska Sobota were made free for the time being; all educational institutions, including kindergartens, primary and secondary schools, closed down. 34 new cases, 253 total out of 6,712 tests (until 14:20). Infection with COVID-19 has been confirmed with one employee from nursing home in Štore and suspected with an employee from nursing home in Šmarje pri Jelšah; 12 more employees were ordered to self-isolate. 6 infections were confirmed among Red Cross volunteers taking body temperature of the travellers on the border crossings with Italy.
- 17 March 2020: There were 22 new confirmed cases, 275 total out of 7,857 tests. 4 infections were confirmed among the employees in Slovenj Gradec hospital, 17 employees were ordered to self-isolate. An employee of Adolf Drolc clinic in Maribor was tested positive. An employee of Kamnik clinic was tested positive. The suspected employee from Šmarje pri Jelšah nursing home was tested negative, no new cases were reported from the nursing home in Štore.
- 18 March 2020: There were 11 new confirmed cases, 286 total out of 8,730 tests. An outworker of the Dob pri Mirni penitentiary has been confirmed positive. An employee of Celje health centre has been confirmed infected. 23 employees of the Šmarje pri Jelšah nursing home have been tested for COVID-19, one test was confirmed positive. One occupant of the same nursing home started to show symptoms.
- 19 March 2020: There were 33 new confirmed cases, 319 total out of 9,860 tests.
- 20 March 2020: De facto quarantine (with some exemptions) was established in Slovenia; 22 new confirmed cases, 341 total out of 10,980 tests. So far, 21 positive cases in children all resulted in mild symptoms. In Šmarje pri Jelšah nursing home, infection has been confirmed with 4 employees and 7 occupants. A total of 31 cases were recorded in Šmarje pri Jelšah county. One case each was confirmed among employees in Murska Sobota and Izola hospitals.
- 21 March 2020: There were 42 new confirmed cases, 383 total out of 12,162 tests.
- 22 March 2020: There were 31 new confirmed cases, 414 total out of 13,098 tests; second death case confirmed (a 90-year-old woman from a nursing home in Metlika).
- 23 March 2020: There were 28 new confirmed cases, 442 in total out of 13,812 tests; third death confirmed (67-year-old man in UMC Ljubljana). The Slovenian government once again changed the methodology of testing. People over 60 and those with immune deficiencies and mild symptoms will now be tested. Until now only those who were hospitalized were tested.
- 24 March 2020: There were 38 new confirmed cases, 480 in total. Government abolished the Crisis Management Staff since the transition is ended and ministries can fully perform their duties now. Ten patients from Ljubljana UMC have reportedly recovered.
- 25 March 2020: There were 48 new confirmed cases, 528 in total. (the number was later corrected to 526)
- 26 March 2020: There were 1,181 tests carried out (total 17,294), of these 36 cases were positive, bringing the total number of infected persons to 562. One more person died, bringing the total number of victims to 6. 98 persons are hospitalized, 17 of them require intensive care.
- 27 March 2020: There were 1,075 tests carried out (total 18,369), of these 70 were positive, bringing the total number of infected persons to 632. Three more persons died, bringing the total number of victims to 9. 90 persons are hospitalized, 22 of them require intensive care.
- 29 March 2020: 46 more positive tests (total 20,753), bringing the total number of infected persons to 730. Two more persons died, bringing the number of victims to 11. 101 persons are hospitalized, 23 of them require intensive care.
- 30 March 2020: 26 more positive tests (total 21,349), bringing the total number of infected persons to 756. None died. 115 persons are hospitalized, 28 of them require intensive care. 108 out of total 756 infected persons are health workers, 24 of them work in nursing homes.
- 31 March 2020: 46 more positive tests (total 22,474), bringing the total number of infected persons to 802. Four persons died, bringing the total number of cases to 15. 119 persons are hospitalized, 28 of them require intensive care.

==== April 2020 ====
7-day prevalence in Slovenian municipalities per 100k inhabitants

- 1 April 2020: There were 1,288 tests carried out (23,762 total), 39 of them were positive, bringing the total number of infected persons to 841. Two more persons have died, bringing the total to 16. 111 persons are hospitalized, 31 of them require intensive care. Slovenia received a shipment of 1 million surgical masks and 200,000 FFP2 respirators from the government of the Czech Republic.
- 2 April 2020: The number of infected persons rose to 897. 112 persons are hospitalized, 29 of them require intensive care. For comparison, the 2018–19 seasonal flu in Slovenia took 160 victims up to 2 April 2019.
- 3 April 2020: 37 more positive tests brought the number of infected persons to 934. Four more persons have died, bringing the total to 20.
- 4 April 2020: The number of infected persons rose to 977. Two more persons have died, bringing the total to 22.
- 5 April 2020: 665 tests were carried out, 20 of them positive, bringing the total number of infected persons to 997. Six more people died, bringing the total to 28. 108 people are hospitalized, 31 of them requiring intensive care.
- 6 April 2020: 489 tests were carried out, 24 of them positive, bringing the total number of infected persons to 2,021 (the number has been later corrected to 120). Two more persons have died, bringing the total to 30. 114 persons are hospitalized, 30 of them requiring intensive care.
- 7 April 2020: 1,202 tests were carried out (total 29,455), 35 of them positive, bringing the total number of infected persons to 1,055. Six more persons died, bringing the total to 36. 111 persons are hospitalized, 31 of them requiring intensive care. 189 infected persons are health workers, 219 are nursing home occupants.
- 8 April 2020: 1,214 tests were carried out (total 30,669), 36 of them positive, bringing the total number of infected persons to 1,091. Four more persons have died, bringing the total to 40. 111 persons are hospitalized, 35 of them requiring intensive care, 5 more persons were dismissed from hospitals, bringing the total number of persons dismissed from hospitals to 120.
- 9 April 2020: 33 new infections were confirmed, bringing the total number of infected persons to 1124. Three more persons have died, bringing the total to 43. 108 persons are hospitalized, 34 of them requiring intensive care. 8 more people were dismissed from hospitals. 208 of the infected persons are health workers, 72 work in nursing homes, 225 are nursing home occupants.

==== May 2020 ====
As of 15 May 2020, Slovenia was the first country in Europe to declare that its epidemic was over (as of the end of May). As a result, some government support measures, such as financial aid to citizens and firms hit by the coronavirus, expired at the end of May.

==== July 2020 ====
In July, cases began to rise once again, and are no longer only coming from abroad. On 3 July 2020, 30 new cases were reported, the highest number since 16 April 2020, suggesting the possibility of a second wave. The labor committee approved a bill on intervention measures in preparation for the second wave, which provides the basis for an app for tracking infected people.

=== Second Wave ===
==== September 2020 ====
Second wave began and government issued a decree that wearing masks indoors is again mandatory. After 21 September 2020 all shops, bars, clubs, restaurants and pubs had to be closed no later than at 22:00. The third wave began.

== Crisis Management Staff ==
Staff was abolished on 24 March 2020. Duties were transferred on responsible ministries.

- Head: Prime Minister Janez Janša
- Secretary: Andrej Rupnik
- Spokesperson: Jelko Kacin
- Members
  - government ministers
  - Commander of Civil Defence Srečko Šestan
  - other experts

== Statistics ==
=== Average number of cases per day and % of deaths among confirmed cases ===
Number of cases per day			% of deaths among confirmed cases
All-time average	14-day average	5-day average	% of deaths among confirmed cases
15.73	0.79	1.20	7.30 %

== People ==
- Aleš Šabeder, Minister of Health in the 13th government; led the crisis response until the 14th government took office, held the first press conference announcing the details of the first case, later held press conferences several times a day; took the first measures (limiting public gatherings to 500 and then 100 people; prohibited medical personnel from taking holidays during the epidemic; closed the border with Italy for body temperature control)
- Nina Pirnat, director of the National Institute of Public Health; assisted minister Šabeder during the outbreak, daily delivered information on new cases
- Simona Repar Bornšek, State Secretary in Ministry of Health in the 13th government
- Srečko Šestan, Commander of the Civil Defence of Slovenia; took over the coordination of the response on 11 March 2020
- Andrej Šter, Head of the Consular Service in the Ministry of Foreign Affairs; arranging returns home for Slovenians abroad
- Tomaž Gantar, Minister of Health in the 14th government
- Jelko Kacin, Chief Spokesperson during the crisis, held daily press conferences
- Anže Logar, Minister of Foreign Affairs in the 14th government

== See also ==
- COVID-19 pandemic by country and territory
- COVID-19 pandemic in Europe
- COVID-19 pandemic in Austria
- COVID-19 pandemic in Croatia
- COVID-19 pandemic in Hungary
- COVID-19 pandemic in Italy
- COVID-19 pandemic in Romania
- COVID-19 pandemic in Serbia
- COVID-19 pandemic in Slovakia
