= Timeline of Slovenian history =

This is a timeline of Slovenian history, comprising important legal and territorial changes and political events in Slovenia and its predecessor states. To read about the background to these events, see History of Slovenia. See also the list of presidents of Slovenia.

== third century BC ==
Year	Date	Event
250 BC		The Celtic La Tène culture comes to the territories of modern Slovenia, replacing the Hallstatt culture.
221 BC		The border of the Roman Republic arrives at the Julian Alps.

== second century BC ==
Year	Date	Event
181 BC		The Roman foundation of Aquileia marks the beginning of a gradual conquering of the territories of modern Slovenia by the Romans.
178 BC		Romans conquer Histria. Subsequently, in 129 BC, they subjugated the Taurisci people and in 115 BC the Carni people.

== first century BC ==
Year	Date	Event
48 BC		Noricans take the side of Julius Caesar (c. 100–44 BC) in the civil war against Pompey (106–48 BC).
16 BC		Noricans, having joined with the Pannonians in invading Histria, are defeated by Publius Silius, proconsul of Illyricum.
12 BC		The army of Romans, led by Tiberius (42–37 BC, reigned 14–37), starts conquering Pannonia.
9 BC		Pannonia is subdued and incorporated with Illyricum, the frontier of which was thus extended as far as the Danube.

== first century ==
Year	Date	Event
7		Pannonians, with the Dalmatians and other Illyrian tribes, revolt, and are overcome by Tiberius and Germanicus (15 BC–19 AD), after a hard-fought campaign which lasted for two years.
9		The Roman Empire finally conquers Pannonia (which includes the biggest part of present-day Slovenia). Roman legions stay in Poetovio (modern Ptuj).
40		The Noricum Kingdom is ultimately incorporated to the Roman Empire by the Roman caesar Claudius (10 BC–54 AD, reigned 41–54). Noricum includes Carinthia and most of Styria. Hence, the entire territory of modern Slovenia is within the borders of the Roman Empire.
46		Celeia (modern Celje) gets its municipal rights under the name municipium Claudia Celeia.

== second century ==
Year	Date	Event
103		Roman caesar Trajan (53–117, reigned 98–117) moves the Legio XIII Gemina to the north border in Karnunt (Carnuntum) (today Deutsch Altenburg in Lower Austria) in Pannonia along the Danube River.

== third century ==
Year	Date	Event
290		Noricum is divided under Roman Emperor Diocletian (245–313, reigned 284–305) into Noricum Ripense (along the Danube) and Noricum Mediterraneum (the southern mountainous district).

== fourth century ==
Year	Date	Event
320		Celeia is incorporated with Aquileia (Oglej) under Roman Emperor Constantine I. (272–337, reigned 307–337).

== sixth century ==
Year	Date	Event
550		The first wave of Slavic settlement, originating from Moravia, reaches the Eastern Alps region and the western margin of the Pannonian plain.
568		Lombards leave the territories of modern Slovenia and the borderlands of Pannonia, moving into Italy.
585		The second and most important wave of Slavic settlement takes place. Slavs and Avars settle in Eastern Alps (Julian Alps, Karavanke), eventually occupying an area more than twice the size of today's Slovenia. Slavic settlement is proven by the decline of dioceses in the Eastern Alpine region in second half of the sixth century, as well as in the change of population, the material culture and the linguistic identity of the area.

== seventh century ==
Year	Date	Event
610		Avars attempt to invade Italy. After their power is weakened, a relatively independent March of Slavs (Marca Vinedorum) appears.
623		Uprising of Slavs led by Samo^{1} against Avars. Samo's Tribal Union is formed.
631		The Battle of Wogastisburg (probably Forchheim) between Samo's army and Austrasian forces, led by Merovingian king Dagobert I of the Franks (603–639, reigned 629–639).
658		Samo's death. The Tribal Union declines, but a part of the March of Slavs maintains independence and becomes known in historical sources under the name of Carantania. The center of Karantania was Zollfeld, north of modern Klagenfurt.

== eighth century ==
Year	Date	Event
745		Karantania loses its independence and becomes a margraviate and tantamount part of the semifeudal Frankish empire later under the rule of king Charlemagne (742–814, reigned 771–814) due to pressing danger of Avar tribes from the east.
796		The Slavic duke of Carniola, Vojnomir, aids the Carolingian duke Eric of Friuli against the Avars.
796		The Synod ad ripas Danuvii convoked by Charlemagne's son Pepin and presided over by Paulinus II of Aquileia establishes the Roman Catholic Archdiocese of Salzburg detaching it from the northernmost territory of the Patriarchate of Aquileia. The synod focuses on the evangelization of the Slavs.
798		Salzburg is raised to the rank of an archdiocese

== ninth century ==
Year	Date	Event
811		The southern boundary of the archdiocese of Salzburg is moved south to the Drava river at the expense of the Patriarchate of Aquileia.
840		The Balaton Principality emerges in Pannonia.
843		Karantania passes into the hands of Louis the German (804–876).
871		The earliest written record of the ancient Karantanian ritual of installing dukes Conversio Bagoariorum et Carantanorum, where is written: ... illi eum ducem fecerunt... (they were made dukes).
876		The principality of Prince Kocelj (Balaton Principality) loses its independence.
887		Arnulf of Carinthia (850–899) a grandson of Louis the German assumes his title of King of the East Franks and becomes the first Duke of Carinthia.
894		Great Moravia probably loses a part of its territory—present-day Western Hungary—to Arnulf of Carinthia, who failed to conquer Great Moravia in 892, 893, 894/895 and 899.
895		Accord between Arnulf of Carinthia and the Bohemian Duke Bořivoj (reigned 870–895), Bohemia is freed from the danger of invasion.
896		Finno-Ugric Magyars, led by Árpád, settle in the Pannonian plain. The centre of their settlement becomes the region around the Theiss River (Hungary).
899		Arnulf of Carinthia dies.

== 10th century ==
Year	Date	Event
906		Invading Magyars destroy the weakened empire of Great Moravia.
907		Slovene territory is settled by Magyars.
952		The Great Carantania. (to 1180)
955		German king Otto I (912–973, reigned 936–973) defeats the Magyars at the Battle of Lechfeld near Augsburg, halting their advance in Central Europe.
976		The March of Austria is established. Carantania becomes a duchy in its own right, including Styria and today's East Tirol
1000		Carinthia, Styria and Carniola provinces emerge on the territory of Carantania.
1000		The Freising Manuscripts, the first Latin-script continuous text in a Slavic language and the oldest document in Slovene, are written.

== 12th century ==
Year	Date	Event
1112		The first record mentions Ljubljana by its modern name (by its German name Castrum Laibach). (to 1125)
1122		The first mention of Celje in the early Middle Ages under the name of Cylie in Admont's Chronicle. (to 1137)
1164		The first mention of Maribor as Castrum Marchburch.

== 13th century ==
Year	Date	Event
1269		The Carantanian dynasty becomes extinct.
1274		Bohemian king Ottokar II. (reigned as a king 1253–1278) a candidate for the German throne refuses to appear or to restore the provinces of Austria, Styria, Carinthia and Carniola, which he has seized.
1282		The rule of Habsburg dukes over most Slovene lands begins.

== 14th century ==
Year	Date	Event
1335		The Duchy of Carinthia is bestowed by Louis the Bavarian on the dukes of Austria.

== 15th century ==
Year	Date	Event
1414		The Habsburg Duke Ernest the Iron (1377–1424) thrones according to the ancient Karantanian ritual of installing dukes on the Duke's Stone and he addresses again as an archduke.
1451		Celje acquires town rights by orders from Frederick II, the Count of Celje.
1461		Ljubljana becomes the seat of a diocese.
1473		The city walls and a defensive moat are built in Celje.

== 16th century ==
Year	Date	Event
1511		Ljubljana is devastated by an earthquake.
1532		The Siege of Maribor ends in a defensive victory.
1550		Primož Trubar publishes the first books in Slovene, Catechismus and Abecedarium.
1566		The region of Prekmurje is occupied by Ottomans during the Siege of Szigetvar.
1583		Jurij Dalmatin translates to Slovene and publishes the Bible.
1593		The Battle of Sisak restores the balance of power and brings the expansion of the Ottoman Empire into the Slovene Lands to a halt.

== 17th century ==
Year	Date	Event
1622	5 May	An earthquake occurs near Ljubljana. It measures about 5 on the Moment magnitude scale or 4.9 on the Richter scale,
1688		The Prekmurje region is occupied by Austrians.
1693		The scholarly society Academia operosorum Labacensis is established in Ljubljana.

== 18th century ==
Year	Date	Event
1701		The Philharmonic Society (Academia philharmonicorum) is established in Ljubljana.

== 19th century ==
Year	Date	Event
1809		Lower Carinthia incorporates to France as Duchy of Carinthia was divided into two parts, Upper or Western Carinthia and Lower or Eastern.
1813		Lower Carinthia is re-conquered.
1821		Congress of Laibach takes place in Ljubljana.
1838		First works, tracings on Slovene territory of a railway route Vienna – Trieste in a so-called "Southern Railway" (Južna železnica) begin.
1845		First works on the "Southern Railway" between Celje and Ljubljana begin,
1846	27 April	First locomotive of the "Southern Railway" comes to Celje.
1846	18 May	Trial run of the first train on the "Southern Railway" to Celje is performed.
1846	2 June	The "Southern Railway" to Celje is open for public.
1848		The United Slovenia (Zedinjena Slovenija), the first Slovene political programme rises.
1848	18 April	The Ljubljana railway station is finished.
1849		The Duchy of Carinthia is created as a separate crownland.
1849	18 August	First locomotive arrives at Ljubljana railway station.
1849	16 September	First train of the "Southern Railway" arrives in Ljubljana.
1849	19 September	"Southern Railway" to Ljubljana is ceremonially opened.
1850	14 May	Emperor Francis Joseph lays the foundation stone of Trieste railway station.
1851		Hermagoras Society (Mohorjeva družba), the first Slovene publisher, is established in Klagenfurt and publishes books in Slovene.
1857	18 July	The "Carinthian railway" between Maribor and Klagenfurt is being built.
1857	27 July	The "Southern Railway" is completed and opened.
1862	12 November	The railway line of the "Carintnhian railway" on the route Maribor – Vuzenica is built.
1863	31 May	The "Carinthian railway" is built
1864		The Kosler brothers establish the Pivovarna Union (The Union Brewery).
1869	17 May	Rally at Vižmarje near Ljubljana gathers around 30,000 people where programme of the United Slovenia is demanded.
1889	July	Strike of coal miners in the Central Sava Valley in Zagorje and Trbovlje.
1890		The railway line on the route Radgona – Ljutomer is built.
1890	1 May	Labour Day is celebrated first time.
1891		The railway line on the route Ljubljana – Kamnik is built.
1891		The railway line on the route Celje – Velenje is built.
1894		First public power station in Škofja Loka is built.
1894		The railway line on the route Ljubljana – Novo Mesto is built.
1895		People's loan bank (Ljudska posojilnica) is founded by Catholic middle class.
1895		Ljubljana earthquake
1896		The National hall (Narodni dom) is built in Celje.
1898		The railway line on the route Ljubljana – Kočevje is built.
1899		The railway line on the route Velenje – Dravograd is built.
1899		The Maribor National Hall is built.
1900		Liberal middle class founds the first Slovene bank, The Credit bank of Ljubljana (Ljubljanska kreditna banka).

== 20th century ==
Year	Date	Event
1902		First telephone is mounted in Celje.
1907		Electricity is used in a lead mine in Mežica.
1907		The Celje hall (Celjski dom) is built in Celje.
1908		The "Karavanken railway" is built.
1912		The Preporod (Rebirth), a juvenile movement is established. Many members have political connections with the pro-Serb organization Young Bosnia (Mlada Bosna).
1912		A hydroelectric station in Završnica (2,500 kW) is being built. (to 1915)
1913		Celje is electrified. Westen's dishes factory uses electricity in industry.
1913	12 April	Ivan Cankar in Ljubljana gives a speech Slovenes and Yugoslavs for the socialist society Vzajemnost (Mutuality) about Slovenes to unite politically but not culturally with other South Slavs and Yugoslavism.
1914		The railway on the route Novo Mesto – Karlovac begins to run.
1914	28 June	Austrian Archduke Franz Ferdinand, heir to the Austrian throne, and his wife Countess Sophie, are killed in Sarajevo, Bosnia at the hands of a pro-Serb nationalist assassin (a Bosnian Serb student Gavrilo Princip, a member of the Young Bosnia). World War I begins.
1915		The Soča River front. In 11 Soča offensives Italians captured just Gorizia (Gorica) and a few frontier sites. On these battlefields many Slovenes in Austro-Hungarian army died (for example at the Battle of Doberdò). (to 1918)
1917	30 May	May Declaration of Slovene, Croatian and Serb representatives in the Vienna parliament signed by Anton Korošec about arrangement of a unified common state of Slovenes, Croats, and Serbs living within the Habsburg monarchy.
1917	20 July	The Corfu Declaration is signed between the Yugoslav committee (Jugoslovanski odbor) and the Serb government and becomes the basis for the formation of the Yugoslav state.
1917	24 October	The Battle of Kobarid between Austrian forces, reinforced by German units and the Italian army. The Italian army withdraws to the Piave River, where they blocked the enemy before the arrive of the military assistance of the British and French. (to 9 November)
1918		Nitrogen factory (Tovarna dušika) in Ruše is built.
1918		A hydroelectric station Fala on the Drave river (31,150 kW) is built.
1918	6 October	State of Slovenes, Croats and Serbs is established in Zagreb. It becomes the political representative body of South Slavs in Austria-Hungary.
1918	29 October	State of Slovenes, Croats and Serbs breaks off all relations with Austria-Hungary and proclaims a short-lived State of Slovenes, Croats and Serbs. Slovenia joins a new state with an independent State authority. The state is not recognized internationally.
1918	1 November	General Rudolf Maister takes over the authority of the Maribor garrison.
1918	3 November	Austria-Hungary surrenders.
1918	18 November	Germany surrenders. World War I ends.
1918	1 December	The State of Slovenes, Croats and Serbs joins with the Kingdom of Serbia and the Kingdom of Montenegro to form the Kingdom of Serbs, Croats and Slovenes (SHS). Today it is believed that this was a great historical fault although at that time this was probably the only sensible decision because Italy according to the London Pact with the victorious Entente forces from 1915 without bias occupied Primorska, Istria (Istra) and Zadar in Dalmatia and Serbia was pressing for unification.
1919		The University of Ljubljana (Univerza v Ljubljani) is established.
1919	18 January	The Paris Peace Conference begins. Woodrow Wilson gives his "14 Points" address. The ninth and the 10th are crucial for Slovenes within former Austro-Hungarian borders.
1919	28 June	The Treaty of Versailles is signed between Germany and victorious three Entente powers.
1919	10 September	The Treaty of Saint-Germain with republic of Austria. It confirms the break of Austria-Hungary. Its territory comes down to newly formed countries Austria, Hungary, Czechoslovakia, Poland, Romania, and the Kingdom of Serbs, Croats and Slovenes. South Tyrol with its German population and Trentino fall to Italy.
1920		The "Kulturbund"—a cultural and educational organization of German national minority—is established. Later becomes the nazi organization, which operates in Yugoslavia as a fifth column.
1920	4 June	The Treaty of Trianon with Hungary Burgenland (Gradiščansko) falls to Austria and Transmuraland (Prekmurje) to the Kingdom of Serbs, Croats and Slovenes.
1920	13 July	Croatian National hall in Pula and Slovene national hall in Trieste are burned down by Italian fascists.
1920	14 August	A security agreement is signed between Czechoslovakia and the Kingdom of Serbs, Croats and Slovenes.
1920	10 October	Carinthian Plebiscite.
1920	12 November	The Treaty of Rapallo between Italy and the Kingdom of Serbs, Croats and Slovenes, where Slovenia loses almost the whole province of Primorska, which is incorporated back again after the Second World War. Italy also gets the whole Istria together with the Trieste region (Tržaško).
1921	28 June	St. Vitus Day Constitution (Vidovdanska ustava) is adopted. It legalizes a monarchal regulation and centralism in a new state and also the supremacy of the court and the Serb politics linked with it.
1921	July	An allied treaty for insurance of a situation in East Europe, attained in the Paris Peace Conference, is made by Romania and the Kingdom of Serbs, Croats and Slovenes. This alliance supplements the security agreement between Czechoslovakia and the Kingdom of Serbs, Croats and Slovenes and gets the name "Little Entente".
1922		Julian March (Julijska krajina) is incorporated to Italy.
1923	March	Prefect of Julian March interdicts Slovene and Croatian language at the administration.
1925	15 October	Italian king issues a decree, which interdicts Slovene and Croatian language also at courts of justice.
1927		Founding of the TIGR at Goriško, Slovene anti-fascist organisation, first such European organization and a secret youth organization Borba (The fight) at the Trieste region.
1929	6 January	The king Alexander I. with a coup d'état dissolves the parliament and establishes the 6 January Dictatorship. He abolishes the St. Vitus Day constitution, freedom of the press and the pooling rights.
1929	3 October	The king Alexander I renames the Kingdom of Serbs, Croats and Slovenes as the Kingdom of Yugoslavia. All political parties are prohibited.
1930		Italian fascists discover some TIGR's cells and five members of TIGR (other sources of Borba) are killed at Bazovica.
1931	9 May	To hide a dictatorship the king Alexander I. initiates the bestowal constitution, which introduces the two-chamber parliament.
1933	16 February	The Little Entente formed between Romania, the Kingdom of Yugoslavia and Czechoslovakia.
1934	9 February	The Balkan Entente formed between Romania, the Kingdom of Yugoslavia, Greece and Turkey.
1934	9 October	The king Alexander I. Karađorđević, who reigned since 1921, is assassinated in Marseille together with a French foreign minister Louis Barthou by Croatian extremist nationalists.
1935		Milan Stojadinović becomes prime minister. His government begins to drop Yugoslavia's traditional leaning toward France and starts to connect economically and politically with Germany and Italy.
1937		The National Academy of Sciences and Arts is established in Ljubljana.
1938		Some members of TIGR plan an attempt on Italian Fascist leader Benito Mussolini's life, when he visits Kobarid.
1938	13 March	Adolf Hitler annexes Austria to the Nazi Germany. Slovenes in Austrian Carinthia practically become German citizens.
1938	December	Dragiša Cvetković becomes prime minister. He signs an agreement with the leader of Croatian opposition Vladko Maček allowing for the foundation of the Banovina of Croatia as the sole autonomous political and territorial unit in the Kingdom of Yugoslavia. This agreement does not solve the national problem since it just distributes the authority among Serbs and Croats.
1941	6 April	German, Italian and Hungarian occupying forces occupy Slovenia and divide it into three parts.
1941	11 April	German army occupies the Central Sava Valley, where important pits, heavy industry and traffic crossroads lie.
1941	17 April	Royal Yugoslav army signs its surrender in Belgrade.
1941	19 April	A Nazi politician and SS chief leader Heinrich Himmler visits Celje and among other he inspects the prison of the Stari pisker ("Old pot").
1941	26 April	An anti-fascist organization, the Liberation Front of Slovene nation (Osvobodilna fronta Slovenskega naroda) (OF) is established in Ljubljana. It is active on all Slovene ethnical territory, as well in Carinthia, Primorska region in the Venetian province and Slovene Rába region (Slovene Slovensko Porabje, Hungarian Szlovén-vidék or Rába-vidék).
1941	8 May	A decision about the organization of the OF in the Central Sava Valley in Trbovlje, Zagorje and Hrastnik is adopted.
1941	July	Armed resistance begins.
1941	1 August	The first Slovene Partisan unit in the Central Sava Valley, the Revirje company (Revirska četa) is established at the Čemšeniška Alpine meadow. 70 fighters were counted.
1941	12 December	A battle between German policemen and Slovene partisans near the village of Rovte.
1943	1 March	Dolomiti Declaration.
1943	16 September	The supreme plenum of OF proclaims the association of Slovene maritime province (Slovensko primorje) to Slovenia.
1943	29 November	Second session of AVNOJ in Jajce.
1945	2 May	Troops of Yugoslav 4th Army together with Slovene 9th Corpus NOV, New Zealand units and Italian resistance liberate Trieste.
1945	5 May	First postwar Slovene national government is named and elected by the SNOS (Slovene National Liberation Council) at the Bratina Hall in Ajdovščina.
1945	8 May	British 8th Army together with Slovene partisan troops and motorized detachment of Yugoslav 4th Army arrives to Carinthia and Klagenfurt.
1945	9 May	General Alexander Löhr Commander of German Army Group E near Topolšica, Slovenia signs unconditional capitulation of German occupation troops. World War II in Slovenia ends.
1945	25 May	Forced repatriation of Slovene military and civilians from Viktring, Austria to various postwar execution sites including the Kočevski Rog massacre and the Teharje camp.
1945	12 June	Trieste stops being under the administration of Yugoslav army.
1947	10 February	21 countries sign the Paris peace conference with Italy.
1947	15 September	Free Territory of Trieste (STO – Svobodno tržaško ozemlje) is established in Ljubljana.
1948	18 March	Soviet Union calls back all its specialists from Yugoslavia. The Communist Party of the Soviet Union accuses the Communist Party of Yugoslavia of not being democratic, that it leans toward imperial powers, that returns to capitalism, and that it diverts from Marxism. The Informbiro begins. Economic blockade and a threat of military intervention follow.
1954		Free Territory of Trieste expires after the London Memorandum is signed between the US, Great Britain, Italy and Yugoslavia. Trieste becomes Italian. Slovenia gets the north of Istria.
1955		Informbiro ends. Josip Broz Tito and Nikita Khrushchev sign the Belgrade declaration, which also recognizes a Yugoslav form of socialism.
1978		The "South railway" is electrified.
1980	4 May	Tito dies at the Ljubljana University Medical Centre.
1990	22 April	Milan Kučan wins the presidential election, which is still held within the SFR Yugoslavia.
1990	23 December	A referendum on independence is held. 88.5% of the eligible electorate (and 94.8% of the participating electorate) votes for independence from Yugoslavia.
1991	25 June	Slovenia becomes an independent state by adopting and approving relevant official documents.
1991	26 June	Slovenia ceremonially declares its independence from SFR Yugoslavia.
1991	26 June	Slovenia removes Yugoslav border signs and marks its own. The Yugoslav People's Army sends 2,000 soldiers from barracks across Slovenia to reclaim all border checkpoints and the Ten-Day War starts.
1991	27 June	The Yugoslav People's Army takes over border posts, but most of their soldiers are blocked within barracks and have their water and electricity supplies cut off.
1991	1 July	Germany unilaterally recognizes Slovenia as an independent state.
1991	7 July	The Brioni Agreement between Slovenia and the SFR Yugoslavia is signed, under political patronage of the European Economic Community (EEC). The Ten-Day War ends and the Yugoslav People's Army is given three months to leave the territory of the Republic of Slovenia. In all, fewer than a hundred people died in the clashes, mostl of whom were Yugoslav People Army's soldiers and personnel.
1991	26 October	Last troops of the Yugoslav People's Army leave Slovenia.
1991	23 December	Independent Slovenia gets a new, democratic constitution.
1992	15 January	All members of the European Economic Community recognize Slovenia as a state.
1992	24 March	Slovenia becomes a member of the Organization for Security and Co-operation in Europe.
1992	7 April	The United States recognize Slovenia as a sovereign state.
1992	22 May	Slovenia becomes a member of the United Nations.
1992	6 December	The first presidential election in the independent Slovenia is held and Milan Kučan becomes the first president of Slovenia.
1993	14 May	Slovenia joins the Council of Europe.
1997	23 November	The second presidential election is held, with Milan Kučan securing his second mandate.
1998	1 January	Slovenia becomes a non-permanent member of the UN Security Council.

== 21st century ==
Year	Date	Event
2002	31 March	Most recent national census is conducted.
2002	6 October	The European Commission announces that Slovenia, together with nine other countries (Cyprus, the Czech Republic, Estonia, Hungary, Latvia, Lithuania, Malta, Poland, and Slovakia), has met the criteria to join the European Union, which would see its membership expand from 15 member states to 25.
2002	21 November	During the Prague (Czech Republic) NATO summit, Slovenia is invited to start talks in order to join the alliance, together with six other countries (Estonia, Latvia, Lithuania, Slovakia, Romania, and Bulgaria.
2002	1 December	Janez Drnovšek wins the third presidential election and becomes the second president of Slovenia.
2003	23 March	Referendums on joining the EU and NATO are held and both initiatives are successful.
2004	29 March	Slovenia, together with six former Warsaw Pact countries of Bulgaria, Estonia, Latvia, Lithuania, Romania and Slovakia, joins NATO.
2004	1 May	Slovenia enters the European Union along with Cyprus, the Czech Republic, Estonia, Hungary, Latvia, Lithuania, Malta, Poland and Slovakia. The Slovenian tolar becomes part of the European Exchange Rate Mechanism, in preparation for eventual adoption of the euro.
2005	1 January	Slovenia takes over the rotating presidency of the Organization for Security and Co-operation in Europe.
2006	25 September	Slovenia takes over the rotating presidency of the IAEA.
2007	1 January	Slovenia adopts the euro as its legal tender currency, and begins issuing its own euro coins.
2007	11 November	Danilo Türk wins the fourth presidential election and becomes the third president of Slovenia.
2007	21 December	Slovenia joins the Schengen Area.
2008	1 January	Slovenia takes over the rotating presidency of the European Union as the first among the new member states.
2009	18 July	Slovenia takes over the rotating presidency of the Council of Europe.
2010	21 July	Slovenia becomes a member of the OECD.
2012	2 December	Borut Pahor wins the fifth presidential election, and becomes the fourth President of Slovenia.
2017	12 November	Borut Pahor wins the sixth presidential election, and becomes the second president to win a second mandate.
2021	1 July	Slovenia takes over the rotating presidency of the European Union for the second time.
2022	13 November	Nataša Pirc Musar wins the seventh presidential election, and becomes the fifth President of Slovenia, and the first woman in this role.

== See also ==
- Timeline of Ljubljana

== Bibliography ==
- "Slovenia". Political Chronology of Europe. Europa Publications. 2003. pp. 234+. ISBN 978-1-135-35687-3.
- Leopoldina Plut-Pregelj; Carole Rogel (2007). "Chronology". A to Z of Slovenia (2nd ed.). Rowman & Littlefield. ISBN 978-0-8108-7216-5.
