= TMG =

TMG may refer to:

== Computing ==
- TMG (language)
- Microsoft Forefront Threat Management Gateway
- The Master Genealogist, software

== Science and technology ==
- Tensiomyography, for detecting muscle properties
- Tetramethylguanidine, a superbase
- Trimethylglycine, an amino acid derivative
- Trimethylgallium, Ga(CH3)3
- Touring motor glider
- Thermal Micrometeoroid Garment, the outer layer of a space suit
- Thermomechanical generator, the Harwell Stirling engine

== Music ==
- Ted Mulry Gang, an Australian rock group
- The Militia Group, a record label
- Tak Matsumoto Group, a Japanese supergroup
- Tiny Meat Gang, an American rap comedy duo
- The Mountain Goats, an American indie rock band

== Other media ==
- Tele München Gruppe, Munich, Germany
- Telegraaf Media Groep, Netherlands
- The Messina Group, a global strategic consulting firm founded in 2013 by Jim Messina
- Times Media Group, South Africa
- TMG Studios, an American podcast company and production studio

== Other uses ==
- Tunney Media Group, fictional owner of NBS on Studio 60 on the Sunset Strip
- Tennessee Meiji Gakuin High School
- Têxtil Manuel Gonçalves, a Portuguese company
- The Monitoring Group, a UK anti-racist charity
- Former NYSE symbol for TransMontaigne
- Trident Media Guard, a French anti-software-piracy company
- Tunisia Monitoring Group, a free-expression group
- Toyota Motorsport GmbH, Cologne, Germany
- The Motorsports Group, a US team
