= Ivo Kolin =

Animation of the Low Temperature Difference Stirling engine

Ivo Kolin (1924, Zagreb - 2007, Zagreb) was a Croatian economist, engineer and inventor.

After years of experimentation he demonstrated in 1983 the first Low Temperature Difference (LTD) Stirling engine which ran at the temperature difference as low as 15 °C, astonishingly low at the time. It was also the first time in history of piston motors heat was turned into a mechanical work at the temperature lower than the boiling water. The engine was later significantly improved by an American engineer James Senft building on his previous work with Ringbom Stirling engines. (Note: The Ringbom Stirling engine was patented in 1904 by the Finn Ossian Ringbom.) Senft created an ultra LTD Ringbom Stirling engine which ran at the temperature difference of just 0.5 °C. Such engines, which could even run from heat absorbed while resting on the palm of a human hand, offer many applications, such as Solar Powered Stirling Engines.
