= Slovenian passport =

Slovenian international identification document

Slovenian passport; Slovenski potni list
- The front cover of a contemporary Slovenian biometric passport (with chip)

- Identity page of the Slovenian passport
- Type: Passport
- Issued by: Slovenia
- First issued: 1 October 1991; 28 August 2006 (biometric passport); 12 December 2016 (current version)
- Purpose: Identification
- Eligibility: Slovenian citizenship
- Cost: €58.87 (10 years; age 18+); €52.07 (5 years; age 3-18); €47.97 (3 years; age under 3); €47.57 (1 year; when in 5 years two or more passports were lost or stolen or fingerprints cannot be taken)

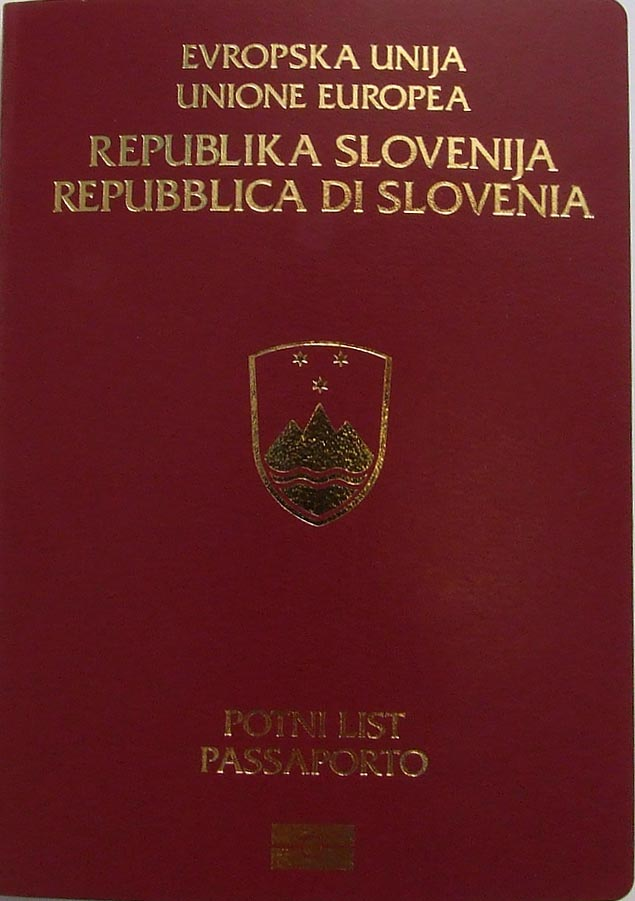
Bilingual Slovene-Italian version of the Slovenian Passport.

Slovenian passports (Slovene: slovenski potni list) are issued to citizens of the Republic of Slovenia to facilitate international travel. Every Slovenian citizen is also a citizen of the European Union; as such, the passport, along with Slovenian identity card, allows for free rights of movement and residence in any member state of the European Union and European Economic Area, as well as Switzerland, under Article 21 of the EU Treaty.

Slovenian passports are in booklet form pursuant to the recommended standards (i.e. size, composition, layout, technology) of the International Civil Aviation Organization (ICAO). They are issued by all 58 administrative units in the country, as well as by the Ministry of the Interior and Ministry of Foreign Affairs in certain circumstances. In addition to regular passports, Slovenia also issues special passports for diplomats and government officials, as well as emergency passports for Slovenian or EU citizens stranded abroad.

Pursuant to applicable bilateral or international agreements, the Slovenian ID card can substitute a passport for travel to certain countries, including most other former Yugoslav republics (Croatia, Bosnia and Herzegovina, North Macedonia, Montenegro and Serbia).

== Administration ==
The main authorities responsible for issuing of passports in Slovenia are administrative units of the national government, of which there are 58 nationwide. In emergency circumstances—such as urgent medical treatment, illness, the death of a close family member, or an urgent business matter—the passport may also be issued by the Ministry of the Interior.

Citizens residing abroad permanently or temporarily, or who are travelling abroad but unable to return to the country for medical or other compelling reasons, may be issued a passport by the Slovenian embassy, consular office, or designated authority within that jurisdiction. Diplomatic and official passports are issued by the Ministry of Foreign Affairs.

== Requirements ==
Slovenian passports are issuable only to citizens of the country.

Diplomatic passports are issued to government officials (and their close relatives), including but not limited to the President of the Republic of Slovenia, members of the National Assembly, and members of the European Parliament; employees of consular and diplomatic missions abroad who hold diplomatic or consular titles; employees of the Ministry of Foreign Affairs,; and "certain other persons, if it is in the interest of the Republic of Slovenia".

Official passports (also known as services passports) are issued to members of the National Council, employees of the Ministry of Foreign Affairs, and employees of diplomatic or consular missions who do not have a diplomatic passport, as well as to their close relatives.

As Slovenia has certain restrictions on dual nationality, individuals naturalizing to Slovenian citizenship are expected to renounce their former nationality—and by extension foreign passports issued thereunder—unless the Slovenian government grants a special exception based on strong justification.

== Physical appearance ==
Slovenian passports are the same burgundy colour as other European passports, with the Slovenian Coat of arms emblazoned in the centre of the front cover. The words evropska unija (English: European Union) and republika slovenija (English: Republic of Slovenia) are inscribed above the coat of arms and the word potni list (English: Passport) is inscribed below. Passports issued in officially bilingual areas of Slovenia also have Italian or Hungarian text below the Slovene. These are unione europea, repubblica di slovenia and passaporto in Italian and európai unió, szlovén köztársaság and útlevél in Hungarian. Slovenian passports have the standard biometric symbol at the bottom and use the standard EU design.

== Visa requirements ==
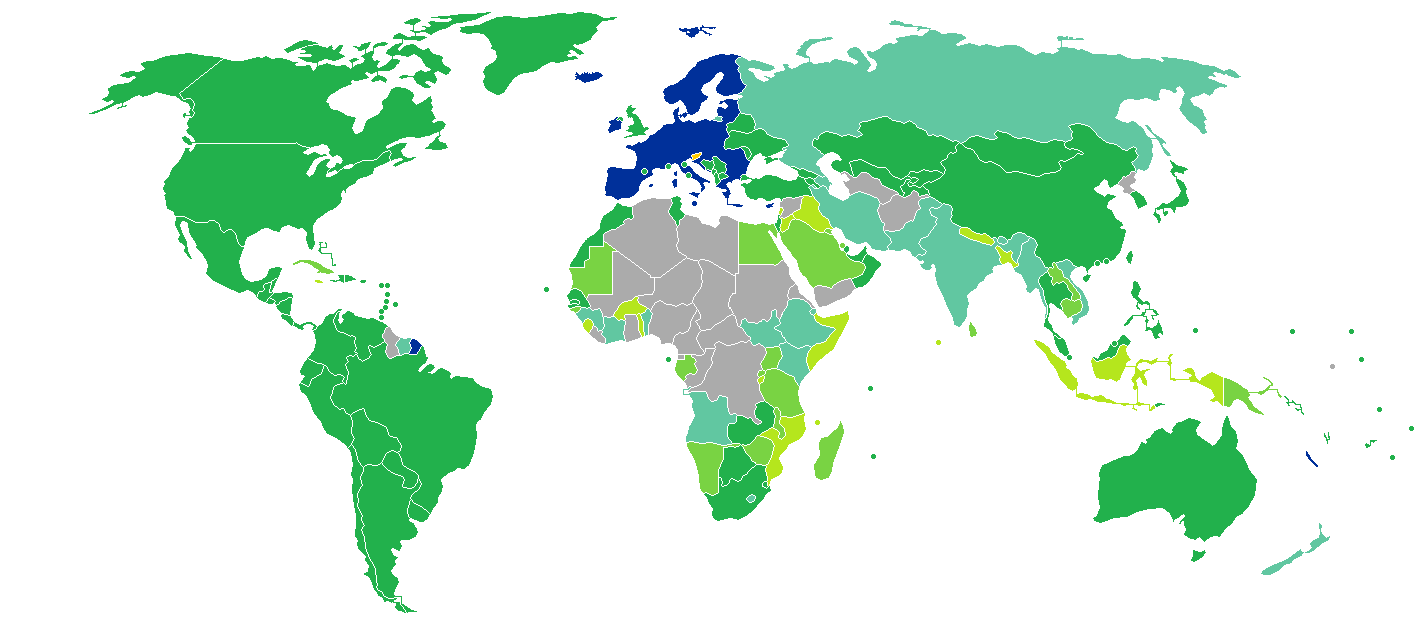
Countries and territories with visa-free entries or visas on arrival for holders of Slovenian passports Slovenia Freedom of movement Visa not required Visa on arrival eVisa Visa available both on arrival or online Visa required prior to arrival

The Slovenian passport generally ranks high in various metrics such as accessibility and mobility. Slovenian citizens had visa-free or visa-on-arrival access to 183 countries and territories, ranking the Slovenian passport ninth overall in terms of travel freedom (tied with the Croatian, Latvian, and Slovak passports) and the highest ranking of the former Yugoslavian states, according to the 2025 Henley Passport Index. Arton Capital's Passport Index ranked Slovenia's passport sixth in the world in terms of travel freedom, with a visa-free score of 116 (tied with Latvia and New Zealand), as of June 2025.

The Slovenian Passport ranked 13th in the Nomad Passport Index 2025, which evaluates passports based on five weighted criteria, including visa-free travel, taxation, and "global perception" (tied with Germany, Czechia, Belgium, and Denmark). Slovenia was among the countries that rose in the ranking relative to prior years, owing mostly to changes in tax policy.

== See also ==
Media related to Slovenian passport at Wikimedia Commons

- Passports of the European Union
- Visa requirements for Slovenian citizens
