= Healthcare in Slovenia =

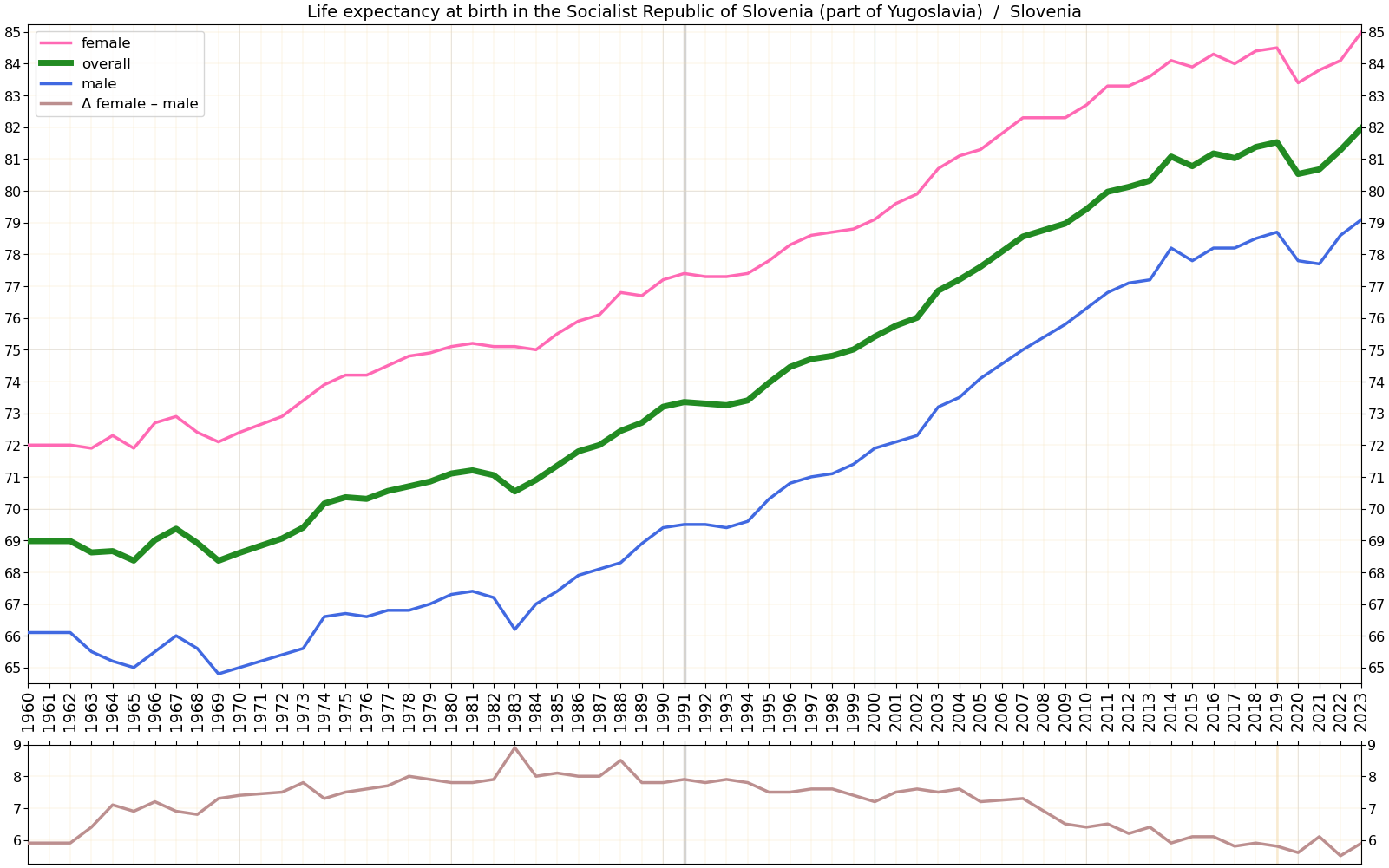
Life expectancy development in Slovenia by gender

Healthcare in Slovenia is organised primarily through the Health Insurance Institute of Slovenia. In 2015, healthcare expenditures accounted for 8.10% of GDP. The Slovenian healthcare system was ranked 15th in the Euro Health Consumer Index 2015. The country ranked second in the 2012 Euro Hepatitis Index.

The Slovenian healthcare system is a conservative-health care model financed through a mandatory insurance program called the Health Insurance Institute of Slovenia, HIIS (Slovene: Zavod za zdravstveno zavarovanje Slovenije) with contributions paid by both employers and employees. However, not all costs are borne by the mandatory insurance scheme (though children's healthcare is fully covered). Almost all Slovenes thus pay voluntary insurance fees for additional coverage that provides additional funds for the healthcare system. Healthcare expenditure is comparable to those of other advanced European nations. The National Health Insurance Institute oversees all healthcare services. Citizens (and registered long-term residents) have a right to equal healthcare access.

== Organisation ==
The National Health Insurance Institute is legally mandated to provide compulsory health insurance to all citizens. All newly hired employees must be registered with the NIIS by the employer. The combined contribution equates to 13.45%, 6.56% of which is paid by the employer, and 6.36% by the employee. The employer also pays an additional 0.53% for work-related injury and occupational disease insurance.

Dependent family members are covered by the employed family members. Self-employed people must contribute a fixed proportion of their after-tax income. The unemployed, elderly, long-term sickness patients or people on maternity leave pay a fixed amount of healthcare contributions with the amount dependent on their health status.

The state fund does fully cover most medical services (treatments, prescription drugs, hospitalization, etc.). The Mutual Health Insurance organization (Vzajemna zdravstvena zavarovalnica) was established in 1999 to provide voluntary complementary health insurance (co-pay coverage). It is owned and operated by the insured and operates as a non-profit and mutuality status. Other insurance companies are also able to offer complimentary insurance.

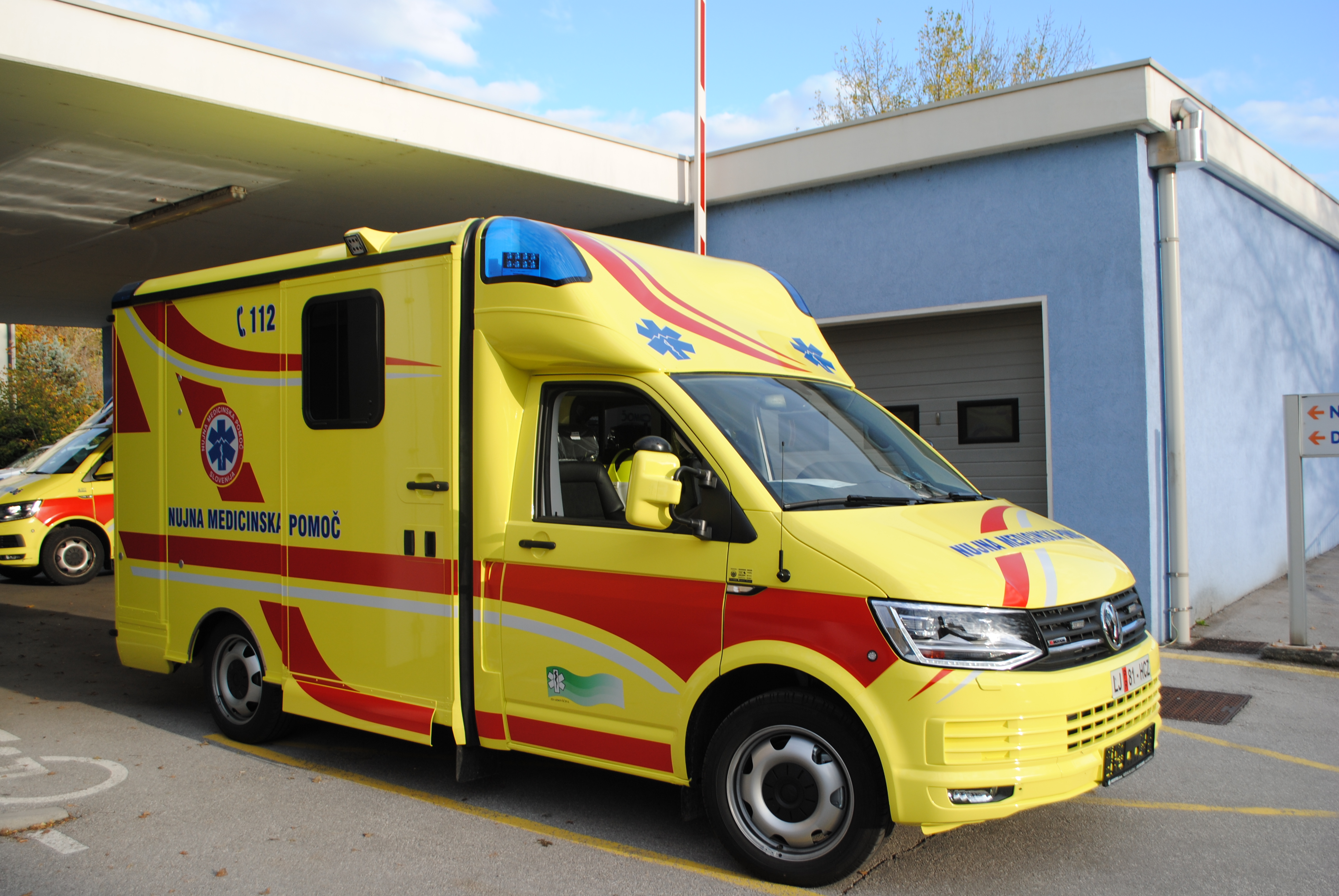
Ambulance of the Health Centre Ajdovščina

=== Emergency care ===
All emergency services are provided for free, including the cost of the ambulance. Emergency rooms are open all day, every day of the year. For people who are not Slovene citizens, emergency care may also be provided, usually free of charge. Once stabilized, the doctor or staff will ask for proof of insurance, or else the patient may have to pay a fee.

=== Dental care ===
Dental services may entail co-pays. All people up to the age of 19 are given free access to dental care without co-payments. With the exception of emergency cases, co-payments for adults are in the range of 10–60%, with co-payment rates for individual procedures fixed by the Health Care and Health Insurance Act of 1992.

=== Private practice ===
With the wave of rapid modernization in the early 1990s, the newly independent Republic of Slovenia attempted to resolve long-standing issues with the nation's healthcare system, culminating with the overhaul of the system with the passage of the Health Care and Health Insurance Act of 1992. The act included the reintroduction of private practices, among other provisions.

There is a higher level of satisfaction among those who were treated by a private practitioner than of those who went to a public physician (Toš et al. 2004).

From 1992 to 2009, there were 1,279 private practitioners in the country, out of a total of 8,191 physicians. Private practitioners may also be registered with the HIIS. Only 190 were not registered by the end of 2006. There seems to be a trend in people shifting towards private practitioners with the introduction of provision care in private practices. In fact, the highest proportion of all private practices comes from the dental field, where around 15% of all dentists are in private practice.

== Challenges ==
There are still issues facing the Slovene health system, particularly long waiting times. Especially problematic are waiting times for dental services, as well as some specialists.

Since 2006, physician unemployment has remained low; there is in fact a shortage of physicians, especially in parts of the country where access to healthcare is limited. Since the 1990s, there has been a steady increase in the number of physicians in Slovenia, mainly due to the fact that most medical schools increased their number of graduates, and increased migration other from parts of the former Yugoslavia to Slovenia.

There has been an upward trend in the number of dentists as well, however, the rate of increase is lower than for physicians.

=== Reform ===
Since the economic crisis of 2008, Slovenia was one of the many nations that experienced hardship. Like many other nations, the amount of health spending decreased in real terms in 2010. While health spending had increased since, the amount is less than 1% per year. However, the amount spent on healthcare expenditures has also been challenged. In 2012, Slovenia paid 9.3% of its GDP on healthcare and long-term care, the same as the OECD average. However, this was higher than the average amount of GDP spent for nations with comparable GDP per capita. There have also been complaints of higher costs for the voluntary insurance.

Like many other OECD nations, spending on pharmaceuticals has been decreasing, with Slovenia decreasing spending by less than 1% in 2011, but increasing 2.6% in 2012. In 2009, there were reforms to control the spending growth on pharmaceuticals. These reforms included lists of drugs that would be reimbursed by the national health insurance fund, as well as price reductions that were negotiated between both the government and pharmaceutical companies.

=== Digitalization ===
One of the ways Slovenia is trying to tackle the aforementioned issues of long waiting lines, staff shortage, and overworked employees is by the use of zVEM, an e-government platform dedicated to healthcare. zVEM not only helps with the problems the government and healthcare institutions are facing, but it also makes many processes easier by providing secure access to data and different e-health services to all users with Slovenian health insurance.

By implementing this app, the government of Slovenia created a system where personal medical records are easily accessible, as well as different medical prescriptions and medical referrals to specialists. Furthermore, the app enables the users to make an appointment without calling or waiting in lines. Via the portal, services like ePrescription, eOrdering, and Central Patient Data Register are made available after the initial sign-up process has been completed.

The platform was developed in 2015, but users were given access in 2017. Since its introduction, the number of users was steadily growing, amounting to over 409 900 registered users in 2021. The increase in the number of users in 2021 was due to restrictions imposed to slow down the spread of the COVID-19 pandemic by requiring residents to have a certificate as proof of vaccination or a COVID test. The app enabled easy access and easy check of COVID certificates by displaying the QR code.

This innovation in the healthcare system was a big step toward the digitalization of the healthcare system but further improvements are expected in the future. Signing up for zVEM requires a digital ID, which is issued by the government, and this process takes a lot of time. zVEM is available only for the people with Slovene health insurance and despite the different minorities present in Slovenia, there are only Slovene and English language versions. These issues need to be resolved to make the platform widely accessible.

== Hospitals ==
See List of hospitals in Slovenia
