= Visa requirements for Slovenian citizens =

Administrative entry restrictions

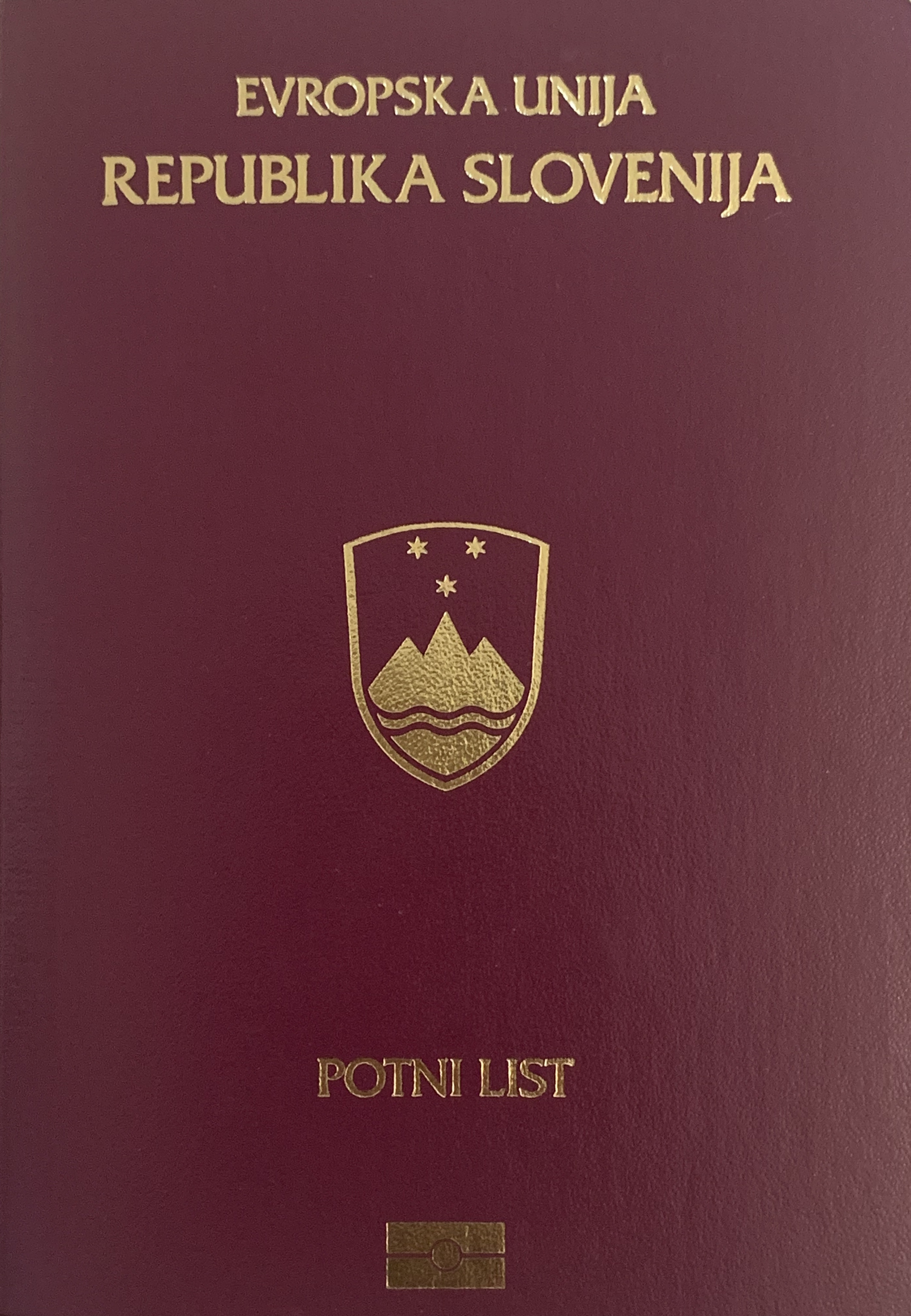
A Slovenian passport

Visa requirements for Slovenian citizens are administrative entry restrictions imposed on citizens of Slovenia by the authorities of other states.

As of 2026 Slovenian citizens had visa-free or visa on arrival access to 182 countries and territories, ranking the Slovenian passport 7th overall in terms of travel freedom (tied with passports from New Zealand, and Slovakia) according to the Henley Passport Index.

== Visa requirements map ==
Visa requirements for Slovenian citizens using normal passports Slovenia - Right of abode Freedom of movement Visa not required / ETA (Note: ETA required for Canada if arriving by air, Kenya, Israel, New Zealand, Saint Kitts and Nevis, Seychelles, Sri Lanka, United Kingdom and the United States and its territories) (Note: Including Australian eVisitor.) Visa on arrival eVisa Visa available both on arrival or online (Note: Including Indonesian e-VOA) Visa required prior to arrival

== Visa requirements ==
Country	Visa requirement	Allowed stay	Notes (excluding departure fees)
Afghanistan	eVisa	30 days	Visa is not required in case born in Afghanistan or can proof that one of their parents is a national of Afghanistan or born in Afghanistan.; e-Visa : Visitors must arrive at Kabul International (KBL).
Albania	Visa not required	90 days	ID card valid
Algeria	Visa required		
Andorra	Visa not required		ID card valid
Angola	Visa not required	30 days	International Certificate of Vaccination required
Antigua and Barbuda	Visa not required	6 months	
Argentina	Visa not required	90 days	
Armenia	Visa not required	180 days	
Australia	eVisitor	90 days	90 days on each visit in 12-month period if granted
Austria	Visa not required	Freedom of movement; ID card valid	
Azerbaijan	eVisa	30 days	
Bahamas	Visa not required	3 months	
Bahrain	eVisa / Visa on arrival	14 days	Visa is also obtainable online.
Bangladesh	Visa on arrival	30 days	
Barbados	Visa not required	90 days	
Belarus	Visa not required	30 days	Visa-free until 31 December 2024.
Belgium	Visa not required	Freedom of movement; ID card valid	
Belize	Visa not required		
Benin	eVisa	30 days / 8 days	Must have an international vaccination certificate.
Bhutan	eVisa	90 days	Must pay 100 USD per person per night for Sustainable Development Fee; 200 USD from 31 August 2027
Bolivia	Visa not required	90 days	
Bosnia and Herzegovina	Visa not required	90 days	90 days within any 6-month period; ID card valid
Botswana	Visa not required	90 days	
Brazil	Visa not required	90 days	90 days within any 180 day period
Brunei	Visa not required	90 days	
Bulgaria	Visa not required	Freedom of movement; ID card valid	
Burkina Faso	eVisa	1 month	
Burundi	eVisa / Visa on arrival	1 month	From December 2021, passengers of all countries that required visa, can now obtain visa on arrival at Bujumbura International Airport, and all land borders.
Cambodia	eVisa / Visa on arrival	30 days	
Cameroon	eVisa		
Canada	eTA / Visa not required	6 months	eTA required if arriving by air.
Cape Verde	Visa not required	30 days	Must register online at least five days prior to arrival.
Central African Republic	Visa required		
Chad	eVisa	90 days	
Chile	Visa not required	90 days	
China	Visa not required	30 days	Visa-free from October 15, 2024 to December 31, 2026.
Colombia	Visa not required	90 days	90 days - extendable up to 180-days stay within a one-year period
Comoros	Visa on arrival	45 days	
Republic of the Congo	Visa required		
Democratic Republic of the Congo	eVisa	7 days	
Costa Rica	Visa not required	90 days	
Côte d'Ivoire	eVisa	3 months	eVisa holders must arrive via Port Bouet Airport.
Croatia	Visa not required	Freedom of movement; ID card valid	
Cuba	eVisa	90 days	Can be extended up to 180 days
Cyprus	Visa not required	Freedom of movement; ID card valid	
Czech Republic	Visa not required	Freedom of movement; ID card valid	
Denmark	Visa not required	Freedom of movement (DK); ID card valid	
Djibouti	eVisa / Visa on arrival	31 days	
Dominica	Visa not required	90 days	90 days within any 180 day period
Dominican Republic	Visa not required	30 days	Can be extended up to 120 days with fee
Ecuador	Visa not required	90 days	
Egypt	eVisa / Visa on arrival	30 days	
El Salvador	Visa not required	180 days.	
Equatorial Guinea	eVisa		Must arrive via Malabo International Airport, processing fee 75 USD
Eritrea	Visa required		
Estonia	Visa not required	Freedom of movement; ID card valid	
Eswatini	Visa not required	30 days	
Ethiopia	eVisa / Visa on arrival	up to 90 days	Visa on arrival is obtainable only at Addis Ababa Bole International Airport.; e-Visa holders must arrive via Addis Ababa Bole International Airport.; e-Visa is available for 30 or 90 days.
Fiji	Visa not required	4 months	
Finland	Visa not required	Freedom of movement; ID card valid	
France	Visa not required	Freedom of movement (in Regions of France); ID card valid	
Gabon	eVisa	90 days	Electronic visa holders must arrive via Libreville International Airport.
Gambia	Visa not required	90 days	
Georgia	Visa not required	1 year	ID card valid
Germany	Visa not required	Freedom of movement; ID card valid	
Ghana	eVisa	90 days	
Greece	Visa not required	Freedom of movement; ID card valid	
Grenada	Visa not required	3 months	
Guatemala	Visa not required	90 days	
Guinea	eVisa	90 days	
Guinea-Bissau	Visa on arrival	90 days	
Guyana	eVisa		An eVisa(Approval letter) can only be obtained after contacting the Department of Immigration and Citizenship by phone. Payment is done upon arrival.
Haiti	Visa not required	90 days	
Honduras	Visa not required	90 days	
Hungary	Visa not required	Freedom of movement; ID card valid	
Iceland	Visa not required	Freedom of movement; ID card valid	
India	e-Visa	30 days	e-Visa holders must arrive via 32 designated airports (Note: Ahmedabad; Amritsar; Bagdogra; Bengaluru; Bhubaneswar; Chandigarh; Chennai; Coimbatore; Delhi; Gaya; Goa-Dabolim; Goa-Manohar; Guwahati; Hyderabad; Indore; Jaipur; Kannur; Kochi; Kolkata; Kozhikode; Lucknow; Madurai; Mangaluru; Mumbai; Nagpur; Port Blair; Pune; Surat; Thiruvananthapuram; Tiruchirappalli; Varanasi; Visakhapatnam) or 5 designated seaports. (Note: Chennai; Cochin; Mormugao (Goa); Mumbai; Mangalore); An Indian e-Tourist Visa may only be obtained twice within 1 calendar year.; Foreigners of Pakistani origin or who hold a Pakistani Passport are not eligible for an e-Visa. Foreigners who are not Pakistani nationals, but whose parents or grandparents (either paternal or maternal) were born in, or were permanent residents in Pakistan, are also not eligible for an e-Visa.
Indonesia	e-VOA / Visa on arrival	30 days	Not available at all entry points.
Iran	eVisa	30 days	
Iraq	eVisa	60 days	Visa on arrival or eVisa for up to 30 days for travel to Iraqi Kurdistan.
Ireland	Visa not required	Freedom of movement; ID card valid	
Israel	Electronic Travel Authorization	90 days	
Italy	Visa not required	Freedom of movement; ID card valid	
Jamaica	Visa not required	30 days	No visa required for 30 days or less as tourists with proof of vaccination against Measles, Rubella & Polio; Travellers proof of vaccination against Measles, Rubella & Polio can obtain a visa on arrival.; No visa required for holders of diplomatic passports
Japan	Visa not required	90 days	
Jordan	eVisa / Visa on arrival	30 days	Conditions apply
Kazakhstan	Visa not required	30 days	
Kenya	Electronic Travel Authorisation	90 days	
Kiribati	Visa not required	90 days	90 days within any 180 day period
North Korea	Visa required		
South Korea	Visa not required	90 days	
Kuwait	eVisa / Visa on arrival	3 months	
Kyrgyzstan	Visa not required	60 days	
Laos	eVisa / Visa on arrival	30 days	18 (Note: Savannakhet Airport; Lanetoui - Mengkang (China); Meuangmom - Wan Pong (Myanmar); Banvang - Ban Khok Phai (Thailand); Namngeun - Huay Kon (Thailand); Paksan - Bueng Kan (Thailand); Paktaphan - Pak Saeng (Thailand); Pangmon - Ban Huak (Thailand); Phoudou (Thailand); Dak ta ock - Nam Giang (Vietnam); La Lai (Vietnam); Namkan (Vietnam); Namphao - Cau Treo (Vietnam); Namsoy - Na Meo (Vietnam); Naphao - Cha Lo (Vietnam); Pahang - Long Sap (Vietnam); Panghok - Tây Trang (Vietnam); Phoukeua - Bo Y (Vietnam)) of the 33 border crossings are only open to regular visa holders.; e-Visa may be used to enter Laos through the Luang Prabang, Pakse and Vientiane international airports, 3 Thai-Lao Friendship Bridges (Note: Vientiane (Friendship Bridge 1); Savannakhet (Friendship Bridge 2); Bokeo (Friendship Bridge 4)), in Boten (road and railroad), and in Vientiane (at Khamsavath railway station).; Visa on arrival is available at the Luang Prabang, Pakse and Vientiane international airports, 4 Thai-Lao Friendship Bridges (Note: Vientiane (Friendship Bridge 1); Savannakhet (Friendship Bridge 2); Khammouane (Friendship Bridge 3); Bokeo (Friendship Bridge 4)) and 7 border crossings. (Note: Nongnokkheane - Trapeang Kriel (Cambodia); Boten - Bo han (China); Golden Triangle/Samliemkham (Thailand); Khamsavath railway station (Thailand); Namheuang - Ban Na Kraseng (Thailand); Vang tao - Chongmek (Thailand); Dansavan - Lao Bảo (Vietnam))
Latvia	Visa not required	Freedom of movement; ID card valid	
Lebanon	Visa on arrival	1 month	Extendable for 2 additional months; Granted free of charge at Beirut International Airport or any other port of entry if there is no Israeli visa or seal, holding a telephone number, an address in Lebanon, and a non refundable return or circle trip ticket.
Lesotho	Visa not required	14 days	
Liberia	eVisa	90 days	The Liberia Visa on Arrival (VoA) allows travelers to obtain a Visa upon arrival in Liberia by plane. Travelers must pre-apply for the visa online.
Libya	eVisa	30 days	Independent travel is not permitted, and visitors must organize their visit through a tour guide. A tourist police escort is required at all times.; An eVisa will not be granted without a sponsor or tour agency.; A security letter issued by the Libyan Immigration Authorities may also be required.; Holders of passports containing an Israeli stamp or visa will be refused entry in Libya.
Liechtenstein	Visa not required	Freedom of movement; ID card valid	
Lithuania	Visa not required	Freedom of movement; ID card valid	
Luxembourg	Visa not required	Freedom of movement; ID card valid	
Madagascar	eVisa / Visa on arrival	90 days	
Malawi	eVisa / Visa on arrival	90 days	
Malaysia	Visa not required	90 days	
Maldives	Visa on arrival	30 days	
Mali	Visa required		
Malta	Visa not required	Freedom of movement; ID card valid	
Marshall Islands	Visa not required	90 days	90 days within any 180 day period
Mauritania	eVisa		Visa on arrival is not available anymore since the introduction of the eVisa.
Mauritius	Visa not required	180 days	180 days per calendar year for tourism, 120 days per calendar year for business
Mexico	Visa not required	180 days	
Micronesia	Visa not required	90 days	90 days within any 180 day period
Moldova	Visa not required	90 days	90 days within any 180 day period
Monaco	Visa not required		ID card valid
Mongolia	Visa not required	30 days	
Montenegro	Visa not required	90 days	ID card valid for 30 days
Morocco	Visa not required	90 days	
Mozambique	eVisa/Visa on arrival	30 days	
Myanmar	eVisa	28 days	eVisa holders must arrive via Yangon, Nay Pyi Taw or Mandalay airports or via land border crossings with Thailand — Tachileik, Myawaddy and Kawthaung or India — Rih Khaw Dar and Tamu.; eVisa available for both tourism (allowed stay is 28 days) or business (allowed stay is 70 days) purposes.
Namibia	eVisa / Visa on arrival	3 months	Can be obtained online or on arrival for a fee of N$1,600 (approximately €82 / US$88).
Nauru	Visa required		
Nepal	Visa on arrival / eVisa	90 days	
Netherlands	Visa not required	Freedom of movement (European Netherlands); ID card valid	
New Zealand	Electronic Travel Authority	3 months	Slovenian collective passports are unacceptable, and visas will not be endorsed in them.; International Visitor Conservation and Tourism Levy must be paid upon requesting an Electronic Travel Authority.; Holders of an Australian Permanent Resident Visa or Resident Return Visa may be granted a New Zealand Resident Visa on arrival permitting indefinite stay (pursuant to the Trans-Tasman Travel Arrangement), subject to meeting character requirements and obtaining an Electronic Travel Authority prior to departure. Such travellers are not required to pay the International Visitor Conservation and Tourism Levy.
Nicaragua	Visa not required	90 days	
Niger	Visa required		
Nigeria	eVisa	90 days	Holders of written e-Visa approval issued by the Immigration Authority can obtain a visa on arrival, provided they hold a visa application form and e-Visa application payment receipt and have an invitation letter from a Nigerian company accepting immigration responsibilities.
North Macedonia	Visa not required	90 days	ID card valid
Norway	Visa not required	Freedom of movement; ID card valid	
Oman	Visa not required	14 days	30 days eVisa also available.
Pakistan	eVisa	90 days	Free of charge
Palau	Visa not required	90 days	90 days within any 180 day period
Panama	Visa not required	90 days	
Papua New Guinea	Easy Visitor Permit	60 days	
Paraguay	Visa not required	90 days	
Peru	Visa not required	90 days	90 days within any 6-month period
Philippines	Visa not required	30 days	
Poland	Visa not required	Freedom of movement; ID card valid	
Portugal	Visa not required	Freedom of movement; ID card valid	
Qatar	Visa not required	90 days	
Romania	Visa not required	Freedom of movement; ID card valid	
Russia	eVisa	30 days	e-Visa (30 calendar days) holders must arrive and depart through approved border crossings
Rwanda	eVisa / Visa on arrival	30 days	
Saint Kitts and Nevis	Electronic Travel Authorisation	3 months	
Saint Lucia	Visa not required	90 days	90 days within any 180 day period
Saint Vincent and the Grenadines	Visa not required	6 months	
Samoa	Visa not required	90 days	90 days within any 180 day period
San Marino	Visa not required		ID card valid
São Tomé and Príncipe	Visa not required	15 days	
Saudi Arabia	eVisa / Visa on arrival	90 days	
Senegal	Visa not required	90 days	
Serbia	Visa not required	90 days	ID card valid
Seychelles	Visa not required	3 months	
Sierra Leone	eVisa / Visa on arrival	30 days	
Singapore	Visa not required	90 days	
Slovakia	Visa not required	Freedom of movement; ID card valid	
Solomon Islands	Visa not required	90 days	90 days within any 180 day period
Somalia	eVisa		Available at Berbera, Borama, Burao, Erigavo and Hargeisa airports.; 30 days, available at Bosaso Airport, Galcaio Airport and Mogadishu Airport.
South Africa	Visa not required	90 days	
South Sudan	eVisa		Obtainable online; Printed visa authorization must be presented at the time of travel
Spain	Visa not required	Freedom of movement; ID card valid	
Sri Lanka	Electronic Travel Authorisation	30 days	Sri Lanka introduced an ETA valid for 30 days.
Sudan	Visa required		
Suriname	Visa not required	90 days	An entrance fee of US$25 or 25 Euros must be paid online prior to arrival.; Multiple entry eVisa is also available.
Sweden	Visa not required	Freedom of movement; ID card valid	
Switzerland	Visa not required	Freedom of movement; ID card valid	
Syria	eVisa		
Tajikistan	Visa not required	30 days	60 days eVisa also available.; Visiting GBAO requires a permit that can be requested alongside the eVisa.
Tanzania	eVisa / Visa on arrival	3 months	
Thailand	Visa not required	60 days	
Timor-Leste	Visa not required	90 days	90 days within any 180 day period
Togo	eVisa	15 days	
Tonga	Visa not required	90 days	90 days within any 180 day period
Trinidad and Tobago	Visa not required	90 days	90 days within any 180 day period
Tunisia	Visa not required	3 months	
Turkey	Visa not required	90 days	
Turkmenistan	Visa required		
Tuvalu	Visa not required	90 days	90 days within any 180 day period
Uganda	eVisa		May apply online.
Ukraine	Visa not required	90 days	90 days within any 180 day period
United Arab Emirates	Visa not required	90 days	90 days within any 180 day period
United Kingdom	Electronic Travel Authorisation	6 months	ETA required, valid for 2 years when issued.
United States	Visa Waiver Program	90 days	ESTA required, valid for 2 years when issued.
Uruguay	Visa not required	90 days	
Uzbekistan	Visa not required	30 days	
Vanuatu	Visa not required	90 days	90 days within any 180 day period
Vatican City	Visa not required		ID card valid
Venezuela	Visa not required	90 days	
Vietnam	Visa not required	45 days	Phú Quốc without a visa for up to 30 days.
Yemen	Visa required		
Zambia	Visa not required	90 days	Also eligible for a universal visa allowing access to Zimbabwe.
Zimbabwe	eVisa / Visa on arrival	30 days	Also eligible for a universal visa allowing access to Zambia.

== Territories and disputed areas ==
Visa requirements for Slovenian citizens for visits to various territories, disputed areas and restricted zones:

Europe

- Abkhazia — Visa required.
- Mount Athos — Special permit required (4 days: 25 euro for Orthodox visitors, 35 euro for non-Orthodox visitors, 18 euro for students). There is a visitors' quota: maximum 100 Orthodox and 10 non-Orthodox per day and women are not allowed.
- (Belarus) Brest and Grodno — Visa not required for 10 days.
- (Autonomous Republic of Crimea) Crimea — Visa issued by Russia is required.
- Turkish Republic of Northern Cyprus — Visa free access for 3 months. Passport required.
- (United Nations) UN Buffer Zone in Cyprus — Access Permit is required for travelling inside the zone, except Civil Use Areas.
- Gibraltar — Visa not required.
- (Norway) Jan Mayen — permit issued by the local police required for staying for less than 24 hours and permit issued by the Norwegian police for staying for more than 24 hours.
- Kosovo — visa free for 90 days.
- South Ossetia — Visa free. Multiple entry visa to Russia and three-day prior notification are required to enter South Ossetia.
- Transnistria — Visa free. Registration required after 24h.

Africa

- British Indian Ocean Territory — special permit required.
- Eritrea (outside Asmara) — visa covers Asmara only; to travel in the rest of the country, a Travel Permit for Foreigners is required (20 Eritrean nakfa).
- Saint Helena, Ascension and Tristan da Cunha
  - Ascension Island — eVisa for 3 months within any year period.
  - Saint Helena — Visitor's Pass granted on arrival valid for 4/10/21/60/90 days for 12/14/16/20/25 pound sterling.
  - Tristan da Cunha — Permission to land required for 15/30 pounds sterling (yacht/ship passenger) for Tristan da Cunha Island or 20 pounds sterling for Gough Island, Inaccessible Island or Nightingale Islands.
- Sahrawi Arab Democratic Republic (Western Sahara controlled territory) — undefined visa regime.
- Somaliland — visa required (30 days for 30 US dollars, payable on arrival).

Asia

- Hong Kong — Visa not required for 90 days.
- India — Protected Area Permit (PAP) required for all of Arunachal Pradesh, Manipur, Mizoram and parts of Himachal Pradesh, Jammu and Kashmir and Uttarakhand. Restricted Area Permit (RAP) required for all of Andaman and Nicobar Islands and Lakshadweep and parts of Sikkim. Some of these requirements are occasionally lifted for a year.
- Macao — Visa not required for 90 days.
- North Korea outside Pyongyang – People are not allowed to leave the capital city, tourists can only leave the capital with a governmental tourist guide (no independent moving)
- Palestine — Visa not required. Arrival by sea to Gaza Strip not allowed.
- Taiwan — Visa not required for 90 days.
- (Tajikistan) Gorno-Badakhshan Autonomous Province — OIVR permit required (15+5 Tajikistani Somoni) and another special permit (free of charge) is required for Lake Sarez.
- (China) Tibet Autonomous Region — Tibet Travel Permit required (10 US Dollars).
- (United Nations) Korean Demilitarized Zone — restricted zone.
- (United Nations) UNDOF Zone and Ghajar — restricted zones.

Caribbean and North Atlantic

- Anguilla — Visa not required for 3 months.
- Aruba — Visa not required for 30 days.
- Bermuda — Visa not required.
- (Netherlands) Bonaire, St. Eustatius and Saba — Visa not required for 3 months.
- British Virgin Islands — Visa not required.
- Cayman Islands — Visa not required for 6 months.
- Curacao — Visa not required for 3 months.
- Montserrat — Visa not required for 6 months.
- Puerto Rico — Visa not required under the Visa Waiver Program, for 90 days on arrival from overseas for 2 years. ESTA required.
- Sint Maarten — Visa not required for 3 months.
- Turks and Caicos Islands — Visa not required for 90 days.
- U.S. Virgin Islands — Visa not required under the Visa Waiver Program, for 90 days on arrival from overseas for 2 years. ESTA required.

Oceania

- American Samoa — Electronic authorization for 30 days.
- (Australia) Ashmore and Cartier Islands — special authorisation required.
- (France) Clipperton Island — special permit required.
- Cook Islands — Visa free access for 31 days.
- Guam — Visa not required under the Visa Waiver Program, for 90 days on arrival from overseas for 2 years. ESTA required.
- Niue — Visa on arrival valid for 30 days is issued free of charge.
- Pitcairn Islands — 14 days visa free and landing fee US$35 or tax of US$5 if not going ashore.
- Tokelau — Entry permit required.
- United States Minor Outlying Islands — special permits required for Baker Island, Howland Island, Jarvis Island, Johnston Atoll, Kingman Reef, Midway Atoll, Palmyra Atoll and Wake Island.

South Atlantic and Antarctica

- Falkland Islands — Visitor Permit valid for 4 weeks is issued on arrival.
- South Georgia and the South Sandwich Islands — Pre-arrival permit from the Commissioner required (72 hours/1 month for 110/160 pounds sterling).
- Antarctica and adjacent islands — special permits required for British Antarctic Territory, French Southern and Antarctic Lands, Argentine Antarctica, (Australia) Australian Antarctic Territory, (Antártica Chilena Province) Chilean Antarctic Territory, (Australia) Heard Island and McDonald Islands, (Norway) Peter I Island, (Norway) Queen Maud Land, (New Zealand) Ross Dependency.

== Non-ordinary passports ==
Holders of various categories of official Slovenian passports have additional visa-free access to the following countries - Azerbaijan (diplomatic passports), Cuba (diplomatic or service passports), Egypt (diplomatic, official, service or special passports), Indonesia (diplomatic or service passports), Kazakhstan (diplomatic passports), Libya (diplomatic, official or service passports), Russia (diplomatic passports) and Vietnam (diplomatic or service passports). Holders of diplomatic or service passports of any country have visa-free access to Cape Verde, Ethiopia, Mali and Zimbabwe.

== Non-visa restrictions ==
=== Blank passport pages ===
Many countries require a minimum number of blank pages to be available in the passport being presented, typically one or two pages. Endorsement pages, which often appear after the visa pages, are not counted as being valid or available.

=== Vaccination ===
Cover of the new International Certificate of Vaccination issued by the Bureau of Quarantine in the Philippines since 2021

The African countries of Angola, Benin, Burkina Faso, Burundi, Cameroon, Central African Republic, Democratic Republic of the Congo, Republic of the Congo, Côte d'Ivoire, Gabon, Ghana, Guinea-Bissau, Mali, Niger, Sierra Leone and Togo, South Sudan and Uganda, along with French Guiana in South America, require all incoming passengers older than nine months to one year, to have a current International Certificate of Vaccination or Prophylaxis.

Some other countries require vaccination only if the passenger is coming from an infected area or has visited one recently or has transited for 12 hours in those countries: Algeria, Botswana, Cabo Verde, Chad, Djibouti, Egypt, Eswatini, Ethiopia, Gambia, Ghana, Guinea, Lesotho, Libya, Equatorial Guinea, Eritrea, Madagascar, Malawi, Mauritania, Mauritius, Mozambique, Namibia, Nigeria, Papua New Guinea, Seychelles, Somalia, South Africa, Sudan, Tunisia, Uganda, Tanzania, Zambia and Zimbabwe.

=== Passport validity length ===
Very few countries, such as Paraguay, just require a valid passport on arrival.

However many countries and groupings now require only an identity card – especially from their neighbours. Other countries may have special bilateral arrangements that depart from the generality of their passport validity length policies to shorten the period of passport validity required for each other's citizens or even accept passports that have already expired (but not been cancelled).

Some countries, such as Japan, Ireland and the United Kingdom, require a passport valid throughout the period of the intended stay.

In the absence of specific bilateral agreements, countries requiring passports to be valid for at least 6 more months on arrival include Afghanistan, Algeria, Anguilla, Bahrain, Bhutan, Botswana, British Virgin Islands, Brunei, Cambodia, Cameroon, Cape Verde, Cayman Islands, Central African Republic, Chad, Comoros, Costa Rica, Côte d'Ivoire, Curaçao, Ecuador, Egypt, El Salvador, Equatorial Guinea, Fiji, Gabon, Guinea Bissau, Guyana, Haiti, India, Indonesia, Iran, Iraq, Israel, Jordan, Kenya, Kiribati, Kuwait, Laos, Madagascar, Malaysia, Marshall Islands, Mongolia, Myanmar, Namibia, Nepal, Nicaragua, Nigeria, Oman, Palau, Papua New Guinea, Peru, Philippines, Qatar, Rwanda, Samoa, Saudi Arabia, Singapore, Solomon Islands, Somalia, Sri Lanka, Sudan, Suriname, Tanzania, Thailand, Timor-Leste, Tokelau, Tonga, Turkey, Tuvalu, Uganda, United Arab Emirates, Vanuatu, Venezuela, and Vietnam.

Countries requiring passports valid for at least 4 months on arrival include Micronesia and Zambia.

Countries requiring passports with a validity of at least 3 months beyond the date of intended departure include Azerbaijan, Bosnia and Herzegovina, Honduras, Montenegro, Nauru, Moldova and New Zealand. Similarly, the EEA countries of Iceland, Liechtenstein, Norway, all European Union countries (except Ireland) together with Switzerland also require 3 months validity beyond the date of the bearer's intended departure unless the bearer is an EEA or Swiss national.

Countries requiring passports valid for at least 3 months on arrival include Albania, North Macedonia, Panama, and Senegal.

Bermuda requires passports to be valid for at least 45 days upon entry.

Countries that require a passport validity of at least one month beyond the date of intended departure include Eritrea, Hong Kong, Lebanon, Macau, the Maldives and South Africa.

==== Maximum passport age ====
Countries of the Schengen area require non-EU passports to be less than 10 years old upon entry.

=== Criminal record ===
Some countries, including Australia, Canada, Fiji, New Zealand and the United States, routinely deny entry to non-citizens who have a criminal record, while others impose restrictions depending on the type of conviction and the length of the sentence.

=== Persona non grata ===
The government of a country can declare a diplomat persona non grata, banning them from entering the country or expelling them if they have already entered. In non-diplomatic use, the authorities of a country may also declare a foreigner persona non grata permanently or temporarily, usually because of unlawful activity.

=== Israeli stamps ===
Kuwait, Lebanon, Libya, and Yemen do not allow entry to people with passport stamps from Israel or whose passports have either a used or an unused Israeli visa, or where there is evidence of previous travel to Israel such as entry or exit stamps from neighbouring border posts in transit countries such as Jordan and Egypt.

To circumvent this Arab League boycott of Israel, the Israeli immigration services have now mostly ceased to stamp foreign nationals' passports on either entry to or exit from Israel (unless the entry is for some work-related purposes). Since 15 January 2013, Israel no longer stamps foreign passports at Ben Gurion Airport. Passports are still (as of 22 June 2017) stamped at Erez when passing into and out of Gaza.

Iran refuses admission to holders of passports containing an Israeli visa or stamp that is less than 12 months old.

=== Biometrics ===
Several countries mandate that all travellers, or all foreign travellers, be fingerprinted on arrival and will refuse admission to or even arrest travellers who refuse to comply. In some countries, such as the United States, this may apply even to transit passengers who merely wish to change planes rather than go landside.

Fingerprinting countries/regions include Afghanistan, Argentina, Brunei, Cambodia, China, Ethiopia, Ghana, Guinea, India, Japan, Kenya (both fingerprints and a photo are taken), Malaysia upon entry and departure, Mongolia, Saudi Arabia, the Schengen Area, Singapore, South Korea, Taiwan, Thailand, Uganda, the United Arab Emirates and the United States.

Many countries also require a photo be taken of people entering the country. The United States, which does not fully implement exit control formalities at its land frontiers (although long mandated by its own legislation), intends to implement facial recognition for passengers departing from international airports to identify people who overstay their visa.

Together with fingerprint and face recognition, iris scanning is one of three biometric identification technologies internationally standardised since 2006 by the International Civil Aviation Organization (ICAO) for use in e-passports and the United Arab Emirates conducts iris scanning on visitors who need to apply for a visa. The United States Department of Homeland Security has announced plans to greatly increase the biometric data it collects at US borders. In 2018, Singapore began trials of iris scanning at three land and maritime immigration checkpoints.

== Right to consular protection in non-EU countries ==
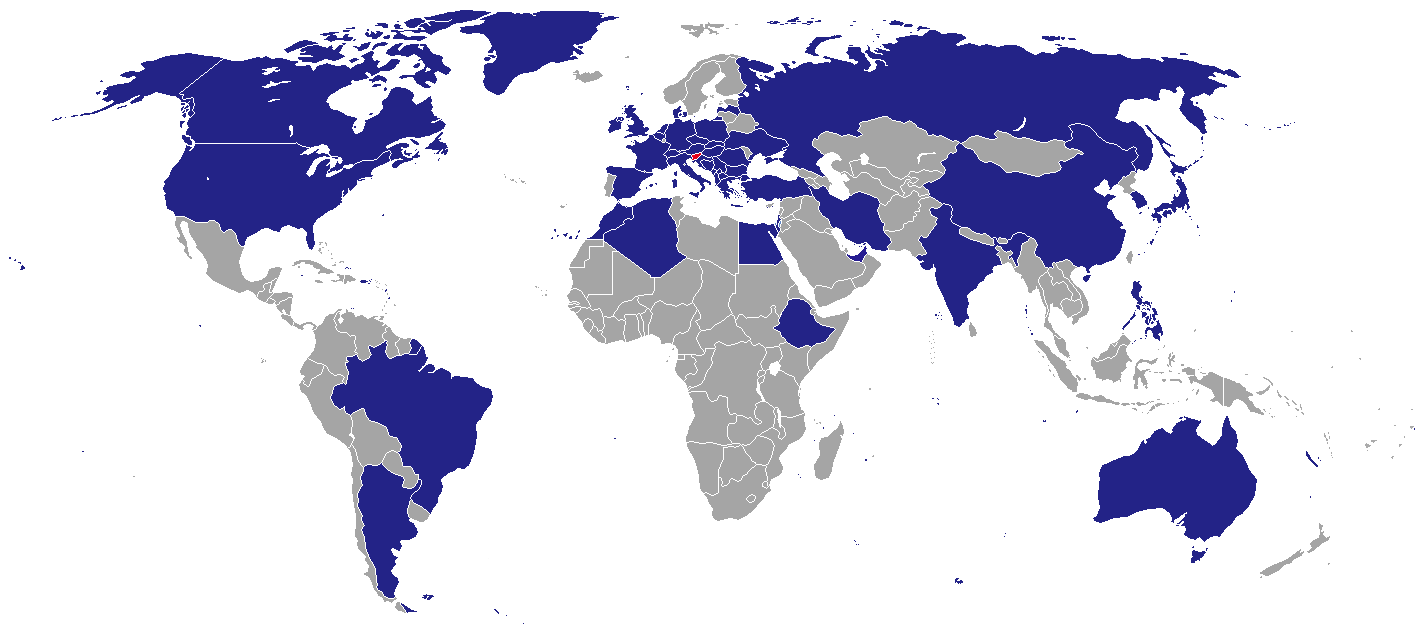
Countries with Slovenian diplomatic missions

When in a non-EU country where there is no Slovenian embassy, Slovenian citizens as EU citizens have the right to get consular protection from the embassy of any other EU country present in that country.

See also List of diplomatic missions of Slovenia.

== See also ==
- Visa requirements for European Union citizens
- Slovenian passport
- Visa policy of the Schengen Area
