= Magdalena District =

Magdalena District is a place name that may refer to:

- Magdalena District, Chachapoyas, a district of the province of Chachapoyas in Peru
- Magdalena District, Maribor, a district of the city of Maribor, northeastern Slovenia
