= Maribor University Medical Centre =

Geography
- Location: Ljubljanska ulica 5, 2000 Maribor, Slovenia
- Coordinates: 46.552908°N 15.648559°E

Organisation
- Type: General
- Affiliated university: University of Maribor

Services
- Emergency department: Yes
- Beds: 1,266

Helipads
- Helipad: No (Planned)

History
- Founded: 14 April 2007; 19 years ago

Links
- Website: www.ukc-mb.si/en/
- Lists: Hospitals in Slovenia

Maribor University Medical Centre (Slovene: Univerzitetni klinični center Maribor or UKC Maribor) is one of the largest medical institutions in Slovenia. It is located in Maribor, in the Magdalena District, on the right bank of Drava river.

== Organization ==
It employs more than 2,800 people, making it largest the employer in Maribor. The hospital has a capacity of 1,266 beds in multiple wards, in which more than 60,000 people are annually. An additional 390,000 people are treated in its clinics every year.

== See also ==
- List of hospitals in Slovenia
