= Tensiomyography =

Measuring method for detection of skeletal muscles' contractile properties

Tensiomyography (TMG) is a measuring method for detection of skeletal muscles' contractile properties. Tensiomyography assesses muscle mechanical response based on radial muscle belly displacement induced by a single electrical stimulus. It is performed using the TMG S2 system. A tensiomyography measurement instrument includes an electrical stimulator and data acquisition subunit (1), a digital sensor (2), a tripod with manipulating hand (3), and muscle electrodes (4) that work with an essential software interface installed on a PC.

Tensiomyography measurement unit

== Method ==
Tensiomyography is a non-invasive, evidence-based measurement method that precisely measures the speed of muscle contraction under isometric conditions. It is used in sports performance and rehabilitation, and in sports medicine and research, for instance. Tensiomyography data can be used to determine muscle fiber type (e.g., by comparing displacement signal and muscle histochemistry/ heavy chain myosin amount20) and muscle status/condition (e.g., fatigue, potentiation, inhibition, stress influence on the body, etc.), to diagnose functional muscular symmetry, either temporal or morphological, to evaluate muscular synchronization, and for fast detection (less than 5 minutes) of infra-clinical lesions in the muscles.

== Procedure ==
Tensiomyography measurement

A tensiomyography measurement consists of four steps:

1. A special sensor is placed on the muscle to be measured. The sensor contains a tip designed to register muscle's contraction.
2. Muscle contraction is induced with twitch type (one millisecond) of surface electrical stimulus.
3. Contraction of muscle under isometric conditions results in a muscle belly displacement.
4. A tensiomyography sensor is connected to a computer running specially designed software that records displacement of sensor tip during the test and shows results on software interface in real time.

== Tensiomyography recording ==
Tensiomyography specific software on a 1 kHz frequency receives tensiomyography signals. Two supra-maximal responses are stored and then the average is calculated. The supra-maximal stimulation is regarded as corresponding to a minimal stimulation and it determines maximum amplitude of muscular deformation, recorded as Dm.

Contraction time of muscle belly response to twitch stimulation for ED (fast muscle) and GCM (slow muscle) measured by tensiomyography. Contraction time is greater in slow muscles than in fast muscles

TMG method output is a displacement-time signal evaluated with standard parameters.

=== Parameters ===
- Delay time (Td) as a time between the electrical impulse and 10% of the contraction;
- Contraction time (Tc) as a time between 10% and 90% of the contraction;
- Sustain time (Ts) as a time between 50% of the contraction and 50% of the relaxation;
- Relaxation time (Tr) as a time between 90% and 50% of the relaxation;
- Maximal Displacement (Dm) Maximal displacement of the muscle contraction.

Some recent studies have also elected to examine Contraction velocity (Vc) as a change in Dm over time between 10% and 90% of the contraction.

== Tensiomyography use ==
Tensiomyography is a simple to use selective and non-invasive method for detecting skeletal muscle contractile parameters using the linear displacement sensor. It assesses skeletal muscle thickening and low frequency lateral oscillations of active skeletal muscle fibers during twitch contractions. Future directions should be multidimensional: further validation especially with muscle force; increasing the research power of established theories; determining the trends of physiological processes and adaptations through longitudinal designs; characterizing muscle fatigue, and developing its application in dynamic muscle contractions. Tensiomyography was originally designed to be used by medical professionals but has transitioned from medicine, through sports medicine and is now being utilized in sports training programs and post injury rehabilitation quantification. Because of its non-invasive nature, tensiomyography provides rapid accurate diagnostic data without discomfort or disruption of the routine of the person whose muscles are being assessed.

Tensiomyography was originally designed for optimization of rehabilitation processes in medicine. Moving on, tensiomyography is used in military, veterinary and most widely spread in the field of elite sports, especially where explosiveness is needed.

=== Sports Performance ===
Tensiomyography can be applied in training optimization process to prevent negative effects of muscle asymmetry and asynchrony on athletes’ maximal speed, explosiveness, endurance and flexibility. Application of tensiomyography method identifies muscle pair asymmetry and asynchronous action in the kinetic chain, which decreases movement economy and increase injury risk. Tensiomyographic assessment identifies muscle dysfunctions to adjust training accordingly (activate, strengthen or release tension in specific muscles). The contractile characteristics of athletes' muscles from specific sports disciplines have been defined using tensiomyography, despite the fact that very few sports have been thoroughly researched.

=== Sports Medicine ===
After an injury, tensiomyography can be used to determine injured muscle’s functional capacity by measuring individual muscle heads in isolation, providing unique and selective information. Data comparison with the uninjured contralateral muscle helps monitor early phase recovery. Measurement results help determine recovery of functional capacity so the most effective rehabilitation can be safely administered. During rehabilitation athletes can be assessed with tensiomyography for progress and rehabilitation strategy can be adjusted for faster rehabilitation.

=== Research ===
Since its first scientific publication in 1990 more than 300 articles show tensiomyography use and purpose: in the estimation of muscle composition; for evaluating muscle atrophy; for measuring adaptation to different pathologies; for measuring adaptation to specific training; and for measuring muscle fatigue.

Tensiomyography has been used in several research areas including acute muscle diagnostics, chronic muscle change diagnostics, local muscle fatigue and non-invasive determination of muscle fiber type composition.

==== International Society of Tensiomyography (ISOT) ====
ISOT strives to support further development in the field of tensiomyography and standardize tensiomyographic methods while connecting tensiomyography users worldwide for know-how exchange and networking. ISOT was formed at a congress held in Rome on 24 October 2014.

== History ==
The tensiomyography method was developed by a group of experts from various fields at the Faculty for Electrical Engineering at the University of Ljubljana. The Rehabilitation Institute in Ljubljana, Valdoltra Orthopedic Hospital and Slovenian Olympic Committee were among several other institutions that cooperated and were the method's early users and implementers.

The inventor of the method, Vojko Valenčič, was a leading researcher and head of Laboratory for Biomedical Imaging and Muscle Biomechanics. He had a close working relationship with the Department of Electronics at the University of Ljubljana, which provided human and technical resources and was aided in his work by three research assistants. The tensiomyography method was invented in the late 1980s and has since been improved through many prototypes and developed to the stage where clinical application of the method was possible. Although tensiomyography was initially intended for medical use, the method was also introduced into sports medicine and athletic training in 1996. In recent years, the development and application of the method has shifted more towards sports in cooperation with Srdjan Djordjevič, a biologist, applied physiologist and the founder of the company TMG-BMC Ltd.
