= Slovenian identity card =

National identity card of Slovenia

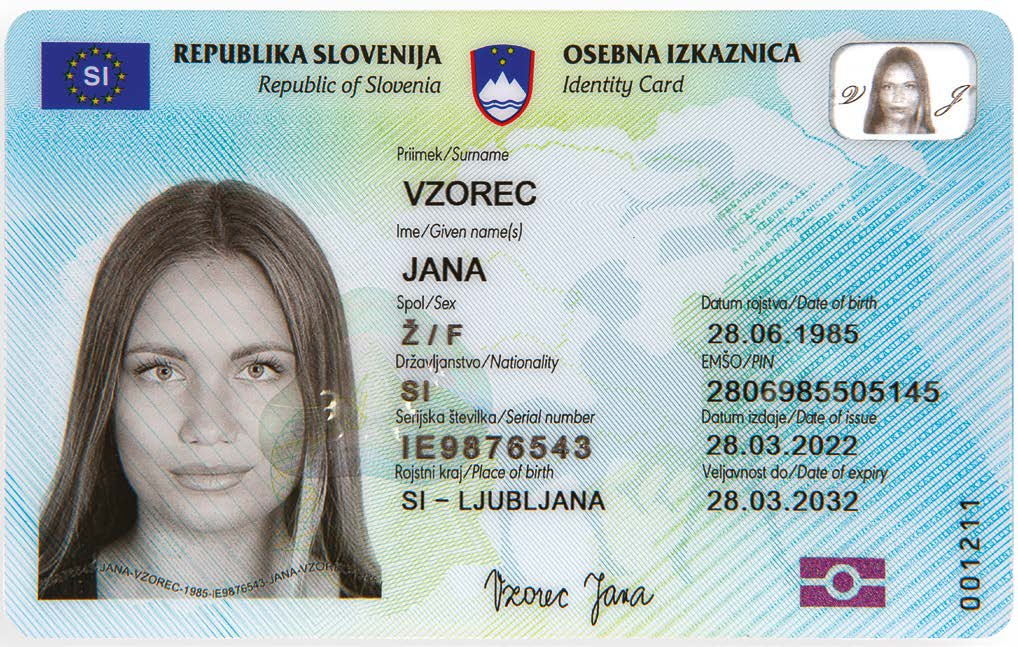
- Front of the card

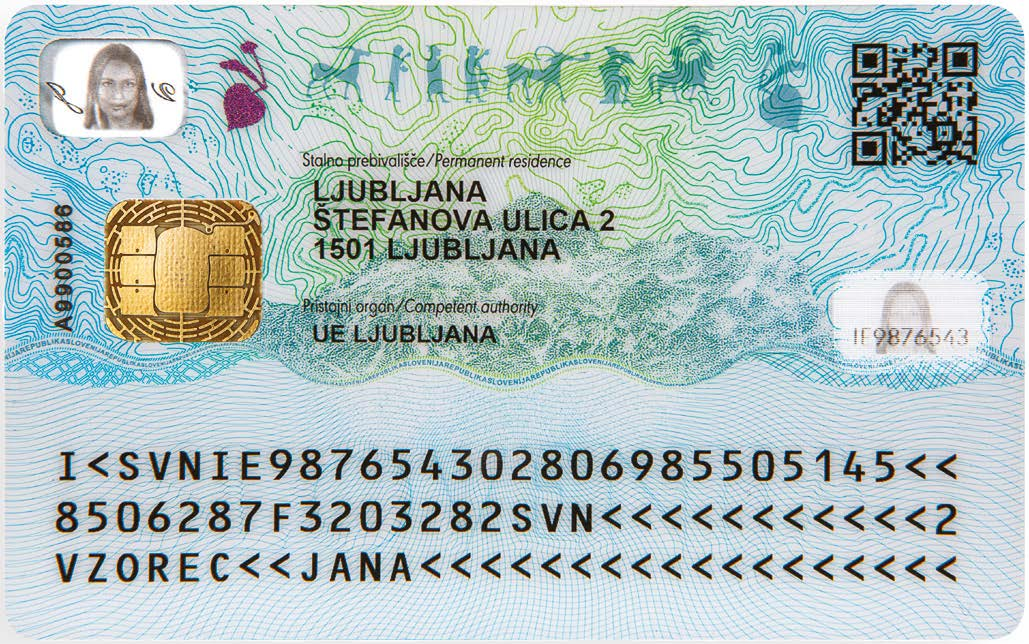
- Back of the card
- Type: identity document
- Issued by: Slovenia
- First issued: 20 June 1998 (modern format); 28 March 2022 (biometric)
- Purpose: Identification, travel, (biometric) healthcare
- Valid in: EFTA; European Union; United Kingdom (EU Settlement Scheme); Rest of Europe (except Belarus, Russia, and Ukraine) Georgia; Montserrat (max. 14 days); Overseas France
- Eligibility: Slovenian citizenship
- Expiration: No expiry (age >70); 10 years (age 18–70); 5 years (age 3–18); 3 years (age <3); 1 year (foreigners, specific circumstances)

Slovenian identity card (Slovene: osebna izkaznica) is issued to Slovenian citizens. It can be used as a travel document when visiting countries in Europe (except Belarus, Russia, and Ukraine), as well as Georgia, French overseas territories, Montserrat (for max. 14 days) and organized tours to Tunisia.

== Physical appearance ==
Version issued in 1998–2022

The front side displays the name and surname, sex, nationality, date of birth, and expiration date of the card, as well as the number of the ID card, a black and white photograph, and a signature. The back contains the permanent address, administrative unit, date of issue, EMŠO, and a code with key information in a machine-readable zone.

The words REPUBLIKA SLOVENIJA (English: Republic of Slovenia) are inscribed next to the coat of arms and the words Osebna izkaznica (English: Identity card) and Identity Card are inscribed below. Identity cards issued in officially bilingual areas of Slovenia also have Italian or Hungarian text next to the Slovene. These are REPUBBLICA DI SLOVENIA and Carta d’identità in Italian and SZLOVÉN KÖZTÁRSASÁG and Személyi igazolvány in Hungarian.

== Legal aspects ==
Every Slovenian citizen regardless of age has the right to acquire an identity card (Slovene: osebna izkaznica), and every citizen of the Republic of Slovenia of 18 years of age or older is obliged by law to acquire one and carry it at all times (or any other identity document with a picture, e.g. the Slovene passport or a driver's license). The card is a valid identity document within all member states of the European Union for travel within the EU. With the exception of the Faroe Islands and Greenland, it may be used to travel outside of the EU to Norway, Liechtenstein, BiH, North Macedonia, Montenegro, Serbia, and Switzerland. Depending on the holder's age, the card is valid for 5 years or 10 years or permanently, and it is valid 1 year for foreigners living in Slovenia, in case of repeated loss, and in some other circumstances. Since 28 March 2022, it is possible but not mandatory to acquire a biometric ID card. However all newly issued ID cards will be biometric. Since April 2023, the biometric ID card may be used in healthcare institutions instead of the healthcare insurance card.

== See also ==
- National identity cards in the European Union
