= Rhombic drive =

Method of transferring mechanical energy

Cut away diagram of a Rhombic Drive Beta Stirling Engine Design 1 (Pink) - Hot cylinder wall, 2 (Dark grey) - Cold cylinder wall (with coolant inlet and outlet pipes marked 3 in Yellow), 4 (Dark Green) - Thermal insulation separating the two cylinder ends, 5 (Light Green) - Displacer piston, 6 (Dark Blue) - Power piston, 7 (Light Blue) - Flywheels, Not Shown: external heat-source, and external heat-sinks. In this design the Displacer piston is used without a regenerator.

The rhombic drive is a specific method of transferring mechanical energy, or work, used when a single cylinder is used for two separately oscillating pistons.

== History ==
It was originally developed around 1900 for the twin-cylinder Lanchester car engine where it allowed perfect balancing of the inertial forces on both pistons. A current example of its use is on beta type-Stirling engines; the drive's complexity and tight tolerances, causing a high cost of manufacture, is a hurdle for the widespread usage of this drive.

== Operation ==
Schematic of a rhombic drive stirling engine in operation.

In its simplest form, the drive utilizes a jointed rhomboid to convert linear work from a reciprocating piston to rotational work. The connecting rod of the piston is rigid as opposed to a common reciprocating engine which directly connects the piston to the crankshaft with a flexible joint in the piston. Instead, the rod connects to one corner of a rhombus. When force is applied to the piston, it pushes down; at the same time, the outer corners of the rhomboid push out. They push on two cranks/flywheels which cause them to rotate, each in opposite directions. As the wheels rotate the rhombus progresses its change of shape from being flattened in the direction of the piston axis at top dead centre to being flattened in the perpendicular direction to the piston axis at bottom dead centre.

In the pictured example the left crank/flywheel turns clockwise and the right crank/flywheel anticlockwise. They turn at the same angular velocity and this can be reinforced by intermeshing them as gear wheels.
