= Ljubljana University Medical Centre =

Coordinates: 46°3′13.28″N 14°31′16.44″E

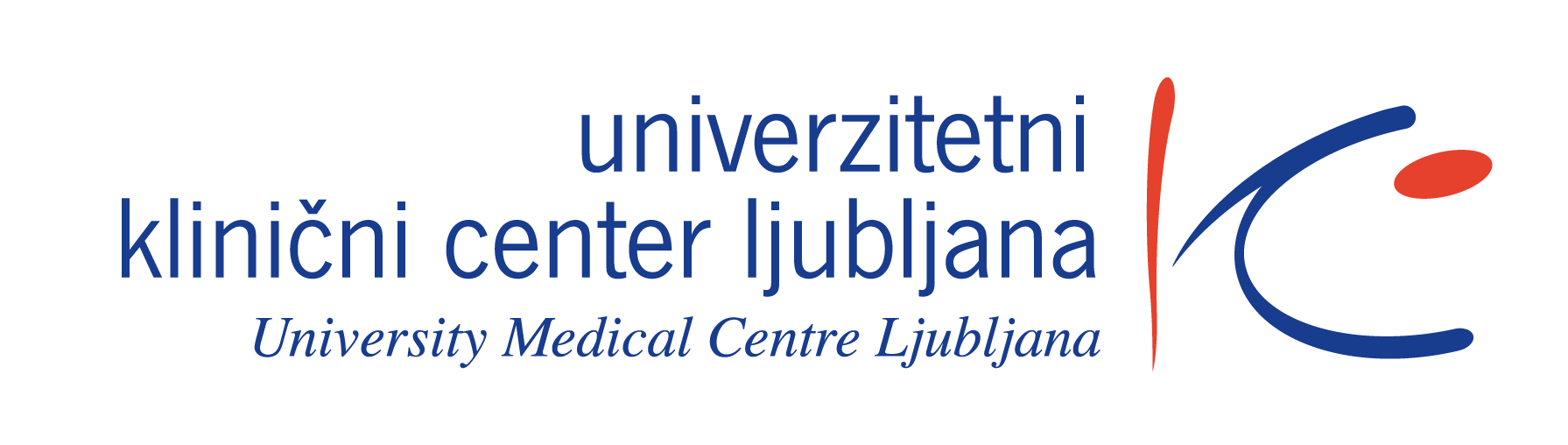

Geography
- Location: Zaloška cesta 2, 1000 Ljubljana, Slovenia

Organisation
- Type: Public; Academic Medical Center
- Affiliated university: University of Ljubljana

Services
- Emergency department: Yes
- Beds: 2,138

Helipads
- Helipad: Yes

History
- Founded: 29 November 1975; 50 years ago

Links
- Website: www.kclj.si
- Lists: Hospitals in Slovenia

The Ljubljana University Medical Centre (Slovene: Univerzitetni klinični center Ljubljana, abb. UKC Ljubljana) or Ljubljana UMC is the largest hospital centre in Slovenia based in Ljubljana. It was officially opened on 29 November 1975 and as of December 2019 had over 2,100 beds and over 8,300 employees, making it one of the largest hospital centres in Central Europe.

It is the main training base for the University of Ljubljana Faculty of Health Sciences and the Faculty of Medicine, which is housed nearby. Since February 2023, the Director General of the Ljubljana University Medical Centre has been the traumatologist Marko Jug.

The construction of the central building started in 1966 and was completed in 1975. The design was work by a group of architects led by Stanko Kristl (diagnostic, therapeutic, and service facilities – DTS) and the architect Janez Trenz (in-patient wards). In 2005, a company led by the architect Uroš V. Birsa designed a new emergency centre.

== History ==
- 1966: Start of construction works on the central building. The construction, which started on 13 July, took place according to the plans by Medico Engineering led by the Slovenian architect Stanko Kristl.
- 1975: Ceremonial opening of the Ljubljana UMC. The total price of the construction equaled 617 million Yugoslav dinars in 1975, which was recalculated to 617 million euro in 2020.
- 1980: The long-time president of the SFR Yugoslavia, Josip Broz Tito, dies of gangrene-induced infection in this hospital.
- 2006: Ljubljana Medical Centre renames itself into Ljubljana University Medical Centre, emphasising the collaboration of experts of different specialties and its role as a teaching hospital of the nearby medical faculty.
- 2007: Opening of a new building of the Division of Neurology (Nevrološka klinika), the Emergency Department of the Diagnostic and Therapeutic Services, and the heliport on the roof of the building; renovation of the Department of Otorhinolaryngology and Cervicofacial Surgery (Klinika za otorinolaringologijo in cervikofacialno kirurgijo).
- 2009: Opening of a new building of the Division of Paediatrics (Pediatrična klinika).
- 2010: The first ever robotic-assisted operation at the femoral vasculature is performed at the Department of Cardiovascular Surgery.
- 2016: Discovery of the first scientific evidence that the Zika virus infects the foetus brain through the infected mother and can cause permanent brain damage and microcephaly.
- 2018: Total nose reconstruction in two stages using only the patient's tissue; the nose was reconstructed on the forearm using a 3D model, following which the nose was placed on the face.
- 2018: Both lungs of a patient simultaneously transplanted for the first time.
- 2018: First auditory brainstem implant.
- 2019: First tumour surgery with removal of two complete lumbar vertebrae.
- 2020: Coping with the COVID-19 epidemic
- 2020: Innovative method of approach for coronary angiography and aortic valve replacement via the ascending aorta
- 2020: First lung transplantation in a child with simultaneous heart transplantation in another child
- 2022: Discovery of a gene for dilated cardiomyopathy, a severe heart muscle disease, and a gene linked to severe neurodevelopmental abnormalities in children

== See also ==
- List of hospitals in Slovenia
