= Stirling engine =

Closed-cycle regenerative heat engine

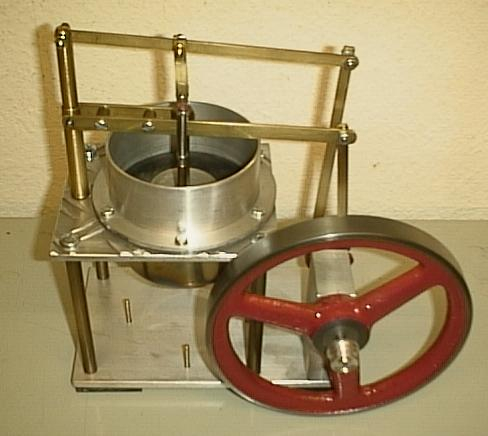
A model of a Stirling engine showing its simplicity. Unlike the steam engine or internal combustion engine, it has no valves or timing train. The heat source (not shown) would be placed under the brass cylinder.

Schematic of a rhombic drive Stirling engine in operation.

A Stirling engine is a heat engine that is operated by the cyclic expansion and contraction of air or other gas (the working fluid) by exposing it to different temperatures, resulting in a net conversion of heat energy to mechanical work.

More specifically, the Stirling engine is a closed-cycle regenerative heat engine, with a permanent gaseous working fluid. Closed-cycle, in this context, means a thermodynamic system in which the working fluid is permanently contained within the system. Regenerative describes the use of a specific type of internal heat exchanger and thermal store, known as the regenerator. Strictly speaking, the inclusion of the regenerator is what differentiates a Stirling engine from other closed-cycle hot air engines.

In the Stirling engine, a working fluid (e.g. air) is heated by energy supplied from outside the engine's interior space (cylinder). As the fluid expands, mechanical work is extracted by a piston, which is coupled to a displacer. The displacer moves the working fluid to a different location within the engine, where it is cooled, which creates a partial vacuum at the working cylinder, and more mechanical work is extracted. The displacer moves the cooled fluid back to the hot part of the engine, and the cycle continues.

A unique feature is the regenerator, which acts as a temporary heat store by retaining heat within the machine rather than dumping it into the heat sink, thereby increasing its efficiency.

The heat is supplied from the outside, so the hot area of the engine can be warmed with any external heat source. Similarly, the cooler part of the engine can be maintained by an external heat sink, such as running water or air flow. The gas is permanently retained in the engine, allowing a gas with the most-suitable properties to be used, such as helium or hydrogen. There are no intake and no exhaust gas flows so the machine is practically silent. The machine is reversible so that if the shaft is turned by an external power source a temperature difference will develop across the machine; in this way it acts as a heat pump.

The Stirling engine was invented by Scotsman Robert Stirling in 1816 as an industrial prime mover to rival the steam engine, and its practical use was largely confined to low-power domestic applications for over a century.

Contemporary investment in renewable energy, especially solar energy, has given rise to its application within concentrated solar power and as a heat pump.

== History ==
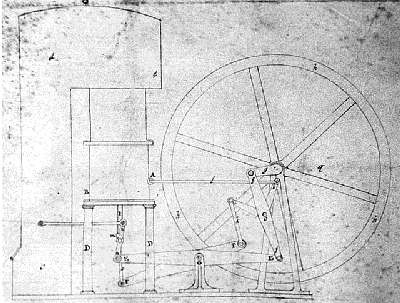
Illustration from Robert Stirling's 1816 patent application of the air-engine design that later became known as the Stirling engine

=== Invention and 19th-century development ===
The Stirling engine was invented by Scottish clergyman Robert Stirling, who patented his air engine in 1816. Stirling's patent also described a heat exchanger that he called an "economiser". In a Stirling engine this component stores heat from the working gas during one part of the cycle and returns it during another; it later became known as the regenerator.

An engine built to Stirling's design was used in 1818 to pump water at a quarry in Ayrshire. Robert Stirling and his brother James Stirling subsequently developed improved versions of the engine. Their work included further patents and the use of pressurised working gas to increase power output.

By the early 1840s, James Stirling had constructed a larger engine for a foundry in Dundee. In 1845 he presented a description of the engine to the Institution of Civil Engineers. The Dundee installation demonstrated that the design could provide industrial-scale power, but repeated failures of components exposed to high temperatures contributed to its eventual replacement by a steam engine.

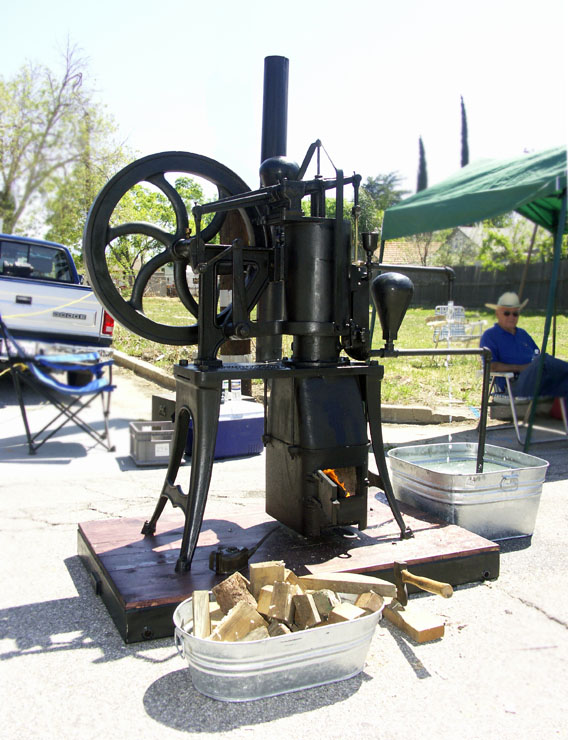
A late nineteenth- or early twentieth-century hot-air water-pumping engine associated with the Rider-Ericsson Engine Company

After the large Dundee engine was abandoned, Stirling-type and other hot air engines continued to be developed mainly for lower-power applications. From about the 1860s, small hot-air engines were produced for uses including water pumping and supplying air to church organs. Their relatively simple operation was an advantage where the supervision required by contemporary steam engines was undesirable.

By the beginning of the twentieth century, electric motors and small internal combustion engines increasingly replaced hot-air engines in many of these applications. By the late 1930s, Stirling engines survived mainly in specialised small-scale uses until renewed development work began at Philips.

=== 20th-century revival ===
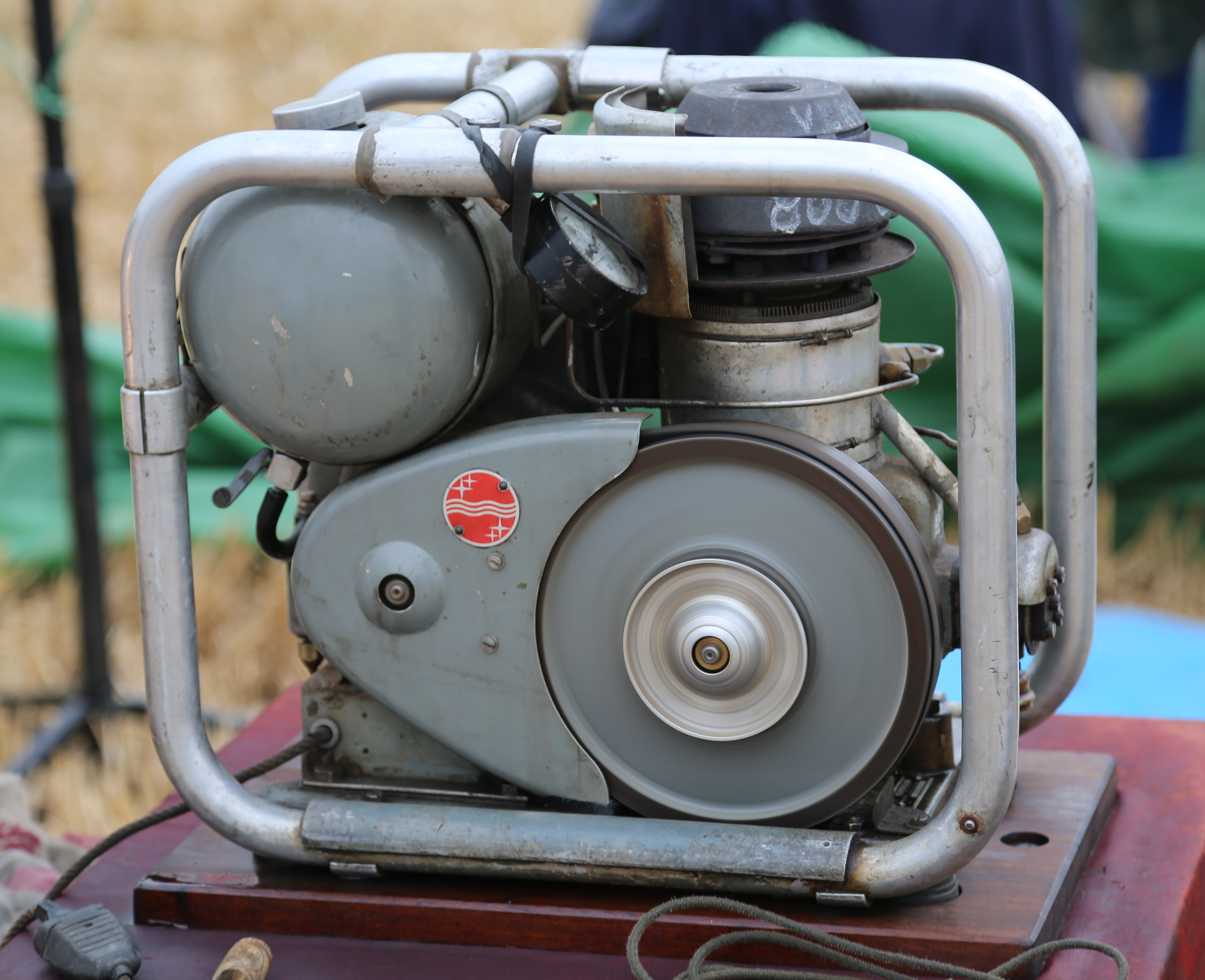
Philips MP1002CA Stirling generator of 1951

Philips began investigating Stirling engines in the late 1930s while looking for a small generator capable of powering radio equipment in places without reliable electricity supplies. Engineers at the company's research laboratory in Eindhoven selected the Stirling engine partly because it could operate quietly and could use several heat sources.

By 1951 Philips had developed the MP1002CA generator set, commonly called the "Bungalow set". The unit produced about 180–200 watts of electrical power. Approximately 150 units were manufactured, but falling power requirements for transistor radios and the cost of producing the generator limited its commercial prospects.

Philips continued Stirling-engine research for several decades. Although its prime-mover programmes did not achieve large-scale commercial adoption, the company's work contributed substantially to modern Stirling-engine technology, and Stirling-cycle cryocoolers became a commercially important application.

=== Automotive Engines ===
Beginning in 1978, the National Air and Space Administration began a program, funded by the US Department of Energy, to develop a unconventional automotive engine to increase fuel efficiency over conventional, internal combustion engines. The program focused on developing a Stirling engine for automotive use and proceeded through two major designs, the Mod I and II engines. The final engine, installed in a 1985 Chevrolet Celebrity, showed an increase in fuel economy of 32% over the factory Celebrity, and approximately 50% over the average fuel economy of cars at the time.

=== Submarine propulsion ===
Stirling engines have been used as air-independent propulsion (AIP) systems in conventionally powered submarines. The Swedish Navy began sea trials of a Stirling AIP system aboard the submarine Näcken in the late 1980s, and the system was subsequently incorporated into the Gotland class.

The Gotland-class submarines were delivered in 1995–1996 with Stirling AIP installed from the outset. Their engines use liquid oxygen so that the combustion process does not require atmospheric air, allowing the submarines to remain submerged for extended periods.

Stirling AIP was subsequently used in other Swedish submarines and in Singapore's Archer class. Japanese Sōryū-class submarines were also built with Kawasaki Kockums Stirling engines; Kawasaki stated that the system increased their underwater endurance.

=== 21st-century developments ===
Stirling engines have been developed for dish-based concentrated solar power systems. In a dish/Stirling system, a concentrating reflector focuses solar radiation onto a thermal receiver, which supplies heat to a Stirling engine connected to an electrical generator.

Stirling engines have also been investigated for residential micro combined heat and power systems, in which the engine produces electricity while heat rejected from the system is recovered for space heating or hot water. A Canadian residential demonstration tested a natural-gas Stirling micro-CHP unit during the winter and spring of 2003.

Research has also examined the miniaturisation of free-piston Stirling engines. A 2013 study developed scaling laws based on six dimensionless groups to investigate the effects of reducing engine size on power density, heat transfer, leakage and other losses.

NASA has considered nuclear-decay heated Stirling Engines for extended missions to the outer solar system. In 2018, NASA and the United States Department of Energy announced that they had successfully tested a new type of nuclear reactor called KRUSTY, which stands for "Kilopower Reactor Using Stirling TechnologY", and which is designed to be able to power deep space vehicles and probes as well as exoplanetary encampments.

At the 2012 Cable-Tec Expo put on by the Society of Cable Telecommunications Engineers, Dean Kamen took the stage with Time Warner Cable Chief Technology Officer Mike LaJoie to announce a new initiative between his company Deka Research and the SCTE. Kamen refers to it as a Stirling engine.

In 2025, Tristan J. Deppe and Jeremy N. Munday demonstrated mechanical power generation using a Stirling engine driven by a temperature difference produced through radiative cooling to the sky. Their experiments also demonstrated airflow sufficient for applications including greenhouse circulation and building ventilation.

== Name and classification ==
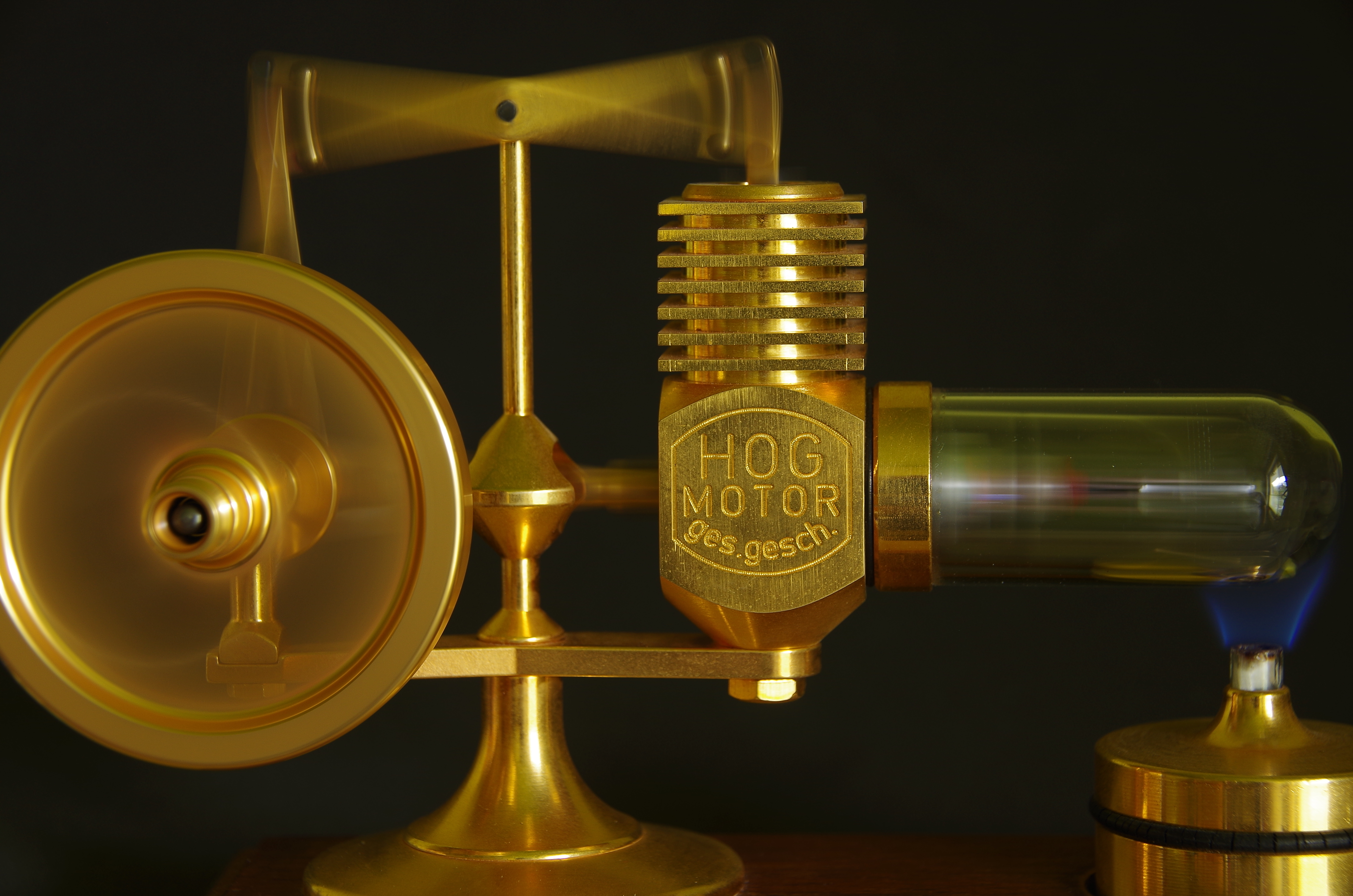
Stirling engine running

The name "Stirling engine" derives from Robert Stirling, whose 1816 patent described the closed-cycle air engine and its economiser. During the nineteenth century, related machines were often described more broadly as hot air engines and were also identified by the names of their designers or manufacturers.

During its twentieth-century research programme, Philips adopted the term Stirling engine for its regenerated closed-cycle machines in 1945. The terminology subsequently became widely used in engineering literature.

A Stirling engine is a closed-cycle regenerative heat engine in which a fixed quantity of gaseous working fluid is cyclically compressed at a lower temperature and expanded at a higher temperature. Heat is transferred to and from the working gas through heat exchangers rather than by combustion within the working fluid.

Because heat enters the working fluid through a boundary rather than through combustion within the working gas, Stirling engines are commonly classified as external combustion engines when combustion is used as the heat source. The same thermodynamic arrangement can also use non-combustion heat sources such as solar, nuclear or waste heat.

Most conventional Stirling engines are reciprocating piston engines, although free-piston and other configurations have also been developed.

== Efficiency ==
Theoretical thermal efficiency equals that of the ideal Carnot cycle, i.e. the highest efficiency attainable by any heat engine. However, though it is useful for illustrating general principles, practical Stirling engines deviate substantially from the ideal. It has been argued that its use in many standard books on engineering thermodynamics has done a disservice to the study of Stirling engines in general.

Stirling engines are capable of quiet operation and can use almost any heat source. The heat energy source is generated external to the Stirling engine rather than by internal combustion as with the Otto cycle or Diesel cycle engines. This type of engine is currently generating interest as the core component of micro combined heat and power (CHP) units, in which it is more efficient and safer than a comparable steam engine. However, it has a low power-to-weight ratio, rendering it more suitable for use in static installations where space and weight are not at a premium.

Other real-world issues reduce the efficiency of actual engines, due to the limits of convective heat transfer and viscous flow (friction). There are also practical, mechanical considerations: for instance, a simple kinematic linkage may be favoured over a more complex mechanism needed to replicate the idealized cycle, and limitations imposed by available materials such as non-ideal properties of the working gas, thermal conductivity, tensile strength, creep, rupture strength, and melting point. A question that often arises is whether the ideal cycle with isothermal expansion and compression is in fact the correct ideal cycle to apply to the Stirling engine. Professor C. J. Rallis has pointed out that it is very difficult to imagine any condition where the expansion and compression spaces may approach isothermal behavior and it is far more realistic to imagine these spaces as adiabatic. An ideal analysis where the expansion and compression spaces are taken to be adiabatic with isothermal heat exchangers and perfect regeneration was analyzed by Rallis and presented as a better ideal yardstick for Stirling machinery. He called this cycle the 'pseudo-Stirling cycle' or 'ideal adiabatic Stirling cycle'. An important consequence of this ideal cycle is that it does not predict Carnot efficiency. A further conclusion of this ideal cycle is that maximum efficiencies are found at lower compression ratios, a characteristic observed in real machines. In an independent work, T. Finkelstein also assumed adiabatic expansion and compression spaces in his analysis of Stirling machinery.

The ideal Stirling cycle is unattainable in the real world, as with any heat engine. The efficiency of Stirling machines is also linked to the environmental temperature: higher efficiency is obtained when the weather is cooler, thus making this type of engine less attractive in places with warmer climates. As with other external combustion engines, Stirling engines can use heat sources other than the combustion of fuels. For example, various designs for solar-powered Stirling engines have been developed.

== Applications ==
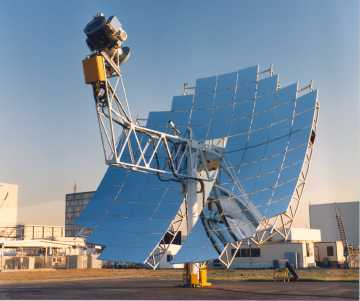
Dish Stirling from SES

Applications of the Stirling engine range from heating and cooling to underwater power systems. A Stirling engine can function in reverse as a heat pump for heating or cooling. Other uses include combined heat and power, solar power generation, Stirling cryocoolers, heat pump, marine engines, low power model aircraft engines, and low temperature difference engines.

== See also ==
- Bore
- Cost of electricity by source
- Distributed generation
- John Ericsson
- Schmidt number#Stirling engines
- Stroke
- Thermoelectric generator
- Thermomechanical generator
- Francis Herbert Wenham

== General and cited references ==
- E.H. Cooke-Yarborough; E. Franklin; J. Geisow; R. Howlett; C.D. West (1974). "Harwell Thermo-Mechanical Generator". Proceedings of the 9th IECEC. San Francisco: American Society of Mechanical Engineers. pp. 1132–1136. Bibcode:1974iece.conf.1132C.
- E.H. Cooke-Yarborough (1970). "Heat Engines", US patent 3548589 Archived 21 June 2008 at the Wayback Machine. Granted to Atomic Energy Authority UK, 22 December 1970.
- E.H. Cooke-Yarborough (1967). "A Proposal for a Heat-Powered Nonrotating Electrical Alternator", Harwell Memorandum AERE-M881.
- T. Finkelstein; A.J. Organ (2001). Air Engines. Professional Engineering Publishing. ISBN 1-86058-338-5.
- C.M. Hargreaves (1991). The Philips Stirling Engine. Elsevier Science. ISBN 0-444-88463-7.
- A.J. Organ (1992). Thermodynamics and Gas Dynamics of the Stirling Cycle Machine. Cambridge University Press. ISBN 0-521-41363-X.
- R. Sier (1995). Reverend Robert Stirling D.D: A Biography of the Inventor of the Heat Economiser and Stirling Cycle Engine. L.A Mair. ISBN 0-9526417-0-4.
