= Thermomechanical generator =

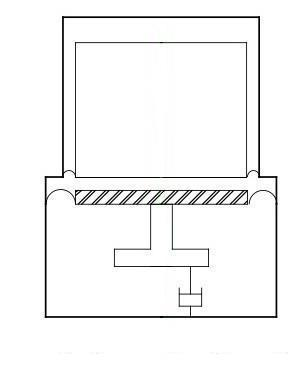
Freebody diagram; modeling the interaction of the piston with the case

The Harwell TMG Stirling engine, an abbreviation for "Thermo-Mechanical Generator", was invented in 1967 by E. H. Cooke-Yarborough at the Harwell Labs of the United Kingdom Atomic Energy Authority. It was intended to be a remote electrical power source with low cost and very long life, albeit by sacrificing some efficiency. The TMG (model TMG120) was at one time the only Stirling engine sold by a manufacturer, namely HoMach Systems Ltd., England.

== Description ==
The engine has near isothermal cylinders because 1) the heater area covers the entire cylinder end, 2) it is a short stroke device, with wide shallow cylinders, yielding a high surface area to volume ratio, 3) the average thickness of the gas space is about 0.1 cm, and 4) the working fluid is Helium, a gas having good thermal properties for Stirling engines.

The engine's displacer also has very low losses. These low-loss operating characteristics simplify the engine analysis, compared to more conventional Stirling engines.

The design has many advantages over conventional Stirling engines. The simplicity of the heater greatly reduces the cost by allowing the TMG to avoid the need for a brazed tubular or finned heater, which can account for 40% of the cost of a conventional Stirling engine. The heat exchangers for the heater and cooler are mechanically trivial. The regenerator is a simple annulus, referred to as a "flat plate". Along with the cylinder wall and the displacer, there are a total of four regenerating surfaces. The TMG is a free piston engine. There are no rolling bearings or sliding seals, thus there is very little friction or wear. The working space is hermetically sealed, allowing it to contain pressurized helium gas for many thousands of hours.

The displacer is a stainless steel can, 27 cm in diameter. It is suspended by a low-loss planer metal spring centered in a 27.4 cm diameter cylinder. The 2 mm radial clearance is divided into two concentric annular gaps by a thin, open-ended cylinder, which is fixed to the engine's cylinder. This annulus acts as the regenerator, which is much less costly than a wire-mesh type.

The engine is a "free-cylinder" design, in which the entire engine is mounted on springs and allowed to vibrate slightly. This allows the displacer to be driven by positive feedback from the motion of the power piston and the magnets in the linear-alternator magnets, which have a combined weight of 10 kg.

Engine Parameter	HoMach TMG 120 Spec
Indicated power	170 W
Shaft power	150 W
Heat input	1500 W
Thermal to mechanical efficiency	10%
Engine frequency	110 Hz
charge Pressure	0.2 MPa
Displacer diameter	26.0 cm
displacer stroke	0.2 cm
Displacer swept volume	110 cm^{3}
Power piston diaphragm outer diameter	35.2 cm
Power piston diaphragm stroke	0.152 cm
Power piston diaphragm swept volume	110 cm^{3}
Phase angle	~90 degrees
Moving mass (Power piston and alternator magnets)	10 kg
Total engine mass	~80 kg
Operating life	over 90000 hours
Helium replenishment (7 liters, at unknown pressure)	every 22500 hours on average

The unique power piston was invented by Cooke-Yarborough, and is called an "articulated diaphragm". It consists of a stainless steel annulus, with an outer diameter of 35 cm and an inner diameter of 26 cm. This annulus is clamped to the engine on the outer edge by two flexible rubber o-rings, and on the inner edge it is similarly clamped, in this case to a rigid center hub that makes up the piston's center. The o-rings flex but do not slide, thus no lubricant is needed and there is negligible wear in the entire machine.

The compression space is located between the power-piston hub and the displacer, and this space is cooled by direct conduction through the power piston. A developmental model of the TMG contained a double articulated diaphragm containing cooling water, which was pumped by a thermosyphon. The depth of the compression space varies from 0.2 to 2.7 mm, as governed by the 2 mm displacer stroke and the 1.5 mm power piston stroke moving 90 degrees out of phase.

The TMG engine successfully overcomes many of the economic and mechanical difficulties common in conventional Stirling engines. However, there are some limitations of this design. The simple, low-cost annular regenerator is inefficient compared to other types, (and this contributes to this engine's somewhat low thermal efficiency of only 10%). The mechanical limitations of the articulated diaphragm only allow a maximum stroke of an estimated 3 mm. These properties limit the maximum obtainable power to about 500 - 1000 Watts from an engine of this design. Nevertheless, it is rare for a low-cost Stirling engine to obtain this high level of reliability and operating life, which can only be attributed to the ingenuity of the design.
