= List of hospitals in Slovenia =

Map of medical centres and general hospitals in Slovenia:
Medical centre
General hospital
Planned general hospital

This is a list of hospitals and other public health institutions in Slovenia.

Medical centres

- Ljubljana University Medical Centre – Ljubljana
- Maribor University Medical Centre – Maribor
- (Planned) Primorska University Medical Centre - Izola

General hospitals

- Brežice General Hospital – Brežice
- Celje General Hospital – Celje
- Izola General Hospital – Izola
- Jesenice General Hospital – Jesenice
- (Planned) Kranj General Hospital – Kranj
- Murska Sobota General Hospital – Murska Sobota
- Dr Franc Derganc General Hospital of Nova Gorica – Šempeter pri Gorici
- Novo Mesto General Hospital – Novo Mesto
- Dr Jože Potrč General Hospital of Ptuj – Ptuj
- Slovenj Gradec General Hospital – Slovenj Gradec
- Trbovlje General Hospital – Trbovlje

Psychiatric hospitals

- Begunje Psychiatric Hospital – Begunje
- Idrija Psychiatric Hospital – Idrija
- Ljubljana University Psychiatric Clinic – Ljubljana
- Ormož Psychiatric Hospital – Ormož
- Vojnik Psychiatric Hospital – Vojnik

Special hospitals

- Golnik University Clinic of Respiratory and Allergic Diseases – Golnik
- Kranj Gynecology and Obstetrics Hospital – Kranj
- Ljubljana Institute of Oncology – Ljubljana
- Postojna Obstetrics and Gynaecology Hospital – Postojna
- Šentvid pri Stični Centre for Children's Health Care – Šentvid pri Stični
- Topolšica Hospital – Topolšica
- University Rehabilitation Institute, Republic of Slovenia – Ljubljana
- Valdoltra Orthopedic Hospital – Valdoltra
