= Têxtil Manuel Gonçalves =

Têxtil Manuel Gonçalves (TMG) is a Portuguese family-owned conglomerate headquartered in Vila Nova de Famalicão, founded in 1937. The company, which in the beginning was solely devoted to textile industry, is nowadays very diverse. Besides textiles, it includes businesses and investments in several other industries, including automotive interiors, plastics, wineries, energy, financial services, electromechanics, air transportation and retail.
