= Health Insurance Institute of Slovenia =

The Health Insurance Institute of Slovenia (Slovene: Zavod za zdravstveno zavarovanje Slovenije) was founded on March 1, 1992, according to the Health Care and Health Insurance Act (Slovene: Zakon o zdravstvenem varstvu in zdravstvenem zavarovanju), after declaring independence from Yugoslavia. It conducts its business as a public institute, bound by statute to provide compulsory health insurance. The Institute's principal task is to provide effective collection (mobilisation) and distribution (allocation) of public funds, in order to ensure the insured persons quality rights arising from the said funds.

Health insurance is compulsory and voluntary. Compulsory health insurance is provided by the Health Insurance Institute of Slovenia, and voluntary health insurance is carried out by other health insurance companies. Voluntary health insurance comprises supplemental health insurance (dopolnilno zdravstveno zavarovanje) and additional health insurance (Slovene: dodatno zdravstveno zavarovanje), the first covering the full cost of a number of common healthcare services and the second providing for superior standard of hospital treatment and some other premium rights. Supplemental health insurance will cease on 1 January 2024, and the monthly cost of 35 euros will become part of the compulsory health insurance.

The Institute comprises 10 regional units and 45 branch offices distributed around the territory of Slovenia. The Information Centre and the Directorate complete the Institute's structure. At the end of 2019, the Institute staff numbered regular 950 employees. The Institute is governed by an Assembly, whose members are the (elected) representatives of employers (including the representatives of the Government of the Republic of Slovenia) and employees. The executive body of the Assembly is the Institute Board of Directors.

The Slovene health insurance card (kartica zdravstvenega zavarovanja) system was introduced, at the national scale, in the year 1999. The system provides the insured persons with a smart card. The card carries the identification number (HIIS number), the card issue number, the name and surname of the cardholder, gender, and date of birth. Data links are established between the health care service providers and health insurance providers (the Health Insurance Institute and the two voluntary health insurance providers). Medical records are accessed by a healthcare professional using a double card reader. The professional's card controls their level of access. Since April 2023, a biometric identity card, which contains healthcare identity data and some other healthcare information, may be used in healthcare institutions instead of the healthcare insurance card.

== See also ==
- List of hospitals in Slovenia
- List of Slovenian physicians
- Ljubljana Central Pharmacy
