= Magdalena District, Maribor =

Coordinates: 46°33′03″N 15°38′17″E

The Magdalena District (pronounced [maɡdaˈleːna]; Slovene: Mestna četrt Magdalena) is a city district of the City Municipality of Maribor in northeastern Slovenia. In 2014, the district had a population of 6,439. Maribor University Medical Centre is located in the district.
