= Solar-powered Stirling engine =

Technology used in concentrated solar power stations

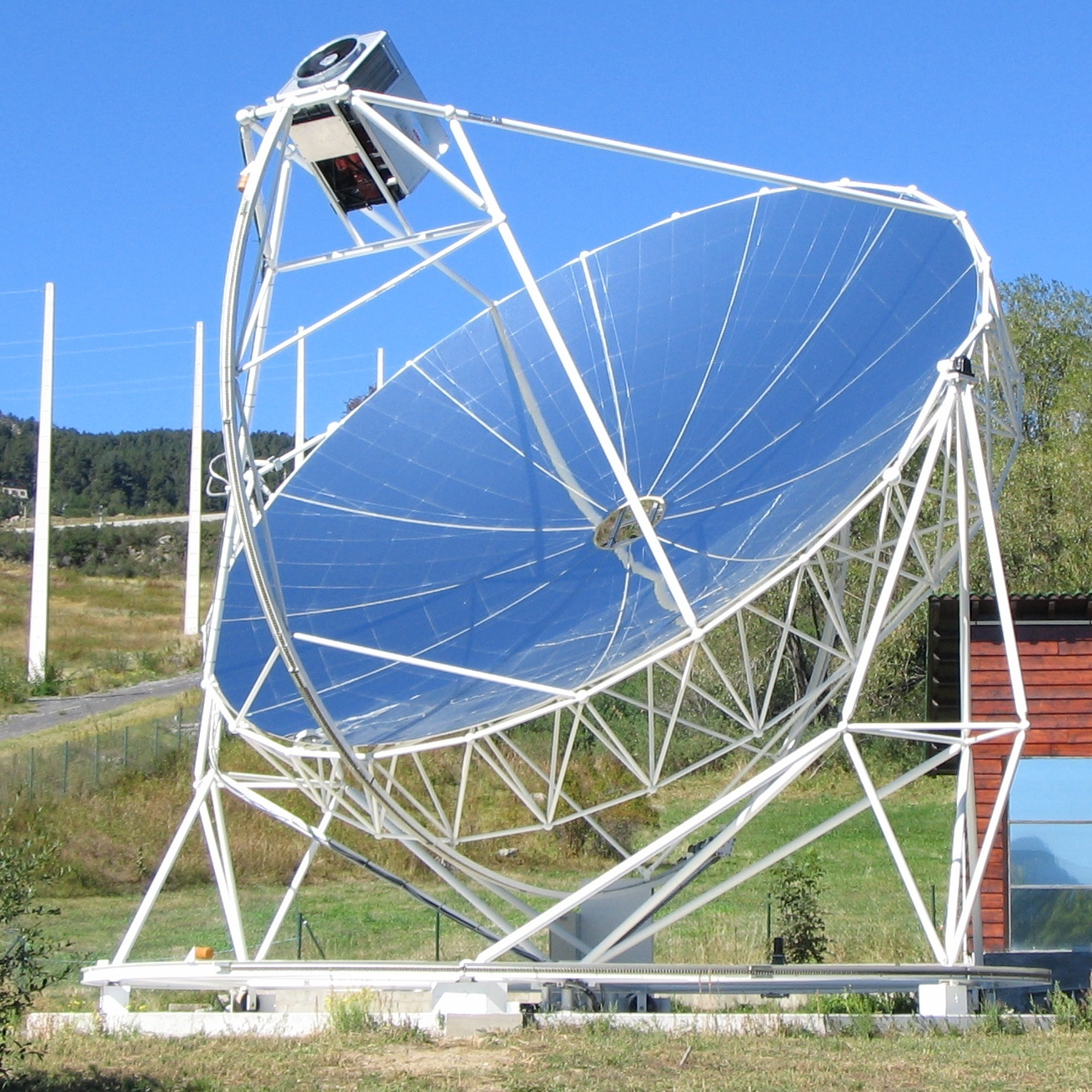
10 kW Dish-Stirling system in Font-Romeu-Odeillo, France

A solar powered Stirling engine is a heat engine powered by a temperature gradient generated by the sun. Even though Stirling engines can run with a small temperature gradient, it is more efficient to use concentrated solar power.

The mechanical output can be used directly (e.g. pumps) or be used to create electricity.

== Pumps ==
=== NASA ===
NASA patented a type of solar-powered Stirling engine on August 3, 1976. It used solar energy to pump water from a river, lake, or stream. The purpose of this apparatus is to “provide a low-cost, low-technology pump having particular utility in irrigation systems employed in underdeveloped arid regions of the earth…[using] the basic principles of the Stirling heat engine“.

=== Meijer ===
Another design was patented by Roelf J. Meijer in 1987. His invention combines a heat engine, such as a Stirling cycle engine, with a solar dish collector to produce electricity. This apparatus consists of a large dish that concentrates solar energy to a focal point at the center of the dish. The concentrated solar energy drives a Stirling cycle engine, which operates by letting heat flow from a hot source to a cold sink to do work. The work output of the Stirling cycle then drives a generator to create electric power. Moreover, for optimal heat collection, Meijer’s solar-powered engine requires that the dish always point directly at the sun so no shadows are in the solar dish collector. This presented issues because, for the apparatus to have a complete range of motion, lubrication and rotational systems are necessary, and may compromise structural stability.

=== Sunvention ===
Around 2010, a company called Sunvention Solar Energy created a device similar to the NASA design that they say can pump 100,000 gallons per day, purely off of solar energy and the Stirling cycle, and costing only US$1,250. This apparatus, much like the others, used a large solar dish to collect heat from the sun to create a high temperature source, and also used low temperature water from a nearby stream as its low temperature source. This provided a great temperature range, which in turn provided more power. The apparatus pumped the water into nearby crop fields, providing a “low-cost, low-technology pump having particular utility in irrigation systems employed in underdeveloped arid regions of the earth.”

== Electrical Power ==
=== Solar to Electrical Conversion Efficiency ===
Stirling engines using parabolic solar concentration hold records for the highest efficiency of any thermal conversion system in converting solar energy to electrical power (although the record efficiency of photovoltaic panels is somewhat higher.)

The Electric Power Research Institute (EPRI) reported that a 25-kW Vanguard Dish Stirling system, using a parabolic mirror to concentrate sunlight at a focal point and a Stirling engine to convert the heat to electrical power, reached a maximum instantaneous conversion efficiency (sunlight to electrical power) of 31.6% during an 18-month test in 1986. The average conversion efficiency (of 25.2%) was lower.

In 2008, Sandia reported that their high efficiency "SunCatcher" design recorded a peak solar-to-grid conversion efficiency of 31.25%, "the highest recorded efficiency for any field solar technology."

In 2017, the U.S. Department of Energy reported a slightly higher record at 31.4% solar-to-electric system efficiency.

=== Comparison to Solar Panels ===
Solar-powered Stirling engines in some situations may be more useful in generating electrical energy than solar panels. Thermal capacity and rotating mass result in less sudden changes in output power. Experiments show the possibility of higher efficiencies.

Solar-powered Stirling engines are less scalable than solar panels, and also more complex than a solar-electric system. They also require two-axis accurate solar tracking, unlike solar panels.

Solar-powered Stirling engines can have a secondary heat source (e.g. Gas), allowing operation during night and when the sky is clouded.

== See also ==
- Solar thermal energy#Dish designs
- Stirling Energy Systems
