= Slovenian nationality law =

Slovenian Citizenship Act

Parliament of Slovenia
- Long title: An Act relating to Slovenian citizenship
- Enacted by: Government of Slovenia
- Status: Current legislation

Slovenian nationality law is based primarily on the principles of jus sanguinis, in that descent from a Slovenian parent is the primary basis for acquisition of Slovenian citizenship. However, although children born to foreign parents in Slovenia do not acquire Slovenian citizenship on the basis of birthplace, place of birth is relevant for determining whether the child of Slovenian parents acquires citizenship.

Slovenia became independent from Yugoslavia on June 25, 1991, and transitional provisions were made for the acquisition of Slovenian citizenship by certain former Yugoslav citizens.

Dual citizenship is permitted in Slovenia, with the exception that those acquiring Slovenian citizenship by naturalisation are normally required to renounce any foreign citizenship they hold.

== Transitional provisions on independence - 25 June 1991 ==
Prior to independence in 1991, Slovenians were citizens of Yugoslavia. However, within Yugoslavia an internal "citizenship of the Republic of Slovenia" existed, and at independence any Yugoslav citizen who held this internal "Slovenian citizenship" automatically became a Slovenian citizen.

Certain other former Yugoslav citizens were permitted to acquire Slovenian citizenship under transitional provisions:

- a Yugoslav citizen connected with another republic who was resident in Slovenia on 23 December 1990 and remained resident in Slovenia until the coming into force of the Slovenia Nationality Act, together with that person's children aged under 18
- a person aged between 18 and 23 who was born in Slovenia, with parents who originally held internal Slovene citizenship within Yugoslavia but switched to citizenship of another Yugoslav republic.

== Citizenship by birth and adoption ==
A child born in Slovenia is a Slovenian citizen if either parent is a Slovenian citizen

Where the child is born outside Slovenia the child will be automatically Slovenian if:

- both parents are Slovenian citizens; or
- one parent is Slovenian and the other is stateless; or
- the child does not have any other citizenship.

A person born outside Slovenia with one Slovenian parent who is not Slovenian automatically may acquire Slovenian citizenship through:

- an application for registration as a Slovenian citizen made at any time before age 36; or
- taking up permanent residence in Slovenia before age 18

Children adopted by Slovenian citizens may be granted Slovenian citizenship.

== Citizenship by naturalization ==
A person may acquire Slovenian citizenship by naturalization upon satisfying the following conditions:

- a total of 10 years residence in Slovenia, including 5 years continuous residence before the application
- renunciation of foreign citizenship (or providing proof it will automatically be lost).
- competency in Slovene
- good character
- aged at least 18
- sufficiently established in Slovenia so as not to require welfare payments

Exceptions to the requirements for naturalization

- those who have emigrated from Slovenia (and those of Slovenian ancestry up to the fourth generation in direct descent) may be naturalized after one year's residence in Slovenia. Renunciation of foreign citizenship is not required under this concession.
- a person who is married to a Slovenian citizen for at least three years may be naturalized after one year's residence in Slovenia
- the requirement to renounce foreign citizenship may be waived upon special application.
- a general waiver to the naturalization requirements can be made based on the national interests of Slovenia
- a person of "Slovenian origin" up to the second generation in direct descent or a former Slovenian citizen may be naturalized without any residence requirements. The application for Slovenian citizenship can be lodged with a Slovenian diplomatic mission from abroad. In this case, the applicant is required to prove his/her active ties with the Republic of Slovenia, i.e. his/her active participation over several years in Slovenian associations, Slovenian-language schools, expatriate or national minority organizations. The Government Office of the Republic of Slovenia for Slovenes Abroad, which is the authority competent for evaluating the existence of national reasons in concrete terms, gives a positive opinion in cases when the applicant is a person of Slovenian origin and when he/she has proven the existence of his/her active ties with the Republic of Slovenia.

Children aged under 18 can normally be naturalized alongside their parent, if resident in Slovenia. Those aged 14 or over must normally give their own consent.

== Deprivation of citizenship ==
=== Involuntary deprivation of citizenship ===
Involuntary deprivation of citizenship occurred in Slovenia during a period of 'identity erasure' whereby a number of vital records and registries were cleansed of people when the former Yugoslavia collapsed. Involuntary deprivation of Slovenian citizenship may only occur, though, when the Slovenian holds a second nationality, and only deprived in circumstances of which are based on "activities ... contrary to the international and other interests of the Republic of Slovenia". These are generally defined as:

- if the person is a member of any organisation engaged in the activities to overthrow the Constitutional order of the Republic of Slovenia; or
- if a person is a member of a foreign intelligence service and as such jeopardises the interests of the Republic of Slovenia or if he/she harms such interests by serving under any government authority or organisation of a foreign State;
- if the person is a persistent perpetrator of criminal offences prosecuted ex officio and of offences against public order;
- if the person refuses to carry out the duty of the citizen of the Republic of Slovenia prescribed by the Constitution and the Law

=== Voluntary deprivation of citizenship ===
Slovenian citizens who possess another nationality may normally renounce Slovenian citizenship if resident outside Slovenia.

== Dual citizenship ==
Dual citizenship is restricted but not prohibited in Slovenia. Persons who become Slovenian through naturalisation may be required to renounce their former nationality upon acquisition of Slovenian nationality. Slovenians by birth who hold a multiple nationality may be subject to circumstances where they can be legally deprived of their citizenship in certain circumstances.

== Citizenship of the European Union ==
Because Slovenia forms part of the European Union, Slovenian citizens are also citizens of the European Union under European Union law and thus enjoy rights of free movement and have the right to vote in elections for the European Parliament. When in a non-EU country where there is no Slovenian embassy, Slovenian citizens have the right to get consular protection from the embassy of any other EU country present in that country. Slovenian citizens can live and work in any country within the EU as a result of the right of free movement and residence granted in Article 21 of the EU Treaty.

== Travel freedom of Slovenian citizens ==
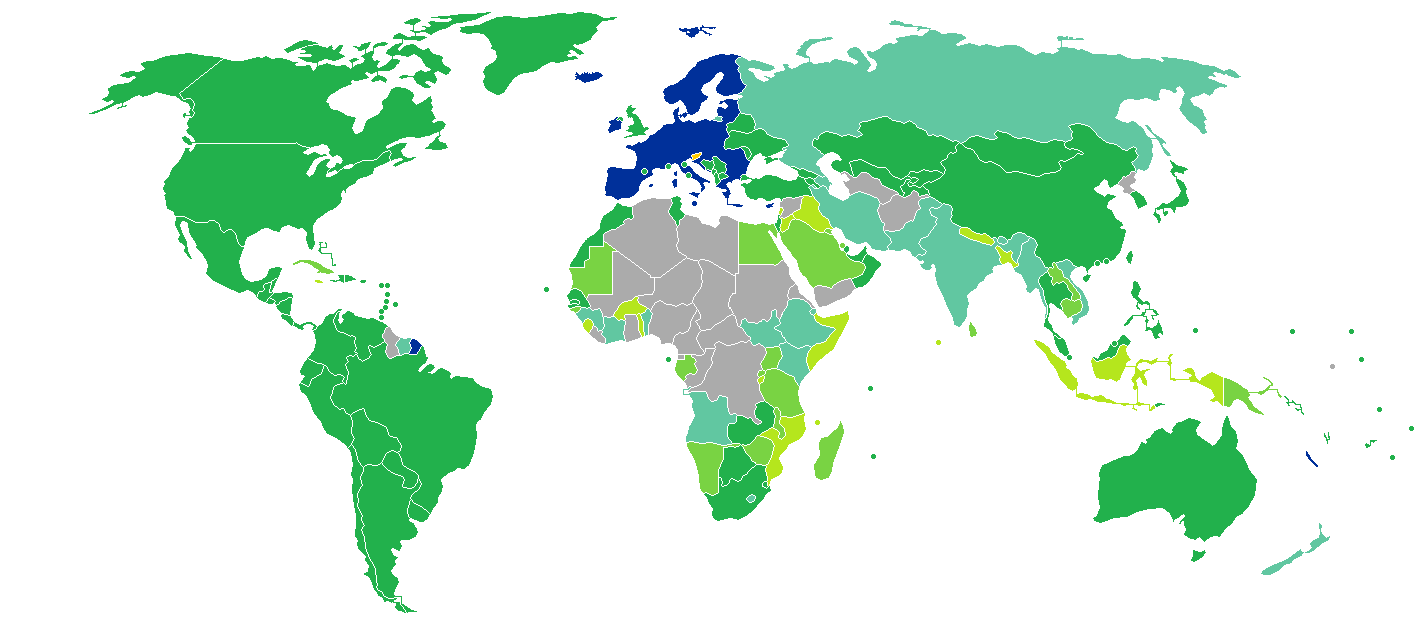
Visa requirements for Slovenian citizens

Visa requirements for Slovenian citizens are administrative entry restrictions by the authorities of other states placed on citizens of Slovenia. As of January 2024, Slovenian citizens had visa-free or visa-on-arrival access to 172 countries and territories, ranking the Slovenian passport 7th in the world according to Passport Index.

In 2017, the Slovenian nationality is ranked seventeenth in Nationality Index (QNI). This index differs from the Visa Restrictions Index, which focuses on external factors including travel freedom. The QNI considers, in addition, to travel freedom on internal factors such as peace & stability, economic strength, and human development as well.

== See also ==
- Izbrisani
