= Valdoltra Orthopedic Hospital =

Geography
- Location: Ankaran, Slovenia
- Coordinates: 45°34′51″N 13°43′38″E

Organisation
- Type: Specialist

Services
- Speciality: Orthopedics

History
- Opened: 1909

The Valdoltra Orthopedic Hospital (Slovene: Ortopedska bolnišnica Valdoltra) is one of Slovenia's most important treatment facilities. It is located in Ankaran on the coast of the Adriatic Sea in southwestern Slovenia. Its beginnings go back to 1909, when it began receiving patients with skeletal tuberculosis.
