= Timeline of Maribor =

The following is a timeline of the history of the city of Maribor, Slovenia.

== Prior to 19th century ==
- 1164 – First mention of Maribor as a castle on Pyramid Hill.
- 1204 – Maribor mentioned as a square.
- 1248 – First mention of the Maribor Cathedral.
- 1254 – Maribor mentioned as a town.
- 1478 – A second castle is built in the northeastern corner of town.
- 1515 – Maribor Town Hall is built.
- 1532 – The Siege of Maribor.
- 1752 – Maribor becomes the seat of the county.
- 1758 – The first gymnasium is established.
- 1795 – The first printing house is established.

== 19th century ==
- 1846 – The Southern Railway is constructed through the town.
- 1859 – Bishop Anton Martin Slomšek transfers the seat of the Diocese of Lavant to Maribor.
- 1863 – Maribor is connected with Carinthia, with the construction of the Carinthian Railway.
- 1868 – The first daily Slovenian newspaper, called Slovenski narod is established.
- 1883 – The first electric light in Slovene ethnic territory is installed on Castle Square.
- 1899 – Maribor National Hall is built.

== 20th century ==
- 1913 – The Old Bridge is built.
- 1918 – Rudolf Maister secures the city for the State of Slovenes, Croats and Serbs.
- 1919 – I. SSK Maribor is established.

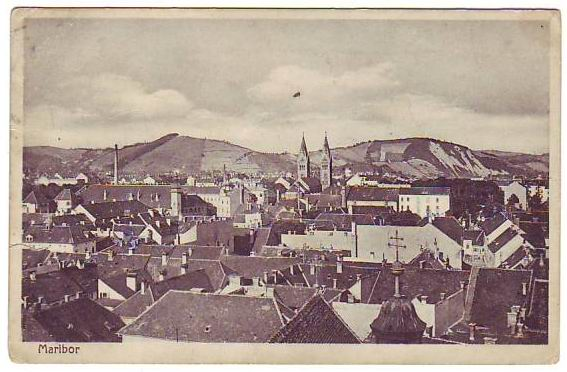
1929 postcard of Maribor

- 1922 – Maribor becomes the seat of the Maribor Oblast.
- 1927 – Letalski center Maribor founded.
- 1941
  - Nazi Germany occupies Maribor.
  - First action against the occupier in Maribor and Slovenia.
  - Stalag XVIII-D prisoner-of-war camp for Allied POWs established by the Germans.
  - Forced labour camp established by the Germans.
- 1941–1945 – Maribor prison massacres.
- 1942
  - August: Subcamp of the Stalag XVIII-B POW camp for Allied POWs established by the Germans.
  - November: Subcamp of the Stalag XVIII-B POW camp dissolved.
- 1945 – Maribor liberated.
- 1960 – NK Maribor is established.
- 1962 – Roman Catholic Diocese of Maribor established.
- 1964 – First Women FIS Alpine Ski World Cup held on Pohorje.
- 1975 – University of Maribor established.
- 1991
  - First clash between the Yugoslav People's Army and the Slovenian Territorial Defence occurs in Pekre and Maribor.
  - Maribor becomes part of independent Slovenia.
- 1997 – NK Maribor wins its first Slovenian football championship.

== 21st century ==
- 2002 – Maribor hosts the 2002 European Judo Championships.
- 2004 – Slovenia becomes part of the European Union.
- 2006 – Diocese of Maribor promoted to Archdiocese.
- 2007 – Maribor University Medical Centre opened.
- 2009 – Maribor hosts the 2009 World Shotgun Championships.
- 2012
  - The 2012-2013 Maribor protests begin, which spread into the 2012-2013 Slovenian protests.
  - Maribor becomes the European Capital of Culture.
- 2013 – Maribor becomes the European Youth Capital.
- 2015 – Maribor hosts the 2015 European Shooting Championships.

== See also ==
- Maribor history
- Timeline of Slovenian history
