= 2012 in Slovenia =

- Decades: 1990s; 2000s; 2010s; 2020s
- See also: Other events of 2012; Timeline of Slovenian history

The following is a list of events of the year 2012 in Slovenia.

== Incumbents ==
- President: Danilo Türk (until 22 December); then Borut Pahor
- Prime Minister: Borut Pahor (until 10 February); Janez Janša

== Events ==
Protesters in front of Maribor's Municipal building on 3 December 2012

- 10 February – Janez Janša takes over as prime minister
- 11 November – Slovenian presidential election, 2012
- 2 December – Borut Pahor wins the Slovenian presidential election runoff
- 22 December – Borut Pahor takes over as President

=== 2012–13 Slovenian protests ===
- 2012–13 Maribor protests

== Deaths ==
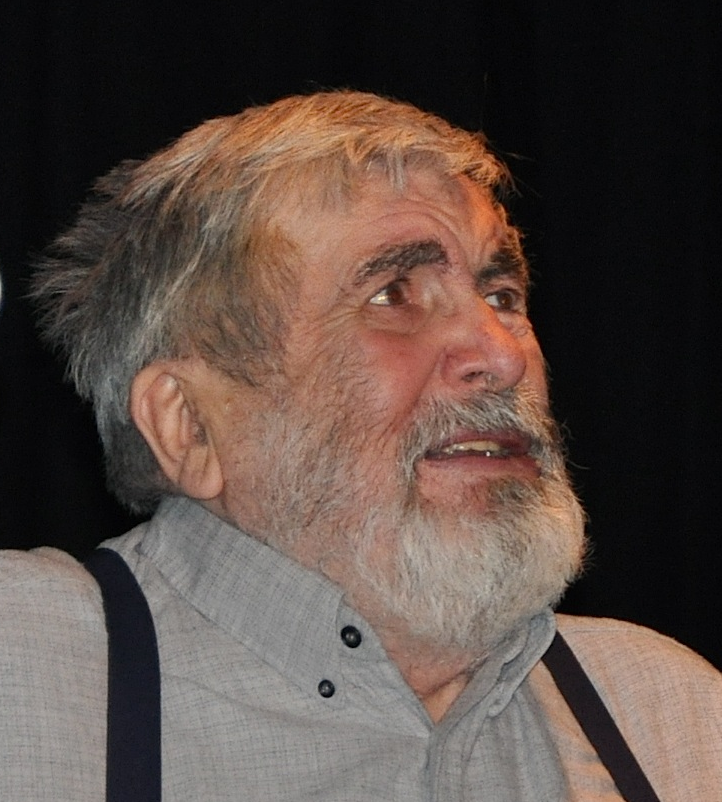
Polde Bibič

- 16 February – Mitja Brodar, archaeologist (b. 1921)
- 13 July – Polde Bibič, actor, writer and academic (b. 1933)
- 11 November – Tomaž Ertl, politician (b. 1932)
- 17 November – Branko Elsner, footballer (b. 1929)
