= 2015 in Slovenia =

- Decades: 1990s; 2000s; 2010s; 2020s
- See also: Other events of 2015; Timeline of Slovenian history

The following is a list of events of the year 2015 in Slovenia.

== Incumbents ==
- President: Borut Pahor
- Prime Minister: Miro Cerar

== Events ==
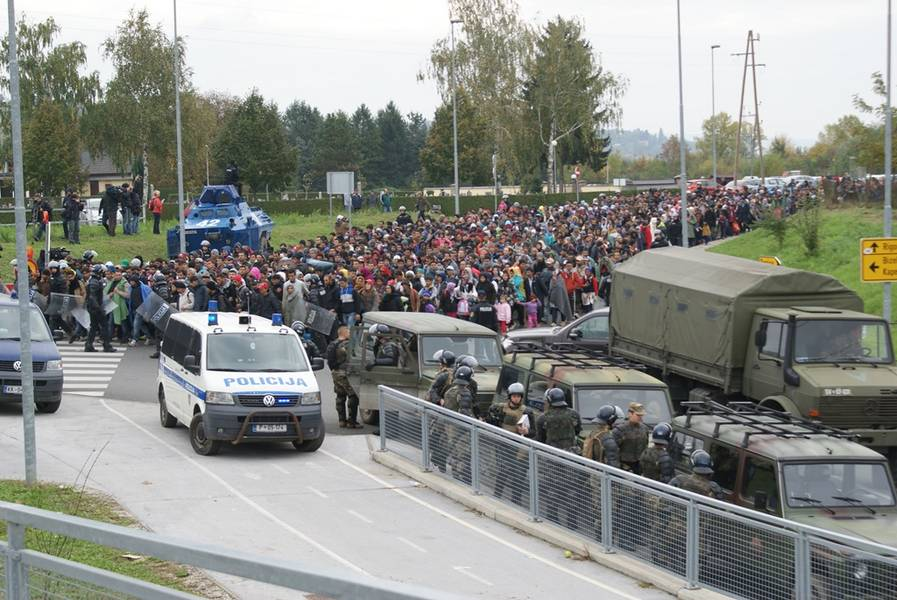
Border crisis situation in October 2015

- 13 January – Construction of the Vinarium Tower commenced
- 26 September-2 October – ISCM World Music Days, 2015
- November – Construction of a border barrier was initiated in response to the European migrant crisis
- 20 December – 2015 Slovenian same-sex marriage referendum

== Deaths ==
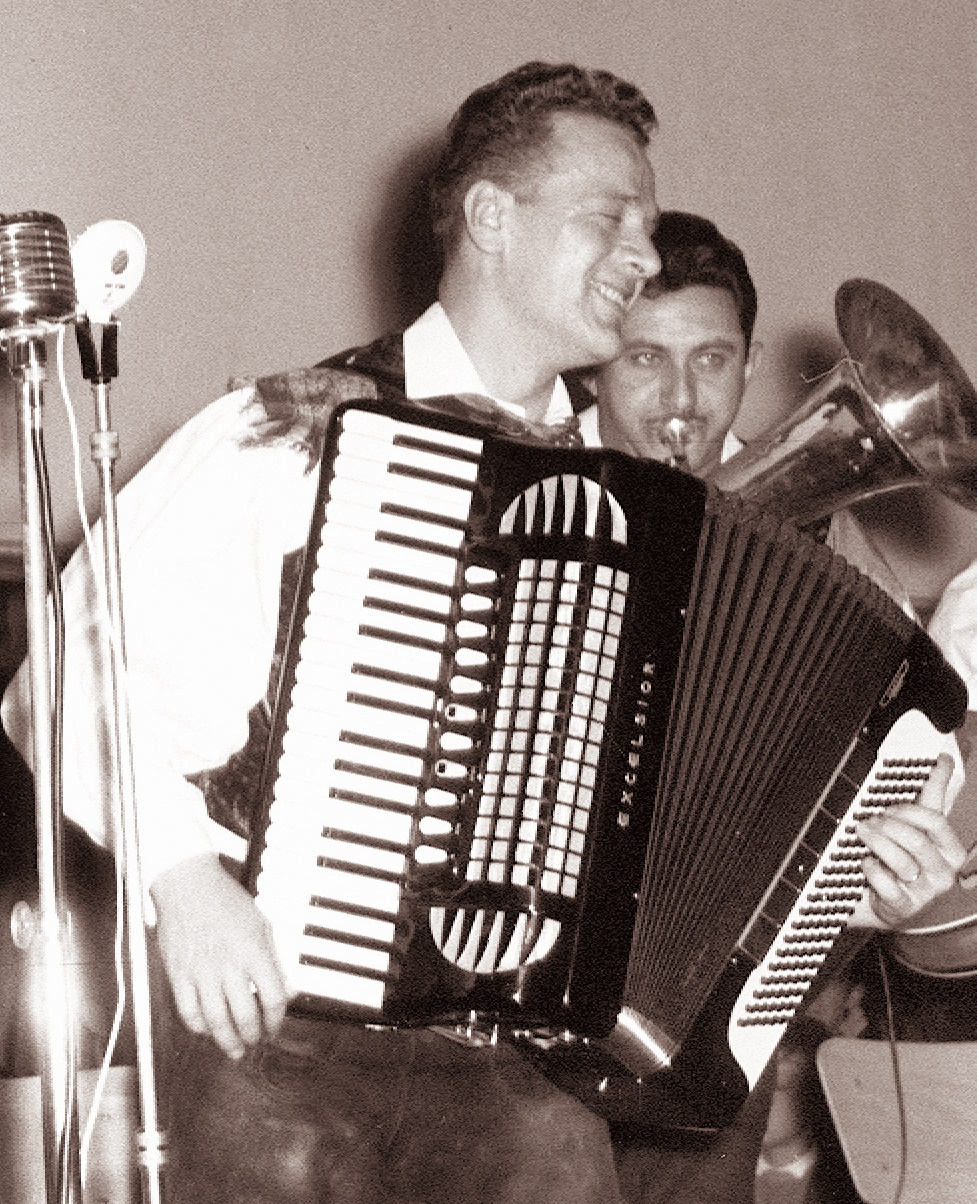
Slavko Avsenik in 1963

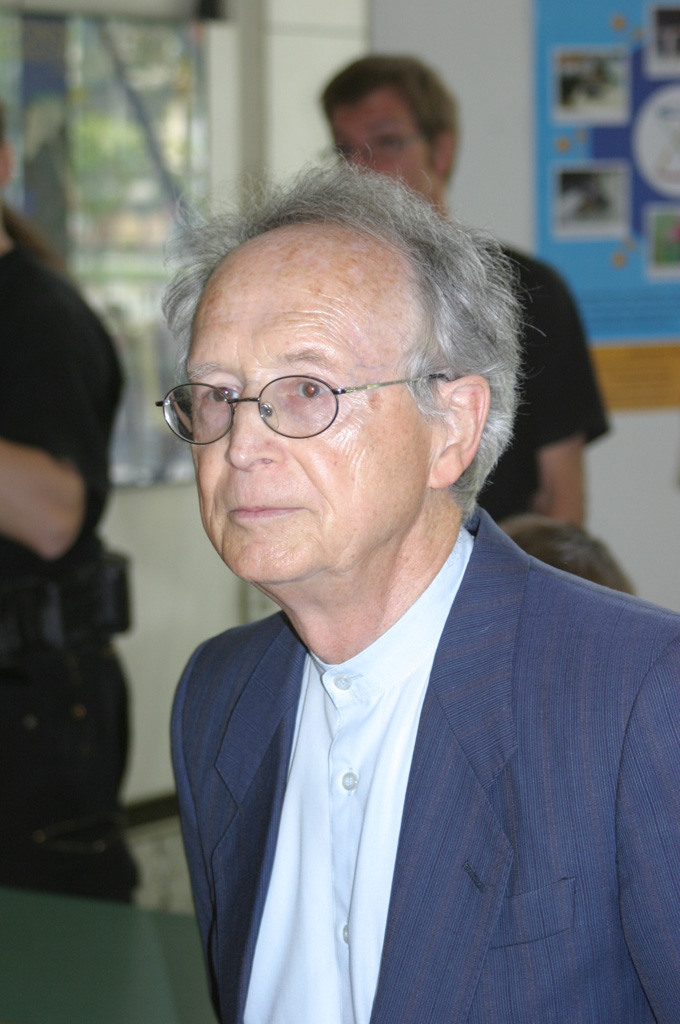
Janez Strnad

- 8 May – Adriana Maraž, graphic artist (b. 1935).
- 2 July – Slavko Avsenik, musician and composer (b. 1929)
- 11 July – Bojan Udovič, cyclist (b. 1957).
- 28 November – Janez Strnad, physicist (b. 1934)
