= Siege of Maribor =

The siege of Maribor may refer to:

- Siege of Maribor (1481), by the forces of the Kingdom of Hungary, led by their King Matthias Corvinus
- Siege of Maribor (1532), by the forces of the Ottoman Empire, led by their Sultan Suleiman the Magnificent
- Siege of Maribor (1683), by the forces of the Ottoman Empire
