= 2008 in Slovenia =

- Decades: 1980s; 1990s; 2000s; 2010s; 2020s
- See also: Other events of 2008; Timeline of Slovenian history

The following is a list of events of the year 2008 in Slovenia.

== Incumbents ==
- President: Danilo Türk
- Prime Minister: Janez Janša to November, 2008; then Borut Pahor

== Events ==
- September 21 - 2008 Slovenian parliamentary election

=== Date unknown ===
- Epeka, a Slovenian association is founded.

== Deaths ==
- February 23 - Janez Drnovšek, 57, Slovenian Prime Minister (1992–2002) and President (2002–2007), cancer.
- March 26 - Alojz Geržinič, composer (b. 1915)
- June 5 - Misha Lajovic, 86, Slovenian-born Australian politician, Senator for New South Wales (1975–1985).
- June 11 - Taras Kermauner, 78, Slovenian literary historian, philosopher and playwright.
- August 25 - Pavle Kozjek, 49, Slovenian mountaineer, climbing accident.
- December 16 - Zlatko Šugman, 76, Slovenian actor, illness.
- December 20 - Albin Planinc, 64, Slovenian chess grandmaster, after long illness.

== Arts and entertainment ==
In music: Slovenia in the Eurovision Song Contest 2008.
