= Center District =

Center District may refer to the following Slovenian districts:

- Center District, Ljubljana
- Center District, Maribor

== See also ==
- Central District (disambiguation)
