= Center District, Maribor =

Coordinates: 46°33′30″N 15°39′05″E

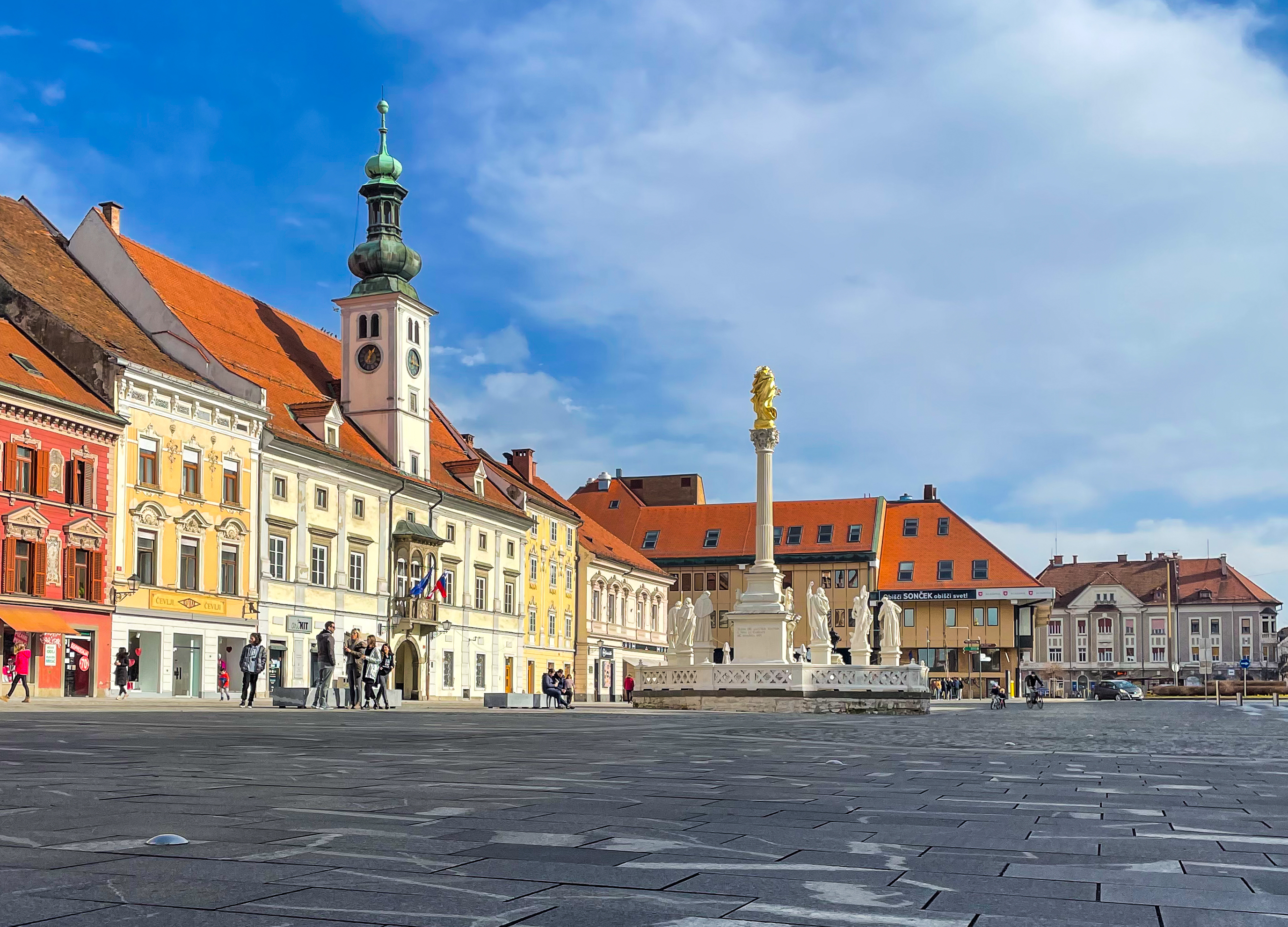
Main square with Maribor Town Hall

The Center District (pronounced [ˈtseːntəɾ]; Slovene: Mestna četrt Center) is the central district of the City Municipality of Maribor in northeastern Slovenia. It comprises the inner city area of the city of Maribor, including Main Square, the commercial streets, and Maribor Town Hall. In 2014, the district had a population of 6,975.
