= Trans-Universal Zombie Church of the Blissful Ringing =

The Trans-Universal Zombie Church of the Blissful Ringing (Slovene: Čezvesoljska Zombi Cerkev blaženega zvonjenja) is a contemporary religion in Slovenia, founded in March 2013 and registered in the national registry of religious communities in 2014. As of late 2014, the church had over 10,000 members, making it the fifth largest religion in Slovenia.

== Origins ==
The religion's origins are tied to the 2012–13 Slovenian protests where thousands of people protested against members of the Slovenian political elite, including the mayor of Maribor Franc Kangler, the Prime Minister of Slovenia Janez Janša, the opposition leader and mayor of Ljubljana Zoran Jankovič, and corruption in politics in general. The church originally formed as The Church of the Blissful Ringing and later added "Zombie" and "Trans-Universal" to the name, the former because of the ruling Slovenian Democratic Party labelling the protesters as zombies during the people's uprising. The official name was chosen using a Facebook poll and the church uses this social network for various activities. In 2014, the church was registered in the national registry of religious communities, which, as of 2016, contains 48 churches and other religious communities. The church also started gaining members in the neighbouring Croatia. With more than 10,000 members, the church is the fifth largest religion in Slovenia, after the Roman Catholic Church, Sunni Islam, Serbian Orthodox Church, and the Lutheran Church.

== Beliefs and activities ==
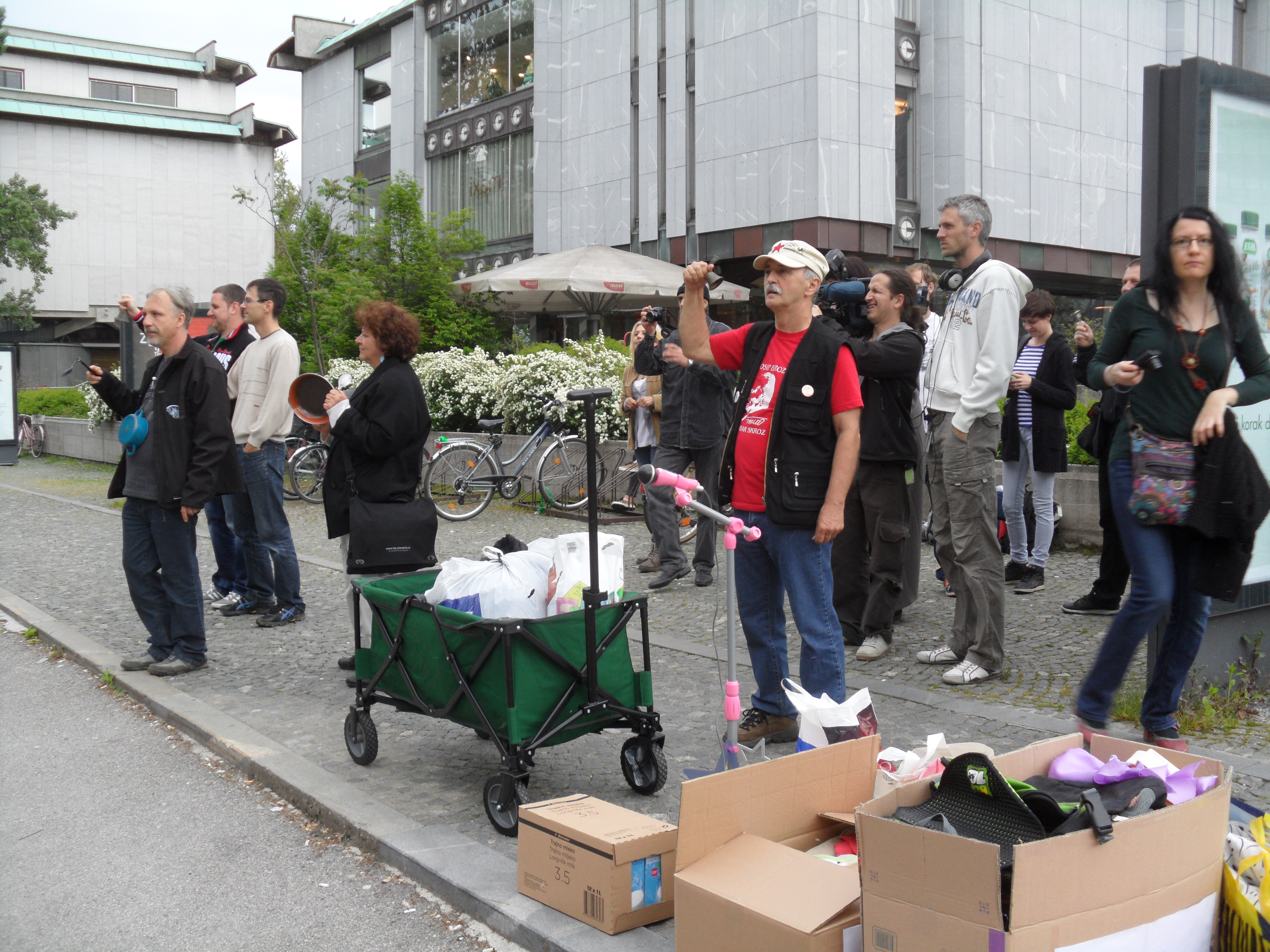
Holy mass of the church in front of the National Assembly building

According to the members of the church, the theology and the rituals are not strictly defined. The members should believe in the "Bell" and that the Universe begun with a "Big Bong", which took place before the Big Bang. Among other things, the church requires members to have sex once per week, and forbids sexual assault and planting of genetically modified crops. Initially, the holy drinks of the church were beer, piña colada, and water, but this was later extended to include all drinks that members enjoy. The church states that it allows its members to adhere to some other religion as well but requires all members to be at least 15 years old. The church plans to officiate weddings, including same-sex marriages.

Every Wednesday, the members of the church gather around the "Temple of Corruption" (the National Assembly Building of Slovenia) for holy mass. During the mass, they use pots, pans, and bells to produce clanking sounds. In addition, the members are active in various charity activities, such as helping people without health insurance, homeless, single mothers, and in 2016 also Syrian refugees.

The Church published its holy book in October 2014, with this being a compendium of articles, dogmas, gospels, revelations and other truths that form the basis for the theological contemplation of its followers. For example:

Every zombie in the Trans-universal Zombie Church of Blissful Ringing numbers the years of our calendar based on the great uprising which occurred in the year 0. The year 2013 is therefore year 1 of the zombie calendar. Every zombie gets up every day, which counts as resurrection. On average this occurs at 8am. Every holy inscription in holy books has to cite the date, year and the resurrection time precisely, which is going to be important information for millennia to come. Praise Bell. Bong.

== Public perception ==
The Trans-Universal Zombie Church of the Blissful Ringing received a mixed reception upon formation. It has been labelled as a parody religion by sociologist Marjan Smrke, who compared it to the Church of the Flying Spaghetti Monster and Jediism. He considered the role of the church positive since it acts a reflection of the problems facing the Roman Catholic Church in Slovenia. The registration of the church drew criticism from a Catholic association Zavod za družino in kulturo življenja KUL, as being an insult to the Catholic community in Slovenia. The Archbishop of Ljubljana, Stanislav Zore, stated that the registration of religious communities falls within the responsibility of the government which has to outline clear criteria to see what constitutes a religious community. Critics mentioned that a motivation for the formation of the church included avoiding the upcoming real estate tax, from which certain religious objects are exempt. On the other hand, Ales Crnic, a cultural studies professor at Ljubljana University, stated that "[The church] is a criticism of the modern state that has been failing to fulfil its social commitments."
