= 2013 in Slovenia =

- Decades: 1990s; 2000s; 2010s; 2020s
- See also: Other events of 2013; Timeline of Slovenian history

The following is a list of events of the year 2013 in Slovenia.

== Incumbents ==
- President: Borut Pahor
- Prime Minister: Janez Janša (until 20 March); Alenka Bratušek (from 20 March)

== Events ==
- Ongoing: 2012–2013 Slovenian protests

=== Sport ===
- 20–30 June – Slovenia at the 2013 Mediterranean Games
- 1–7 July – The tennis tournament 2013 Tilia Slovenia Open
- 4–22 September – Slovenia hosted the EuroBasket 2013
- Football: 2013 Slovenian Supercup
- 2013–14 Slovenian Football Cup
- Football: 2013–14 Slovenian PrvaLiga
- 2013–14 Slovenian Hockey League season
- 2013–14 Slovenian Basketball League

== Deaths ==
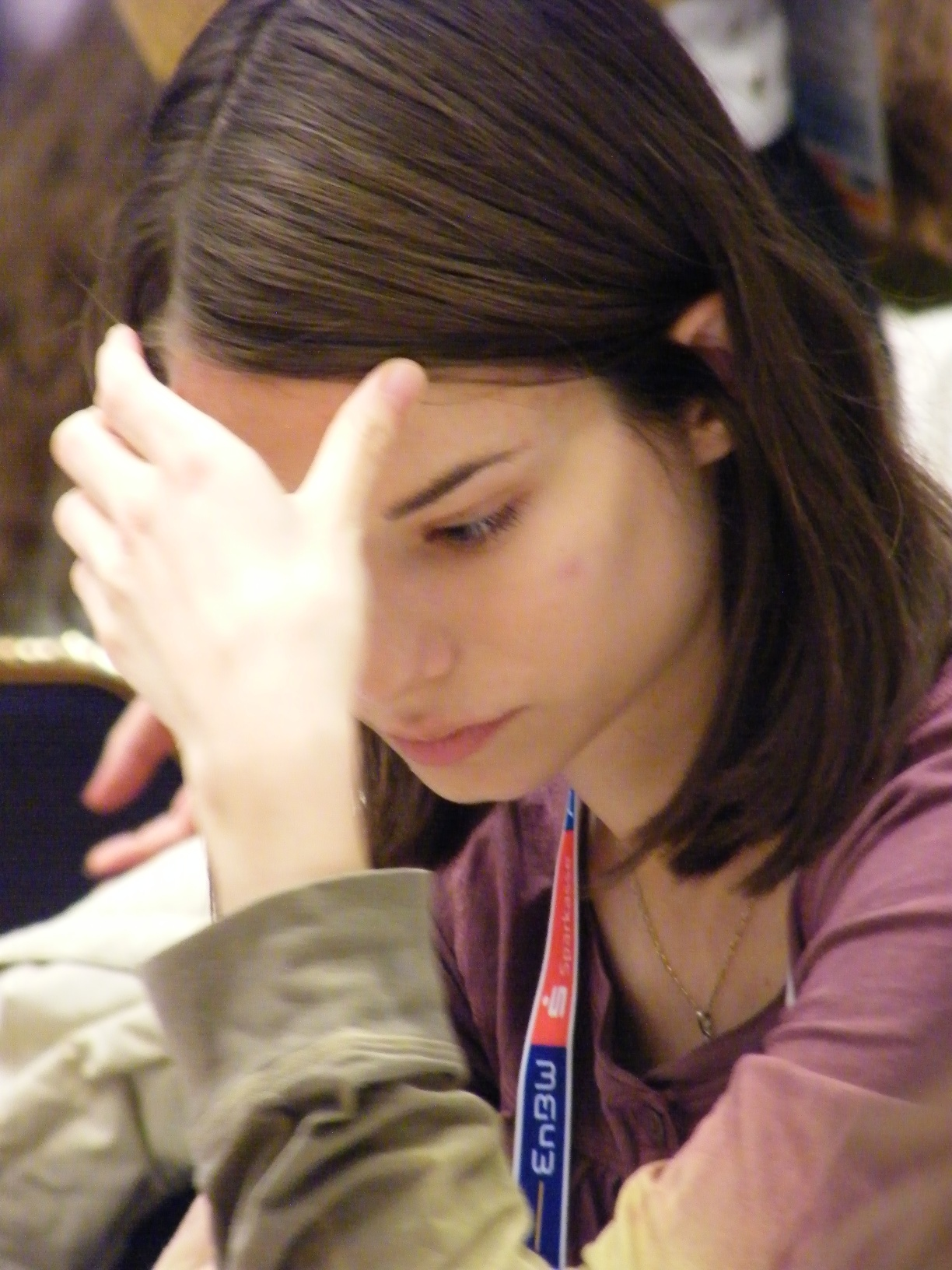
Vesna Rožič

- 7 January – Maruša Krese, poet, writer and journalist (born 1947).
- 3 February – Matija Duh, motorcycle speedway rider (born 1989).
- 1 March – Janez Albreht, actor (born 1925).
- 28 March – Boris Strel, alpine skier (born 1959).
- 14 April – Stanko Topolčnik, judoka (born 1947).
- 2 July – Roman Bengez, footballer (born 1964).
- 23 August – Vesna Rožič, chess player (born 1987).
- 25 August – Ciril Bergles, poet, essayist and translator (born 1934).
- 25 August – Rajko Pavlovec, geologist (born 1932)
- 19 September – Viktor Tišler, ice hockey player (born 1941).
- 28 November – Mitja Ribičič, politician (born 1919)
