= 2012–2013 Maribor protests =

Anti-government protests in Maribor, Slovenia

- Part of 2012–2013 Slovenian protests
- Protesters in front of Maribor's Municipal building on 3 December 2012
- Date: 2 November 2012 – 4 February 2013
- Location: Maribor, Slovenia
- Caused by: Political corruption; Favouritism, Nepotism and Clientelism
- Goals: Resignation of mayor Franc Kangler and end of corruption and clientelism in the City Municipality of Maribor; Abolition of the immunity from prosecution for members of the National Assembly and the National Council; Spread of the protests throughout Slovenia; resignations and prosecutions of politicians and other members of elite, accused of corruption
- Methods: Civil resistance; Demonstrations; Online activism; Police brutality^{[P–1]}; Riots; Vandalism^{[V–1]}
- Result: Franc Kangler's membership in the Slovenian People's Party revoked; Demands for resignation of mayors in Trebnje and Novo mesto; Kangler announces he will not run for a third mayoral term; The Democratic Party of Pensioners of Slovenia exits the ruling coalition in the city council; Srečko Zorko, the ranking Slovenian People's Party city councillor resigns his position; Kangler announces his resignation as Mayor of Maribor; Kanglers' mandate to become a member of the National Council is rejected by a vote of 19 to 18; Protests across Slovenia

Casualties
- Injuries: 65
- Arrested: 150; See: casualties section below.

The 2012–2013 Maribor protests are part of the 2012–2013 Slovenian protests against the Slovenian political elite members, including the mayor Franc Kangler, the right-wing government leader Janez Janša, and the opposition leader Zoran Janković. In 2013 all three were officially accused of corruption by the Commission for the Prevention of Corruption of the Republic of Slovenia. The protests began on 2 November 2012 in the city of Maribor, Slovenia.

Despite being predominantly peaceful in nature, the protests have not been without violent clashes between security forces and protesters. In late November 2012, the protests spread to cities and towns throughout the country, where the people are demanding resignations and prosecutions of politicians and other members of the "elite", accused of corruption.

== Background ==
=== Political situation in Maribor ===
Franc Kangler became the mayor of Maribor after winning the elections in December 2006, and again in October 2010 when he was re-elected. He won his second mayoral term in the first round and secured a strong coalition in the City Council. During his six-year tenure he has become notorious after being involved in multiple affairs and scandals, resulting in a number of criminal investigations and indictments, none in which he has been found guilty to date. He has been frequently accused by both the media and his opposition of political corruption, favouritism, clientelism, misguided budgetary policy and failed or semi-finished projects, the biggest one being the unsuccessful organization of the 2013 Winter Universiade for which the City Municipality of Maribor now faces a multi-million euros lawsuit from the FISU. Kangler rejects the blame for the failed project and argues that his organizing committee has done everything in their power to host the event and that the blame lies on the shoulders of the Government and the "third-rate state bureaucrats". To date, the Commission for Prevention of Corruption in Slovenia has issued multiple opinions in which they labeled some of Kangler's actions as "corrupt". Because of his crude language and alleged eluding of the law, critics have dubbed Kangler the "Maribor sheriff".

Critics say that Kangler's downfall began in October 2012, when he signed a controversial public–private partnership with the company Iskra Sistemi for the implementation of a stationary radar system with the intended purpose of ensuring greater traffic safety within the city limits. Iskra Sistemi was granted permission to install 46 speed radars, 30 of which were operational by the end of October, and within the first few days the system detected almost 25,000 traffic offenses, the majority of which were minor. Kangler soon faced accusations about the financing of the project and alleged irregularities within the contract. In the initial plan the cost of the system was set at around five million euros, which then skyrocketed to 30 million. The fact that Iskra Sistemi receives 92% of all collected fines and the City Municipality receives only 8% was questioned by the Information Commissioner of Slovenia, who stated that she doubts that a private company would want to ensure greater road safety when their primary motive is making profit. When told in what percentage the money from traffic fines was divided, a representative of a Dutch company, which has manufactured the radars, expressed his surprise and said that the Maribor case is unusual for them, stating that their systems in Europe are always commissioned by either the state or by the provincional governments. Faced with pressure from the media and the people, Kangler then pardoned all drivers who had committed minor traffic offenses. The speed radar system was strongly opposed by the people of Maribor from the start and within the first weeks of their implementation 10 out of 30 operational speed radars were damaged or destroyed, with the total damage cost exceeding 300,000 euros.

=== Political situation in Slovenia ===
Government under the right-wing leader Janez Janša responded to the weakening of the Slovenian economy during the global economic crisis and European sovereign-debt crisis with opening up old ideological fronts against the liberal media and the public sector, especially the educational and cultural sectors, accusing them of being under the influence of members of the old regime called Udbomafia and "Uncles from Behind the Scenes" (In Slovene: "strici iz ozadja") and against anyone who doubted that the austerity measures that have been forced upon Slovenia are the right ones.

== Protests ==
=== Maribor ===
==== 21 November 2012 ("The first Maribor uprising") ====
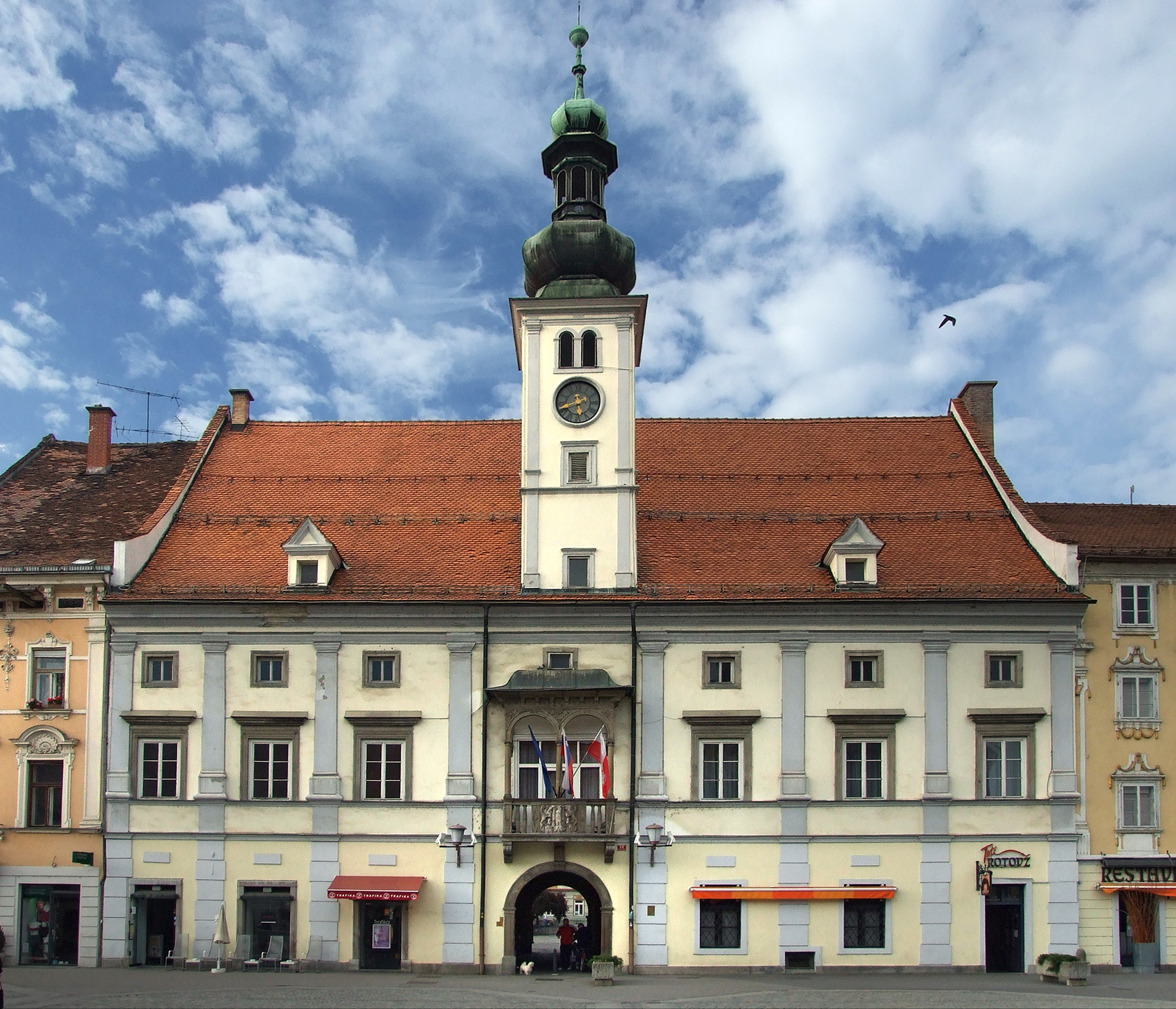
Maribor Town Hall

On 21 November 2012 election for the National Council was held in Maribor Town Hall, with Kangler being one of the candidates. It is speculated that the sole reason for Kangler's candidature for the council was that elected councillors receive immunity from prosecution during the duration of their five-year term. However, Kangler has denied these claims and stated, one day before the election, that he waives his immunity in case he gets elected. Most of the 38 electors were proposed and named by the City Municipality of Maribor and at around 18:15 CET they elected Kangler with a majority vote (25). Upon hearing the result, the crowd of about 1,000 non-violent protesters blocked the entrance to the Town Hall, preventing Kangler to leave. Kangler then phoned his friend and former kickboxing champion Tomaž Barada in order to escort him to safety. At around 20:00 CET, Barada, who is also a member of the Maribor City Council, appeared at the protest concealed with a hoodie and accompanied by about a dozen of masked friends. The group then unsuccessfully tried to force their way into the Town Hall only to be pushed back by the police, which was securing the entrance. Violence erupted, with two protesters and two members of the police reportedly suffering minor injuries. Escorted and under protection of the police, Franc Kangler then left the building and was driven to safety in a police van. It is speculated that the actions of Barada and the group of his friends were pre-organized in order to turn the protest into a violent one, which would give the police a legitimate reason to forcibly disperse the protesters and clear the way for Kangler's exit. Claims were later denied by Barada, who said that he only wanted to help his friend, the mayor. Several hours before the protest, a Facebook group, which calls Kangler to step down from office, posted a message on its wall, that they have received reliable anonymous tip that Kangler has enlisted a group of hooligans with the sole reason to turn the protest into a violent one, and urged protesters to be peaceful and to obey the instruction given by the police. During Franc Kangler's last mayoral term, Barada's school of martial arts BB Hwarang received over €150,000 of donations from the City Municipality of Maribor. After the protests, the Slovenian People's Party revoked Kangler's membership and excluded him from their political party. In a press conference one day later, Kangler regretted the decision of the party and stated that he has no intentions of stepping down from office.

==== 26 November 2012 ("The second Maribor uprising") ====
"Because the protesters did not disperse when ordered, we decided for the use of police force, only to encounter violent resistance from the majority of the people present. However, given the serious breach of public order, the use of tear gas was ordered and then the protesters scattered to smaller groups throughout Maribor, assaulting police officers in the process."

— Danijel Lorbek, Director of the Maribor Police Department.

"The protests are illegal, not registered and not allowed.. We will do everything in our power to hunt down and bring to justice the anonymous organizers of the protests, and held them accountable for the violence and damage caused by the rioters."

— Vinko Gorenak, Minister of the Interior.

"The protests in Maribor are legitimate and expected, given the behavior of the mayor Franc Kangler. I am worried about the use of excessive police force and official statements of Vinko Gorenak, Minister of the Interior."

— Danilo Türk, incumbent President of Slovenia, a native of Maribor.

"With three other friends we were sitting on the ground in a sign of a peaceful protest.. Then we have told the police officers not to behave in such an aggressive manner towards us, only to be sprayed in the eyes with tear gas and ordered to disperse. However, we could not comply as we were incapacitated and could not see. They have then started pounding on us with batons and draging us on the ground. Two officers were arresting the people, one was stepping on the heads of the "rioters" and the other was handcuffing their hands.. When I and my friend were seating in a police vehicle we insisted that the police can not treat peaceful protesters in such a manner. Then one of the officers approached us and started shouting towards us to be quiet. He was one of the more aggressive ones, in full combat gear, and reeked of alcohol. There is no doubt in my mind that he was intoxicated."

— Aljoša Planteu, coach of Filip Flisar, a renowned freestyle skier and Olympian.

The third protest occurred on 26 November 2012, starting at 16:30 CET, when about 10,000 people gathered on the Liberty square (Trg svobode). Demonstrations started peacefully, with protesters chanting slogans against Kangler and setting ablaze his pictures, a life-size model of the mayor and a cardboard model of one of the speed radars. However, about two hours into the protests they turned violent when a group of several thousand decided to move in front of a building, the seat of the City Municipality of Maribor, located about 200 meters to the north of the square, which was heavily protected by the police forces.

Reports on what triggered the violence vary, however, the area was quickly a scene of a massive riot with heavy clashes that erupted between hundreds of protesters and members of the police. Reporters present at the protests described the scenes that followed as "a war zone" and as unprecedented in the history of Slovenia, since its independence in 1991. The violence started at around 18:15 CET and escalated after the use of force and tear gas by the police, which scattered the crowd into a number of smaller groups and fighting continued for several hours on different locations within the city centre. Clashes occurred on most of Maribor's town squares, with particularly heavy fighting on Rudolf Maister square (Trg Generala Maistra), Castle square (Grajski trg) and the Main square (Glavni trg), the site of the protests on 21 November. The police used all means available to them using tear gas, police dogs and even mounted police, which was indiscriminately charging into the protesters and even the journalists. Overlooking the sky was a police helicopter, which helped throw tear gas into the streets. At around 22:00 CET the situation had stabilized and Maribor streets were left deserted.

The fighting led to several dozen arrests and injured people. In total 31 protesters were arrested and 22 people injured (11 protesters and 11 police officers). Everyone that sought and received medical treatment suffered minor injuries, however, two police officers and one protester had to spend a night in the hospital. In addition, there were also 14 police vehicles that were damaged during the riot.

At 22:15 CET a press conference was held by the Maribor Police Department and Vinko Gorenak, Minister of the Interior, who immediately went from Ljubljana to Maribor, driving when the fighting in the city streets was still occurring. The last time a Minister of the Interior had to intervene and come Maribor unexpectedly was after the assassination of Ivan Kramberger in 1992. At the press conference the Minister stated that although some claims and demands of the protesters seems legitimate, the protests itself are not. Gorenak dubbed the protests as "illegal, not registered and not allowed" and stated that the intervention of the police was correct and within the authorized limits. Gorenak also stated that the police will do everything in their power to hunt down the anonymous organizers of the protests, and held them accountable for the violence and damage caused by the rioters. He also called out on the media for reliable and objective reporting, pointing out the "inaccuracies of the emergency rooms being full of injured people". Gorenak's claims, that a protest has to be registered and officially announced to be legal, were later denied and dismissed as unfounded by Miro Cerar Jr., a professor of law at the University of Ljubljana. Danijel Lorbek, Director of the Maribor Police Department, stated that the police force and tear gas was used only after the violent protesters assaulted officers who were guarding the main building of the Municipality. He dismissed claims of excessive use of force as unfounded, stating that it was the protesters who violently opposed the orders given by the police.

Even during the protests reports were made, by the reporters covering the event live, that the police had exceeded their authority and used excessive force. The protest was non-violent and escalated only after the police threw tear gas into the peaceful crowd and decided to disperse the crowd by force. YouTube videos emerged, showing the excessive force used by the police officers. One of the videos even shows how peaceful sitting protesters are being sprayed with tear gas in order to forcibly disperse. Some reporters described the events as police brutality and unprecedented in the history of Slovenia, since its independence in 1991, stating how the police did not use such measures against its own people even during the period of socialist Yugoslavia.

==== 3 December 2012 ("The third Maribor uprising") ====
Protest in front of a Municipal building on 3 December 2012

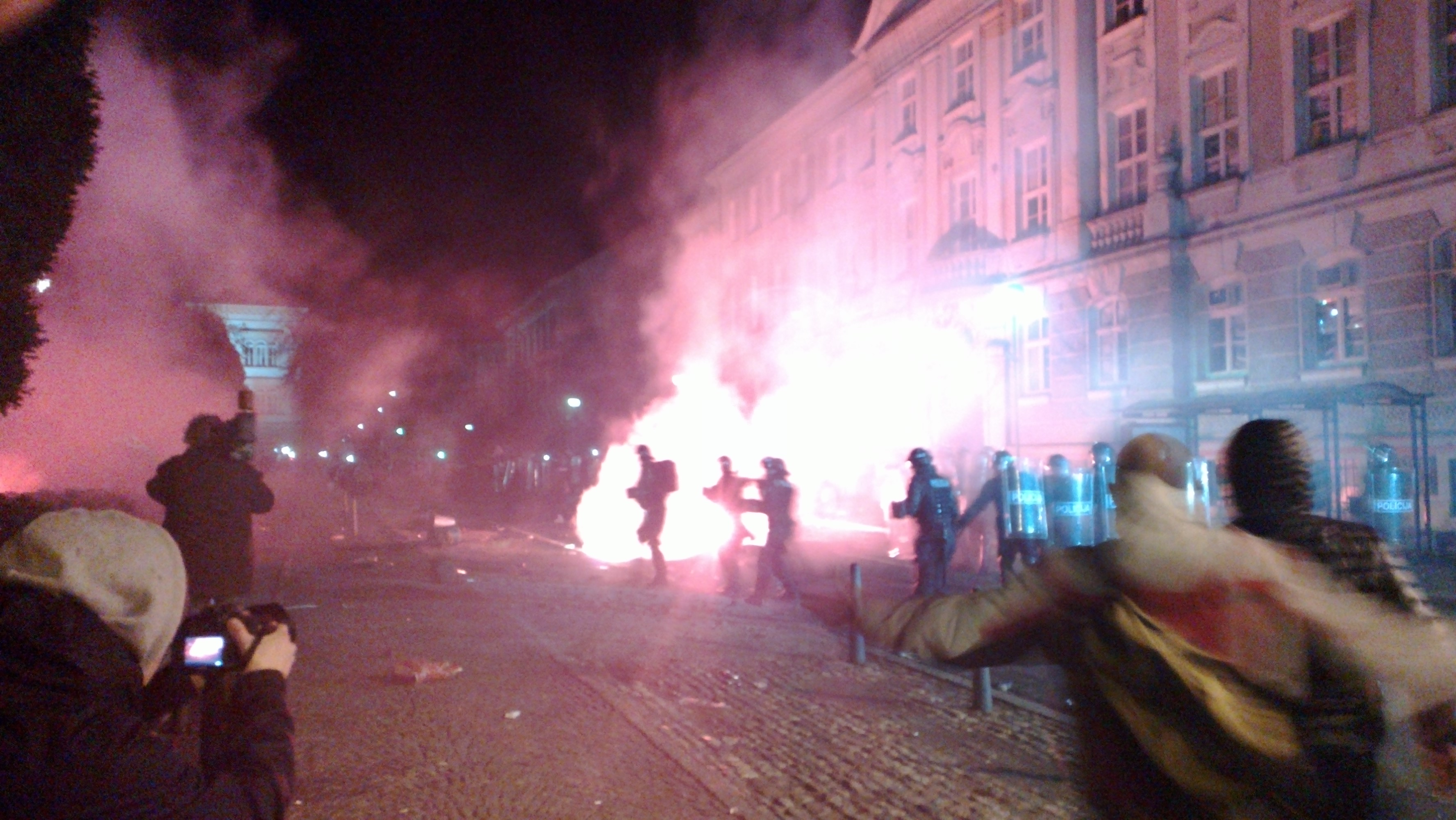
Protest on 3 December 2012

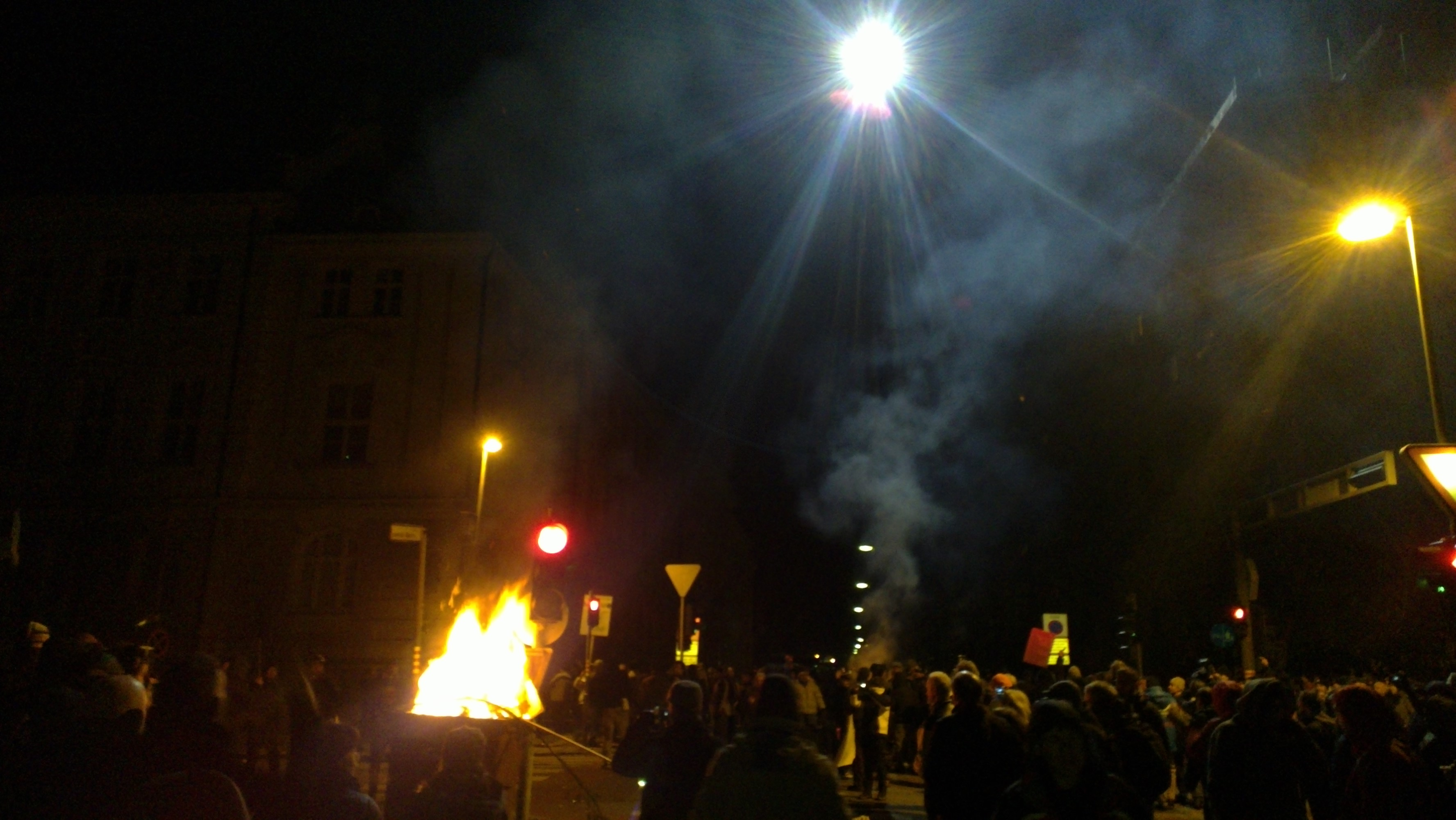
Protest on 3 December 2012

===== The protest =====
The largest protest thus far was on 3 December 2012 when about 20,000 people reportedly gathered in Maribor squares. Again starting at 16:30 CET the protest started peacefully and continued this way until the demonstrators moved from Liberty square to the nearby Rudolf Maister square and in front of the Municipal building. There the protesters where throwing rocks and pyrotechnics into the building. At about 19:00 CET the violence escalated after the use of force by the police officers who clashed with the protesters and arrested some of them. The police then secured the entrance to the building, however, they were soon pushed back after the protesters charged into them and returned to their previous position. Shortly thereafter, a police helicopter began overflying the area and soon found itself under fire by some of the protesters, who targeted it with rockets. Similar to the protest on 26 November, the fighting between the police and the protesters then spread across the city centre and continued for several hours, with tear gas circulating through the air after another extensive use. The gas was mixed with clouds of smoke from fires, alight by some of the protesters. A day after the protest Aleksander Ogrizek, President of the Union of Professional Firefighetrs, stated that the Maribor fire department had 25 interventions during four hours, some of which were life-threatening for the firefighters involved in putting out the fires. He has also stated that the scenes reminded him of Beirut.

The fighting has led to a total of 39 people who sought medical treatment; 14 protesters and 25 police officers. Most of the injuries sustained were minor, however, one protester suffered a broken jaw and was subjected to surgery. The violence has also led to 119 arrests.

=== Spread of protests across Slovenia ===
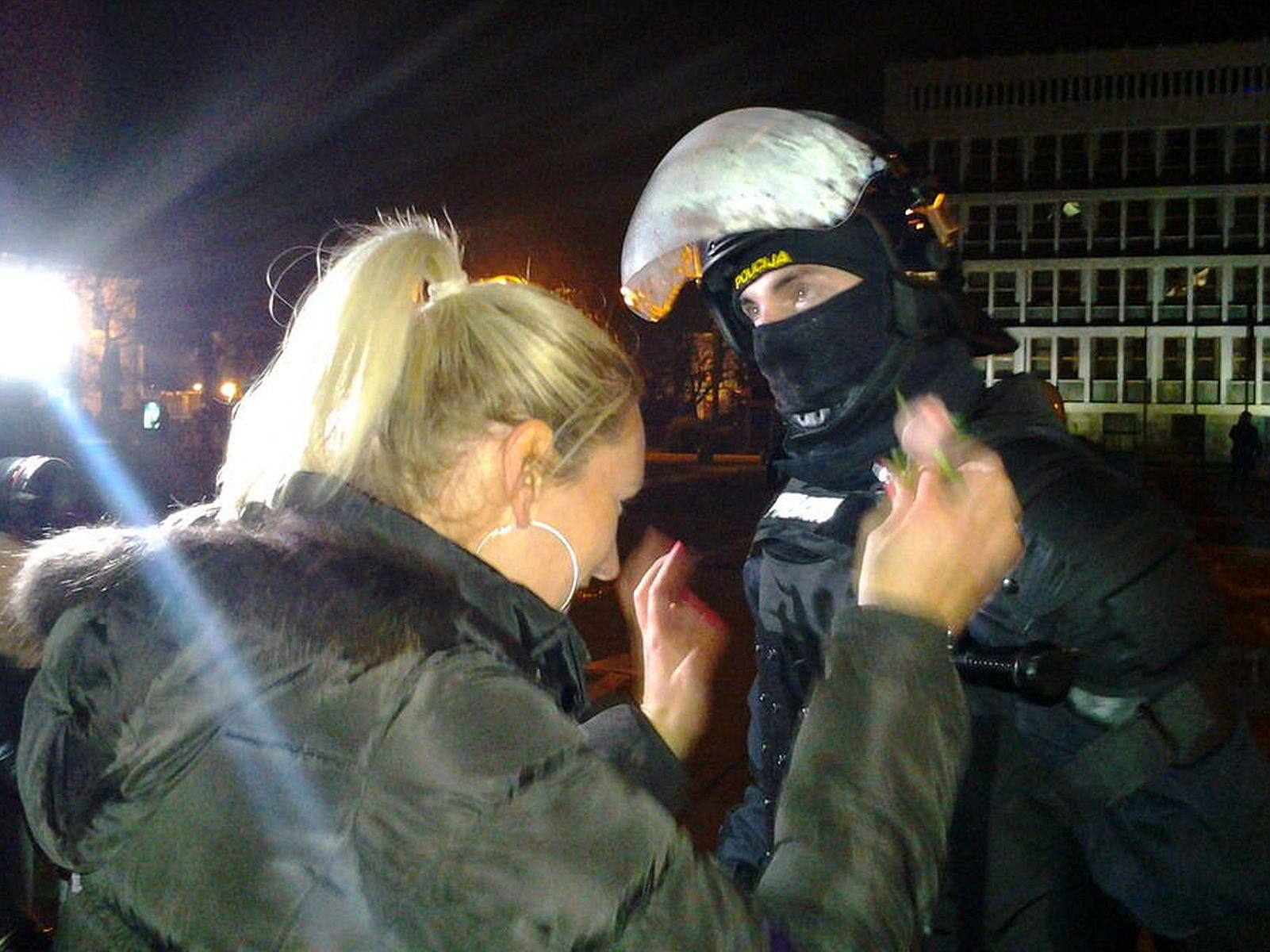
Young lady attaches a carnation on the policeman's uniform during one of the protests in Ljubljana.

== Casualties and arrests ==
=== Maribor ===
List of 2012 Maribor protests and official figures from the events
Date	Venue	Number of demonstrators^{1}	Arrests	Protesters	Police
Date	Venue	Number of demonstrators^{1}	Arrests	Injured^{2}	
2 November 2012	Seat of the Municipality	50	n/a	n/a	n/a
12 November 2012	Seat of the Municipality	400–600	n/a	n/a	n/a
21 November 2012	Maribor Town Hall	1,000	n/a	2	2
26 November 2012	Liberty square	10,000	31	11	11
3 December 2012	Liberty square	20,000	119	14	25
10 December 2012	Seat of Maribor's court and prison	100–200	n/a	n/a	n/a
14 December 2012	Liberty square	10,000	n/a	n/a	n/a

Notes

- Note 1: The number of protesters is approximate and provided by the state-owned RTV Slovenija.
- Note 2: The list includes only those who sought and received medical treatment.

=== Slovenia ===
List of 2012 and 2013 Slovenian protests and figures from the events
Date	Venue	Number of demonstrators^{1}	Arrests	Protesters	Police
Date	Venue	Number of demonstrators^{1}	Arrests	Injured^{2}	
27 November 2012	Ljubljana	1,000	n/a	1	n/a
28 November 2012	Jesenice	60	n/a	n/a	n/a
29 November 2012	Kranj	1,000	2	n/a	n/a
30 November 2012
30 November 2012	Ajdovščina	200	n/a	n/a	n/a
30 November 2012	Koper	250	n/a	n/a	n/a
30 November 2012	Ljubljana	10,000	30	11	15
30 November 2012	Nova Gorica	400–1,500	n/a	n/a	n/a
30 November 2012	Novo mesto	300	n/a	n/a	n/a
30 November 2012	Trbovlje	300	n/a	n/a	n/a
30 November 2012	Velenje	350	n/a	n/a	n/a
2 December 2012	Krško	200	n/a	n/a	n/a
3 December 2012
3 December 2012	Celje	2,500	15	n/a	n/a
3 December 2012	Ljubljana	4,000	n/a	n/a	n/a
3 December 2012	Ptuj	600	n/a	n/a	n/a
3 December 2012	Ravne na Koroškem	500	n/a	n/a	n/a
3 December 2012	Trbovlje	400	n/a	n/a	n/a
4 December 2012	Jesenice	400	11	n/a	n/a
6 December 2012
6 December 2012	Koper	400	15	n/a	n/a
6 December 2012	Kranj	500	n/a	n/a	n/a
7 December 2012
7 December 2012	Ajdovščina	200	n/a	n/a	n/a
7 December 2012	Bohinjska Bistrica	30	n/a	n/a	n/a
7 December 2012	Ljubljana	1,000–2,000	n/a	n/a	n/a
7 December 2012	Murska Sobota	2,000–2,500	n/a	n/a	n/a
8 December 2012	Nova Gorica	300	n/a	n/a	n/a
9 December 2012	Brežice	100–200	n/a	n/a	n/a
10 December 2012
10 December 2012	Ljubljana	100	n/a	n/a	n/a
10 December 2012	Ptuj	100	n/a	n/a	n/a
12 December 2012
12 December 2012	Celje	200	n/a	n/a	n/a
12 December 2012	Koper	100	n/a	n/a	n/a
13 December 2012
13 December 2012	Jesenice	30	n/a	n/a	n/a
13 December 2012	Ljubljana	40	n/a	n/a	n/a
14 December 2012
14 December 2012	Ajdovščina	30	n/a	n/a	n/a
14 December 2012	Kranj	50	n/a	n/a	n/a
14 December 2012	Lendava	50	n/a	n/a	n/a
14 December 2012	Litija	10	n/a	n/a	n/a
14 December 2012	Murska Sobota	250	n/a	n/a	n/a
14 December 2012	Trebnje	100	n/a	n/a	n/a
11 January 2013	Ljubljana	8000+	2	n/a	n/a
8 February 2013	Ljubljana	20,000+	5	n/a	n/a
9 March 2013	Ljubljana	5,000+	4	n/a	n/a

Notes

- Note 1: The number of protesters is approximate and provided by the state-owned RTV Slovenija and Delo, the largest national daily newspaper in the country.
- Note 2: The list includes only those who sought and received medical treatment.

== Footnotes ==
- ^{P–1} After the events on 26 November, the Director of the Maribor Police Department officially denied claims of excessive use of police force and stated that the police acted after they were attacked by the protesters. However, YouTube videos emerged, which shows how violent opposition of the people only began after the police decided to throw tear gas into the crowd and forcibly disperse the protest. One of the videos even shows how peaceful sitting protesters are being sprayed with tear gas.
- ^{V–1} For the most part vandalism was restricted towards the destruction of the traffic radars. However, some Municipal buildings also suffered damage during the riots.
