= 2011 in Slovenia =

- Decades: 1990s; 2000s; 2010s; 2020s
- See also: Other events of 2011; Timeline of Slovenian history

The following is a list of events of the year 2011 in Slovenia.

== Incumbents ==
- President: Danilo Türk
- Prime Minister: Borut Pahor

== Arts and entertainment ==
In music: Slovenia in the Eurovision Song Contest 2011.

== Sports ==
Football (soccer) competitions: Slovenian PrvaLiga, Slovenian Second League, Slovenian Third League, Slovenian Cup.
