= 2014 in Slovenia =

- Decades: 1990s; 2000s; 2010s; 2020s
- See also: Other events of 2014; Timeline of Slovenian history

The following is a list of events of the year 2014 in Slovenia.

== Incumbents ==
- President: Borut Pahor
- Prime Minister: Alenka Bratušek (until 18 September), Miro Cerar (starting 18 September)

== Events ==
=== May ===
- 5 May - Slovenian Prime Minister Alenka Bratušek resigns after losing the leadership of her party 10 days earlier.

=== June ===
- 1 June – Slovenian President Borut Pahor dissolves parliament and schedules an early election for 13 July.

=== July ===
- 13 July - The parliamentary election in Slovenia is held.

=== September ===
- 18 September - Miro Cerar is sworn in as Prime Minister of Slovenia.
