= Main Square (Maribor) =

Square in Maribor, Slovenia

Coordinates: 46°33′26.98″N 15°38′43.29″E

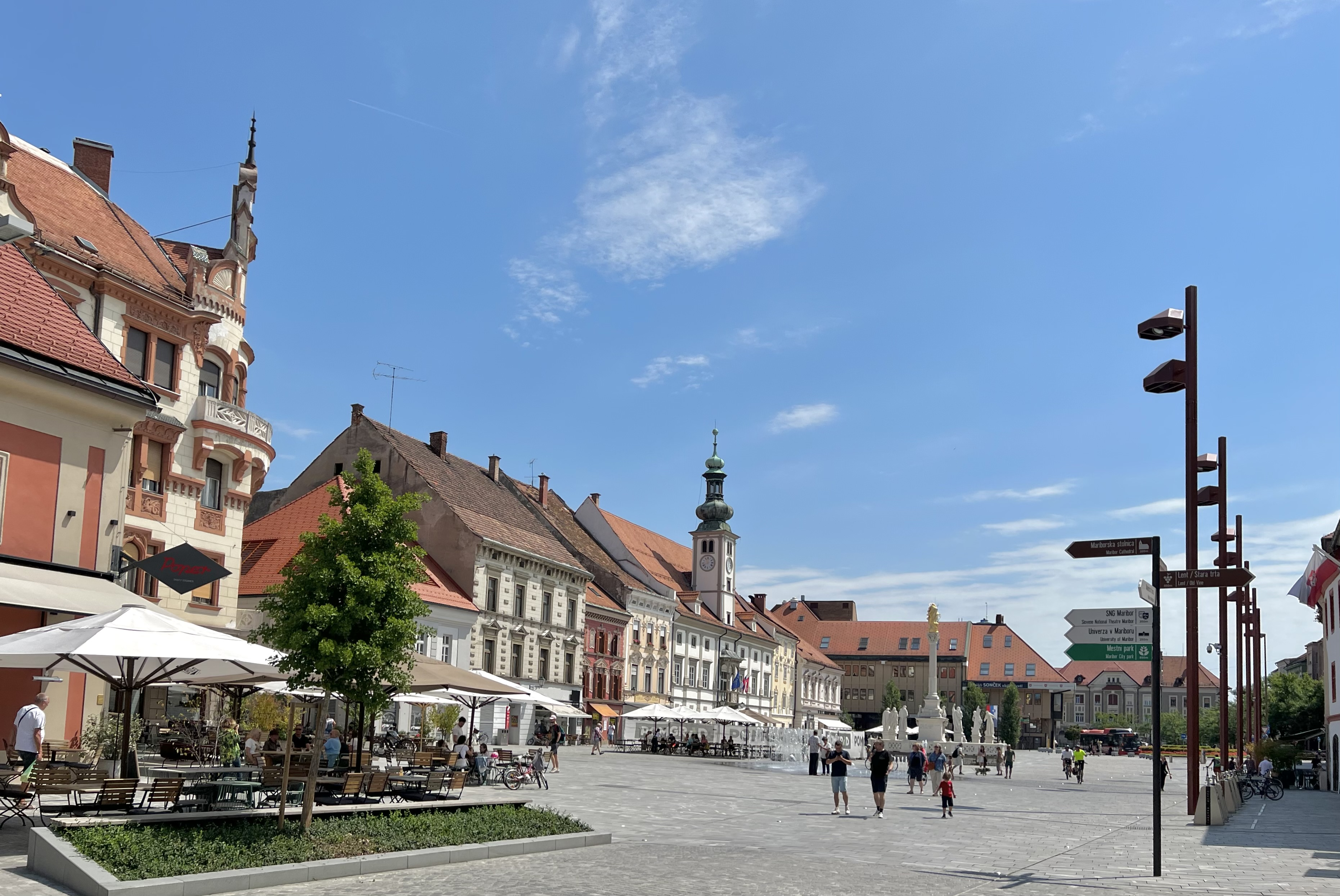
Main Square with Town Hall and the Plague Column

The Main Square of Maribor, also known as Glavni trg, is a square in Maribor, the second largest city in Slovenia, situated in the northeast of the country. On 17 November 1929 the aircraft: Raab-Katzenstein KL.1 Schwalbe with registration: D-974 crashed on Main Square of Maribor, with the death of Letalski center Maribor secretary: Ivo Šestan and the factory pilot Hans Müller. It used to be home to Maribor Slovenia's merchants' and on the upper side of the square is home to an open market.

== Notable buildings ==
- Maribor Town Hall - Renaissance architecture -built in 1515.
- Plague Memorial
