= Maribor Castle =

Castle in Slovenia

Coordinates: 46°33′39.36″N 15°38′55.88″E

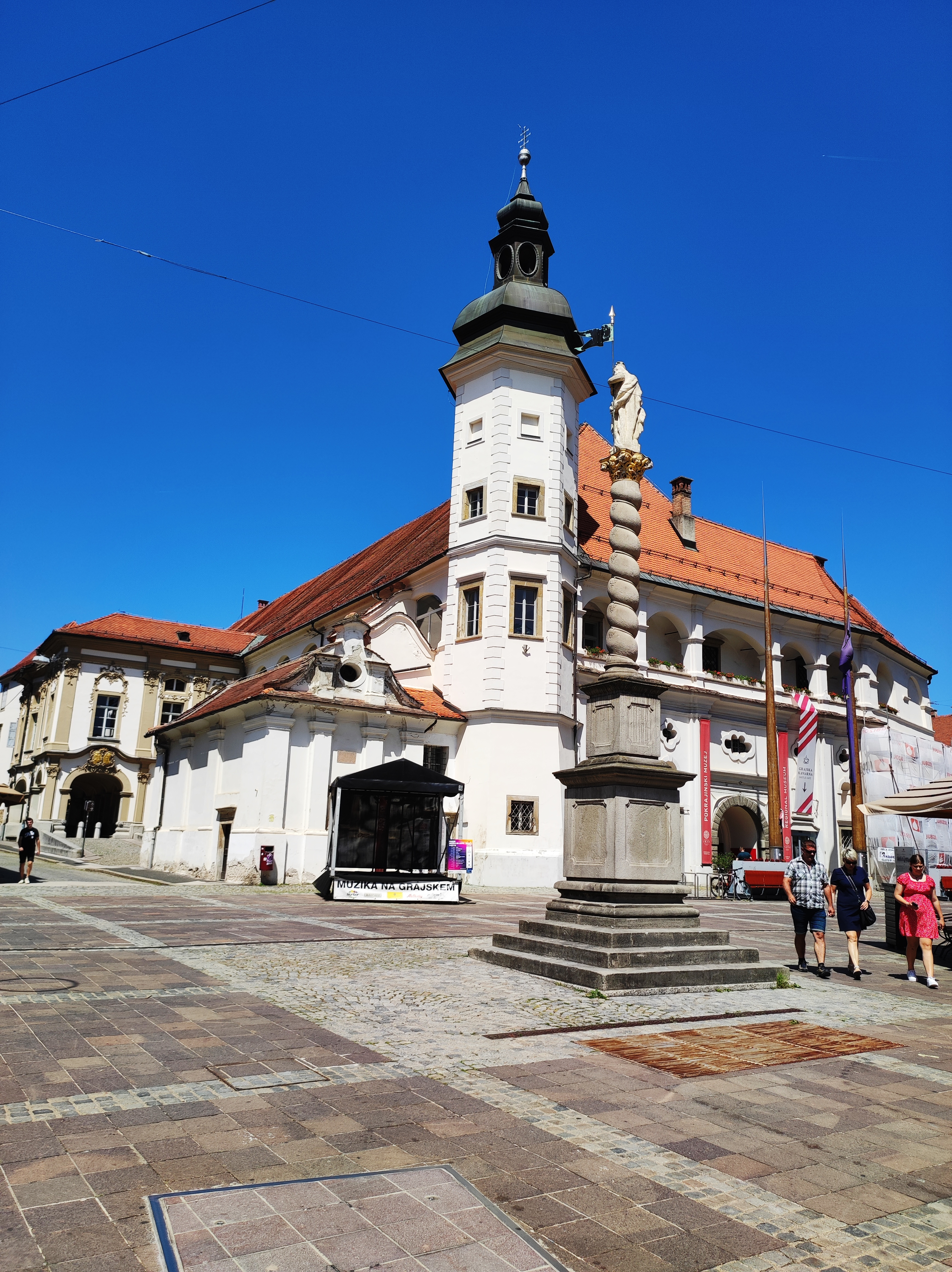

Maribor Castle is a Baroque mansion in the town of Maribor, northeastern Slovenia. It contains a regional museum.

== Lordship Maribor ==
During the Middle Ages, the old and new built castle belonged to the important Lordship Maribor. The following list shows the Lord's of Maribor.

Time	Family	Persons
????–1456	Lords of Walsee	Wolfgang von Walsee (until 1456)
1456–1564	Herren von Graben	Friedrich II von Graben (until 1463), Ulrich III von Graben (until 1486), Wolfgang von Graben (until 1521), Wilhelm von Graben (until 1523), Georg Siegmund von Graben (until 1544), Andrä von Graben (until 1556), Anna von Graben (until 1564)
1564–1620	Herren von Stadl	Carl von Stadl (until 1576), Erasmus Stadler, Franz Stadler
1620–1727	Grafen Zwickel genannt Khiesl	Georg Bartholomeus Zwickel genannt Khissl (until 1656), Jakob Bartholomä Zwickel genannt Khiesl (until 1691), Anna-Maria Zwickel genannt Khiesl (until 1703)
1727–1918	Grafen von Brandis	Jakob von Brandis (1727 until 1746).
