= Vinarium Tower =

Coordinates: 46°34′3.32″N 16°28′5.41″E

- stolp Vinarium
- Vinarium Tower

General information
- Status: Completed
- Type: Observation
- Architectural style: knitted steel tubes
- Location: Lendavske gorice, 229 Dolgovaške Gorice; Lendava 9220, Slovenia
- Construction started: 13 January 2015
- Completed: 15–25 July 2015
- Opening: 2 September 2015
- Cost: €1.8 million
- Owner: Municipality of Lendava

Height
- Tip: 53.5 meters (176 ft)
- Roof: 46.5 meters (153 ft)
- Top floor: 38.5 meters (126 ft)
- Observatory: 42.0 meters (137.8 ft)

Technical details
- Floor count: 9 (+ lobby)
- Lifts/elevators: 1

Design and construction
- Architects: Oskar Virag; Iztok Rajšter
- Main contractor: SGP Pomgrad

The Vinarium Tower (Slovene: stolp Vinarium, Hungarian: Vinarium torony; Vinarium Lendava, Panonnian Basin Lighthouse, Prekmurje Eiffel Tower) is a Slovenian steel construction 53.5-meter (176 ft) tall observation tower in Dolgovaške Gorice, a village in the middle of the Lendava Hills above Lendava. It stands at 302 meters (991 ft) above sea level near the Hungarian border. The architects are Oskar Virag and Iztok Rajšter from the Vires architectural office. This is the highest observation tower in Slovenia. The tower was officially opened on 2 September 2015. The tower allows views into four different countries: Slovenia, Hungary, Austria, and Croatia. The designers expect 30,000 to 50,000 visitors per year.

== Construction ==
Construction was commenced on 13 January 2015 and finished between 15 and 25 July 2015. The SGP Pomgrad company was the main contractor, the Nafta Strojna company was responsible for steel construction, and the Mobitex company for producing steel construction as part of GOI works. The Atrij company from Odranci was the supervisor.

The tower cost almost €1.8 million; about €950,000 came from EU development funds and the rest of the financing was contributed by the Municipality of Lendava, the formal owner of the building.

== Architecture ==
- Structure: steel construction with reinforced concrete lobby
- Overall height: 53.5 meters (176 ft)
- Roof height: 46.5 meters (153 ft)
- Observatory height: 42.0 meters (137.8 ft)
- Top floor: 38.5 meters (126 ft)
- Floor count: lobby + 9 floors
- Elevation: 302 meters (991 ft)
- Lobby area: c. 170 square meters (1,800 sq ft)
- Capacity: 50 visitors
- Volume: 293 cubic meters (10,300 cu ft)
- Total steps: 240
- Elevators: 1
