= Epeka =

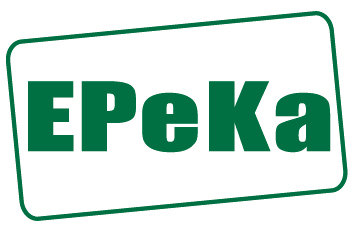
ZRZ EPeKa

EPeKa (The Scientific and Research association for Art, Cultural-Educational programmes and Technology) is a Slovenian association founded in 2008. It is the advisory body for the 2012 European Capital of Culture project. EPeKa integrates creators of contents from fields of culture, art, education, science and technology.
