= Maribor Town Hall =

Coordinates: 46°33′28.07″N 15°38′43.85″E

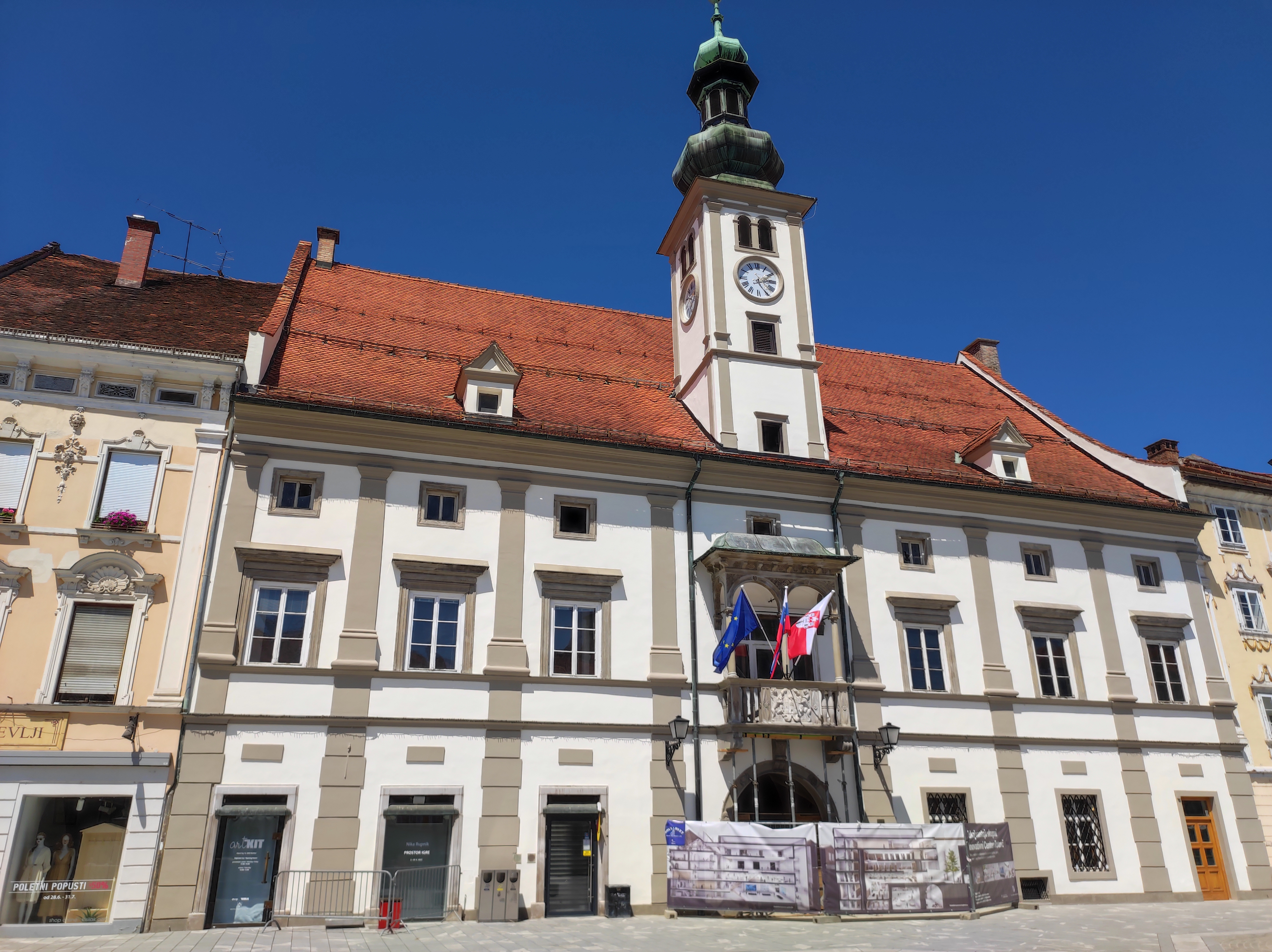
Maribor Town Hall in 2022

Maribor Town Hall (Slovene: Mariborski rotovž) is the town hall of Maribor, Slovenia. It is situated on the town's Main Square (Glavni trg).

Built in 1515, it was remodeled in Renaissance style between 1563 and 1565. In the mid-19th century, it was again renovated in the late Classical style, but was later restored to its original 16th-century appearance.

Adolf Hitler visited Maribor on 26 April 1941, after the city was captured by the Wehrmacht. According to an urban legend he addressed local Germans from the building's main balcony, overlooking the square. This did not happen as neither Hitler nor any of the officers accompanying him held any public speech (containing the infamous sentence "Make this land German again") on that day.

In addition to city offices, the hall also houses a Slovene national cuisine restaurant, Toti Rotovž.

In the square outside the hall there stands the Plague Memorial, which commemorates the "black death" that devastated the city in 1680.
