= 2012–2013 Slovenian protests =

Anti-government protests in Slovenia

- Protesters in front of Maribor's Municipal building on 3 December 2012
- Date: 2 November 2012 – 4 February 2013
- Location: Slovenia
- Caused by: Political corruption; Favouritism, Nepotism and Clientelism
- Goals: Resignation of mayor Franc Kangler and end of corruption and clientelism in the City Municipality of Maribor; Resignation of the government; Abolition of the immunity from prosecution for members of the National Assembly and the National Council; Spread of the protests throughout Slovenia; resignations and prosecutions of politicians and other members of elite, accused of corruption
- Methods: Civil resistance; Demonstrations; Online activism; Police brutality^{[P–1]}; Riots; Vandalism^{[V–1]}
- Result: Franc Kangler's membership in the Slovenian People's Party revoked; Demands for resignation of mayors in Trebnje and Novo mesto; Kangler announces he will not run for a third mayoral term; The Democratic Party of Pensioners of Slovenia exits the ruling coalition in the city council; Srečko Zorko, the ranking Slovenian People's Party city councillor resigns his position; Kangler announces his resignation as Mayor of Maribor; Kanglers' mandate to become a member of the National Council is rejected by a vote of 19 to 18

Casualties
- Injuries: 65
- Arrested: 150; See: casualties section below.

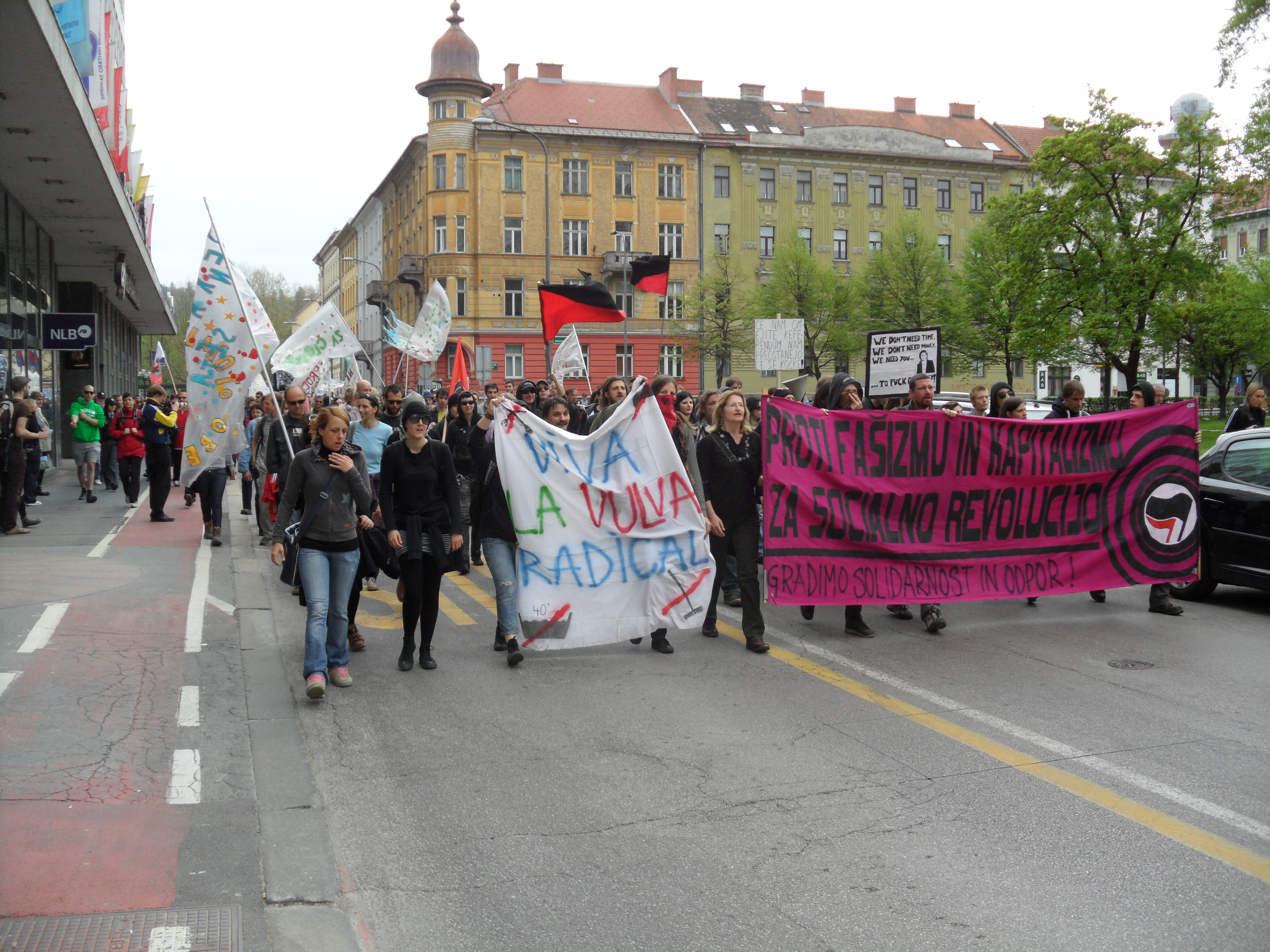
Anticapitalist banners at fifth All-Slovene Uprising in April 2013

The 2012–2013 Slovenian protests were a series of anti-establishment and anti-government protests. Protesters expressed disapproval with the country's ruling political elite, including Maribor mayor Franc Kangler, prime minister Janez Janša, and parliamentary opposition leader Zoran Janković (all of whom stood accused of corruption by Commission for the Prevention of Corruption).

Protests began on 2 November 2012 as the 2012–2013 Maribor protests against the city's mayor Franc Kangler and subsequently spread to other cities across the country, with protesters demanding resignations and prosecution of politicians and other members of the elite, accused of corruption.

== Background ==
Government under the right-wing leader Janez Janša responded to the weakening of Slovenian economy during the global economic crisis and European sovereign-debt crisis with opening up old ideological fronts against liberal media, and against public sector - especially educational and cultural sectors, accusing them of being under influence of members of old regime (called Udbomafia and "Uncles from Behind the Scenes" (In Slovene: "strici iz ozadja")) and against everyone who doubted that austerity measures forced upon Slovenia are right ones.

In relation to the allegations made by official Commission for the Prevention of Corruption, Janša's party sent letters to the right-wing European Parliament members, discrediting the Commission's report as part of "the communist campaign that begun in 1983 with the aim to remove Janša from politics". Since Janša was ignoring the report and his party didn't offer any replacement for him, all three coalition parties and their leaders left the government within weeks and were subjected to ad hominem attacks by Janez Janša who accused the SLS's leader Radovan Žerjav of being "the worst (economics) minister in history of Slovenia", while the leader of the Civic List Gregor Virant has been mocked by Janša as engaging in "virantovanje" (a play on words with kurentovanje, a Slovenian carnival festival).

== Reception ==
=== Reception by public intellectuals ===
The cause for demonstrations has been attributed by some public intellectuals to misunderstanding of post-socialist political elite who rejected "collectivism as socialist pattern" while, according to notable Slovene anthropologist Vesna V. Godina it is in fact a "pre-socialist pattern", originating from the way the traditional Slovene rural community was functioning much longer than in other – mainly Protestant and to much lesser degree in the mainly Catholic – modern nations, who have replaced traditional political culture earlier in history by the modern representative democracy and individualism.

== Timeline ==
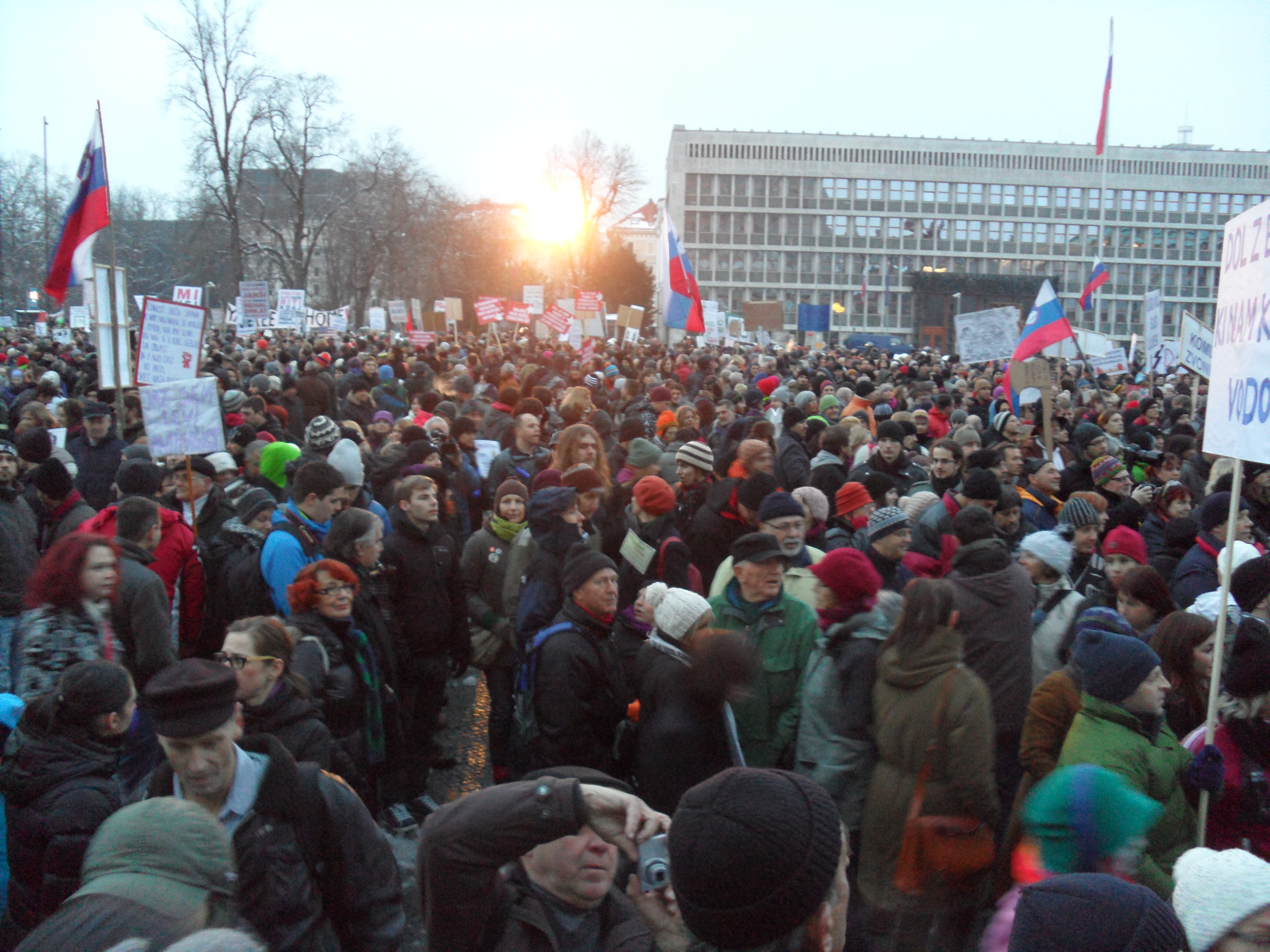
The third All-Slovene Uprising were the largest Slovenian anti-government rally until that point

List of 2012 and 2013 Slovenian protests and figures from the events
Date	Venue	Number of demonstrators^{1}	Arrests	Protesters	Police
Date	Venue	Number of demonstrators^{1}	Arrests	Injured^{2}	
27 November 2012	Ljubljana	1,000	n/a	1	n/a
28 November 2012	Jesenice	60	n/a	n/a	n/a
29 November 2012	Kranj	1,000	2	n/a	n/a
30 November 2012
30 November 2012	Ajdovščina	200	n/a	n/a	n/a
30 November 2012	Koper	250	n/a	n/a	n/a
30 November 2012	Ljubljana	10,000	30	11	15
30 November 2012	Nova Gorica	400–1,500	n/a	n/a	n/a
30 November 2012	Novo mesto	300	n/a	n/a	n/a
30 November 2012	Trbovlje	300	n/a	n/a	n/a
30 November 2012	Velenje	350	n/a	n/a	n/a
2 December 2012	Krško	200	n/a	n/a	n/a
3 December 2012
3 December 2012	Maribor	20,000	n/a	n/a	n/a
3 December 2012	Celje	2,500	15	n/a	n/a
3 December 2012	Ljubljana	4,000	n/a	n/a	n/a
3 December 2012	Ptuj	600	n/a	n/a	n/a
3 December 2012	Ravne na Koroškem	500	n/a	n/a	n/a
3 December 2012	Trbovlje	400	n/a	n/a	n/a
4 December 2012	Jesenice	400	11	n/a	n/a
6 December 2012
6 December 2012	Koper	400	15	n/a	n/a
6 December 2012	Kranj	500	n/a	n/a	n/a
7 December 2012
7 December 2012	Ajdovščina	200	n/a	n/a	n/a
7 December 2012	Bohinjska Bistrica	30	n/a	n/a	n/a
7 December 2012	Ljubljana	1,000–2,000	n/a	n/a	n/a
7 December 2012	Murska Sobota	2,000–2,500	n/a	n/a	n/a
8 December 2012	Nova Gorica	300	n/a	n/a	n/a
9 December 2012	Brežice	100–200	n/a	n/a	n/a
11 January 2013	Ljubljana	8000+	2	n/a	n/a
8 February 2013	Ljubljana	20,000+	5	n/a	n/a
9 March 2013	Ljubljana	5,000+	4	n/a	n/a

Notes

- Note 1: The number of protesters is approximate, given by the media.
- Note 2: The list includes only those who sought and received medical treatment.

== See also ==
- Trans-Universal Zombie Church of the Blissful Ringing
- List of protests in the 21st century
