= Siege of Maribor (1532) =

- Part of the Little War in Hungary within Ottoman–Habsburg wars and the Ottoman wars in Europe
Date	12 – 21 September 1532 (1 week and 2 days)
Location	Maribor, Duchy of Styria within Archduchy of Austria within the Holy Roman Empire (today's Slovenia)
Result	Habsburg victory

Belligerents
Holy Roman Empire: Archduchy of Austria; Duchy of Styria	Ottoman Empire

Commanders and leaders
Christof Wildenrainer	Suleiman the Magnificent; Pargalı İbrahim Pasha

Strength
Unknown	Unknown

Casualties and losses
Unknown	Unknown

The siege of Maribor was a siege of present-day Maribor, then known by its German name Marburg, in the Duchy of Styria within the Archduchy of Austria and the Holy Roman Empire. In the siege that happened during September 1532, a local garrison and citizens defended the fortified town of Maribor against the overwhelming force of the Ottoman Empire, led by their Sultan Suleiman the Magnificent and his Grand Vizier Pargalı Ibrahim Pasha. The Ottomans were marching south after their unsuccessful plan of the siege of Vienna, which was compromised at the siege of Güns where Ottomans have been delayed nearly four weeks.
