= Plague Column (Maribor) =

Monument in Slovenia

Coordinates: 46°33′27.15″N 15°38′43.05″E

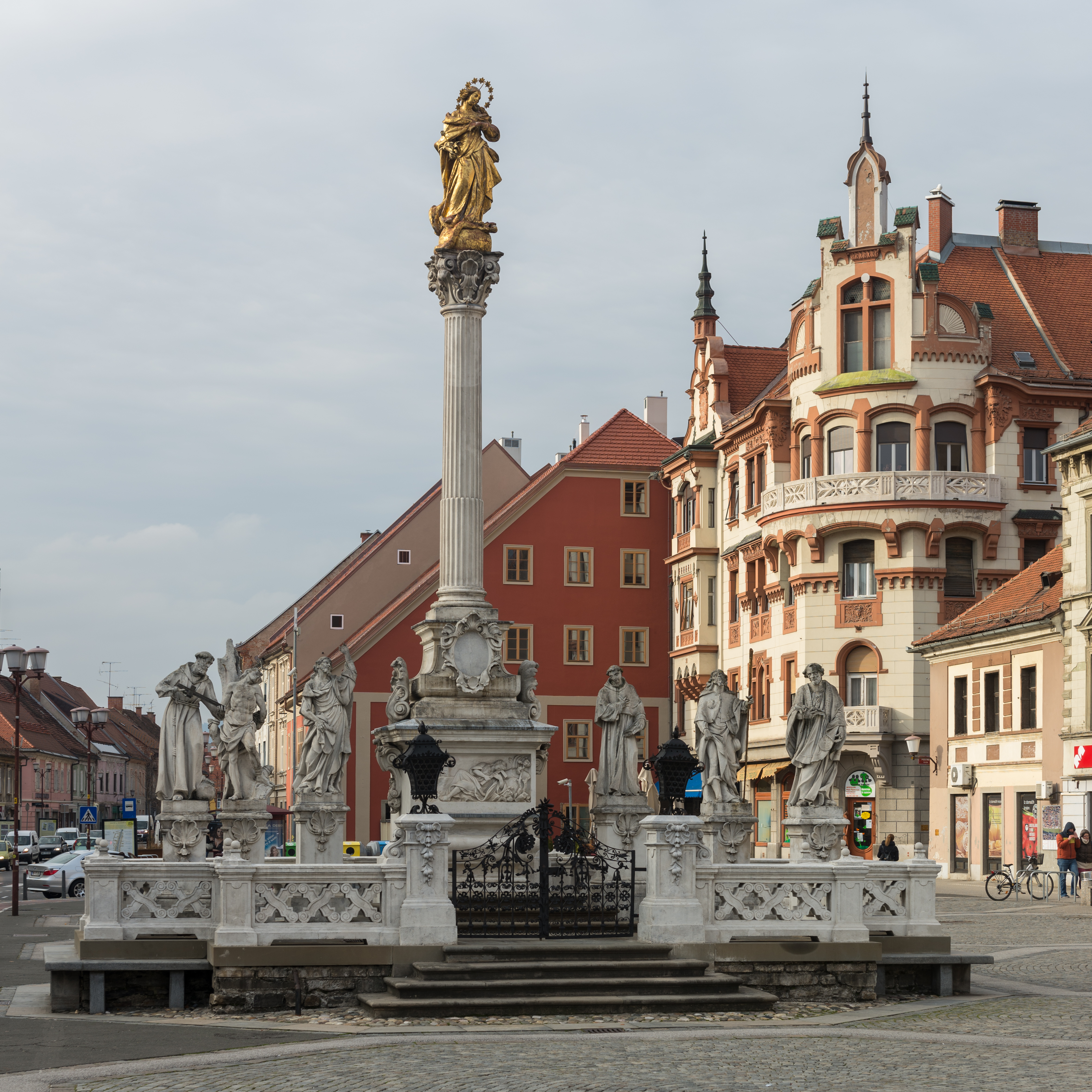
Plague Column at Main Square in Maribor (marble, 1743)

The Plague Column (Slovene: Kužno znamenje) is a monument at Main Square (Glavni trg) of the city of Maribor, northeastern Slovenia, erected by "pious burghers" in gratitude for the end of a 1680 plague epidemic that had claimed a third of the city's population. The original monument was built in 1681. The current one is a 1743 replacement, the first work by the German sculptor Joseph Straub in Maribor. It is considered his most monumental work, and one of the best examples of baroque art in Slovenia.

The column is made entirely of white marble, and consists of an ornate rectangular pedestal that supports a Corinthian column bearing a gilded statue of the Virgin Mary, crowned with twelve stars and standing on the moon (a reference to Revelation 12:1). At its base, the column is surrounded by six saints, to which the townspeople prayed for intercession:

- St. Francis of Assisi
- St. Sebastian
- St. James
- St. Anthony of Padua
- St. Roch
- St. Francis Xavier

The monument was later surrounded by an ornamental stone fence.
