= Franc Kangler =

Slovenian politician

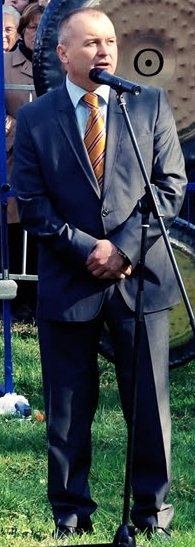
Franc Kangler in 2010

Franc Kangler (born 8 July 1965) is a Slovenian politician. He has served as the mayor of Maribor, the second largest municipality in the country. On 6 December 2012, after a mass protests, he stepped down, and left office on 31 December 2012.

== Education and private life ==
Kangler was born in Maribor and attended elementary school in Duplek. He continued his education at the Secondary Police School in Tacen. After that he obtained a bachelor's degree in law and is currently completing university studies in law at the Faculty of Law at the University of Maribor. He is married and has a daughter.

== National politics career ==
He was an employee of the Ministry of Interior of Slovenia. In 1995, he became secretary of the Municipality of Duplek. In 1996, he was elected as a deputy to the National Assembly of the Republic of Slovenia for the first time. Currently he is serving his third term of office in that capacity.

Franc Kangler has been a member of the national Commission for the Supervision of the Security and Intelligence Services for ten years. He has also been one of the three members of the Slovenian delegation to the NATO Parliamentary Assembly for ten years. He actively participated in several NATO Assemblies, including the ones in Paris, Copenhagen, Orlando, Ottawa, Warsaw, and Prague, as well as in North Atlantic Assemblies in Luxembourg, Ohrid, Bucharest, and Barcelona.

He is Chairman of the Traffic Committee and a member of the Committee on Domestic Policy of the National Assembly. In 2002 he was elected Maribor City Councillor. He is Chairman of the Local Government Commission. He is also President of the Intermunicipal Football Association of Maribor. In addition to that, he is a member of the governing boards of two Maribor institutions: the Firefighting Division and the Slovene National Theatre in Maribor.

== Mayor of Maribor ==
Franc Kangler became the mayor of Maribor for the first time after winning the elections in December 2006, and again in October 2010 when he was re-elected. He won his second mayoral term in the first round and secured a strong coalition in the City Council.

== Corruption and scandals ==
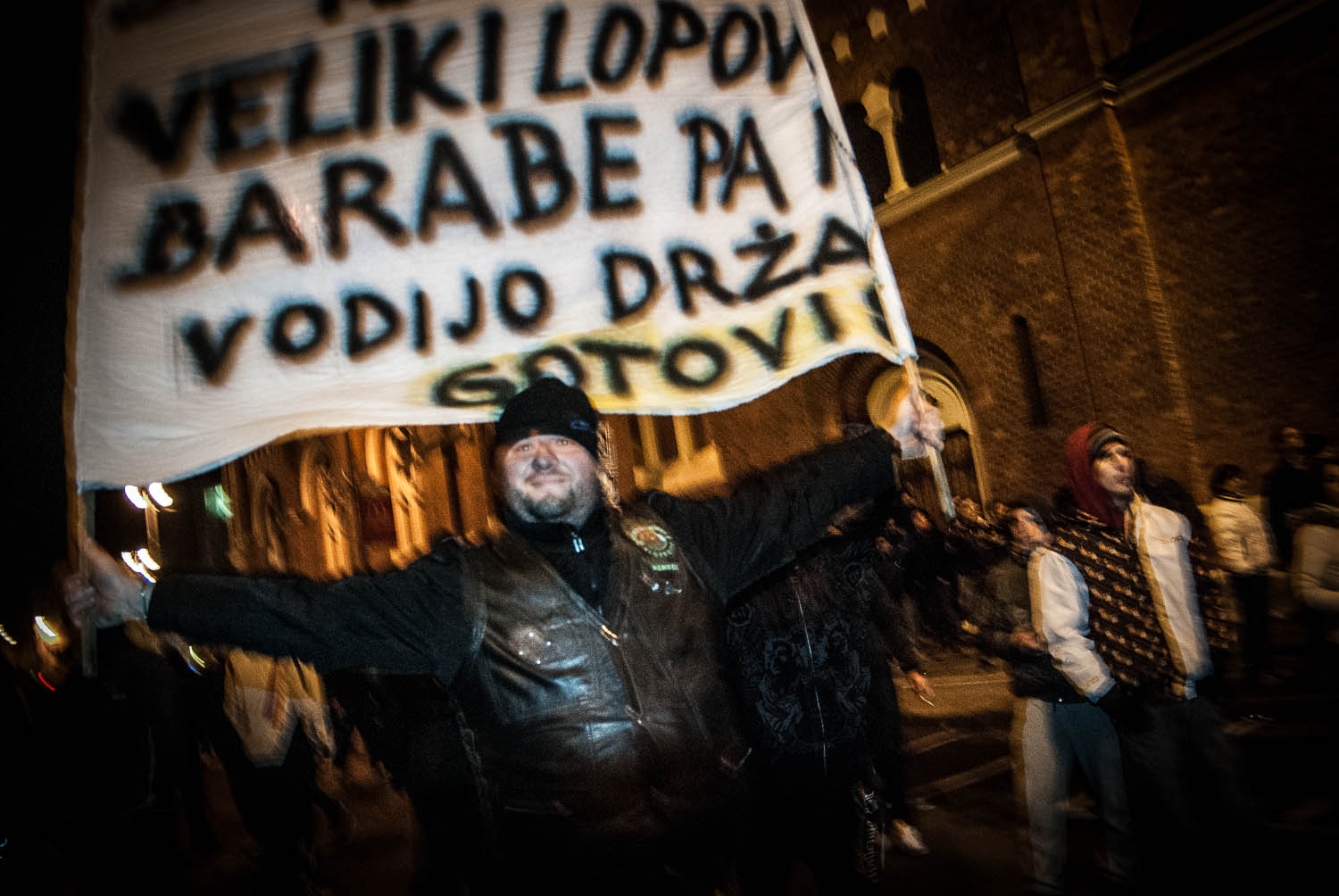
Public protest against Franc Kangler

Franc Kangler was involved in several scandals during his mayoral career, mostly accusing him of corruption and clientelism. Currently, he is facing ten pre-trial or criminal charges due to various reasons.

In November 2012, the Slovenian Commission for Prevention of Corruption was investigating the case of the public company Farmadent and concluded that Kangler acted in a corrupt manner at the expense of public costs and public companies. One of his projects, the implementation of the stationary radar system in Maribor under public-private partnership with the company Iskra Sistemi, is still under investigation.

Due to corruption allegations, pretrial processes, and criminal charges made against him, the citizens of Maribor demanded his resignation in two separate protests in November and one in December under the slogan Gotof je! ('He's done!' in Styrian dialect). He stepped down on 6 December 2012, with his term lasting until 31 December 2012. At the same time, he applied for a seat on the National Council of Slovenia. On 12 December 2012, the office commission refused his candidacy.

In December 2012, the newspaper Dnevnik published an article regarding Kangler's degree from Doba Business College (Slovene: Visoka poslovna šola Doba), where he graduated in April 2008. Dnevnik showed that his thesis was plagiarized from articles published in the journal Lex localis. On 30 January 2013, the college's senate revoked his degree due to plagiarism.
