= 2026 Slovenian parliamentary election =

- 22 March 2026

All 90 seats in the National Assembly 46 seats needed for a majority
- Opinion polls
- Turnout: 70.25% (▼0.71pp)
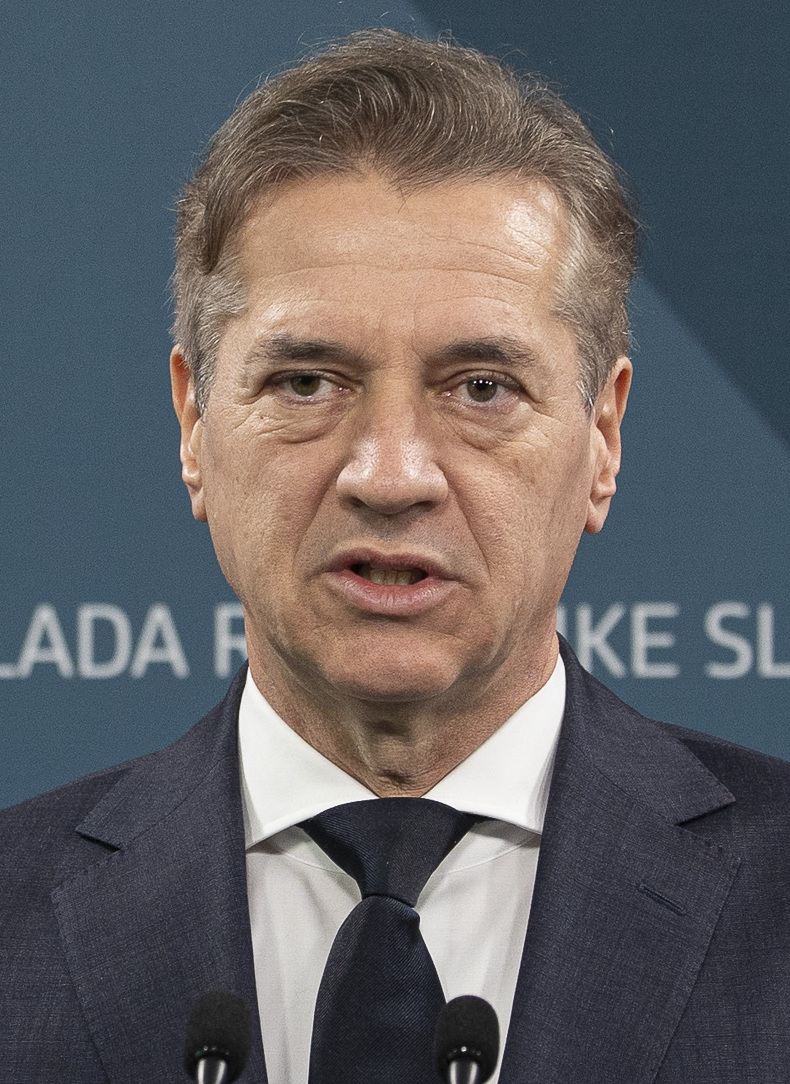

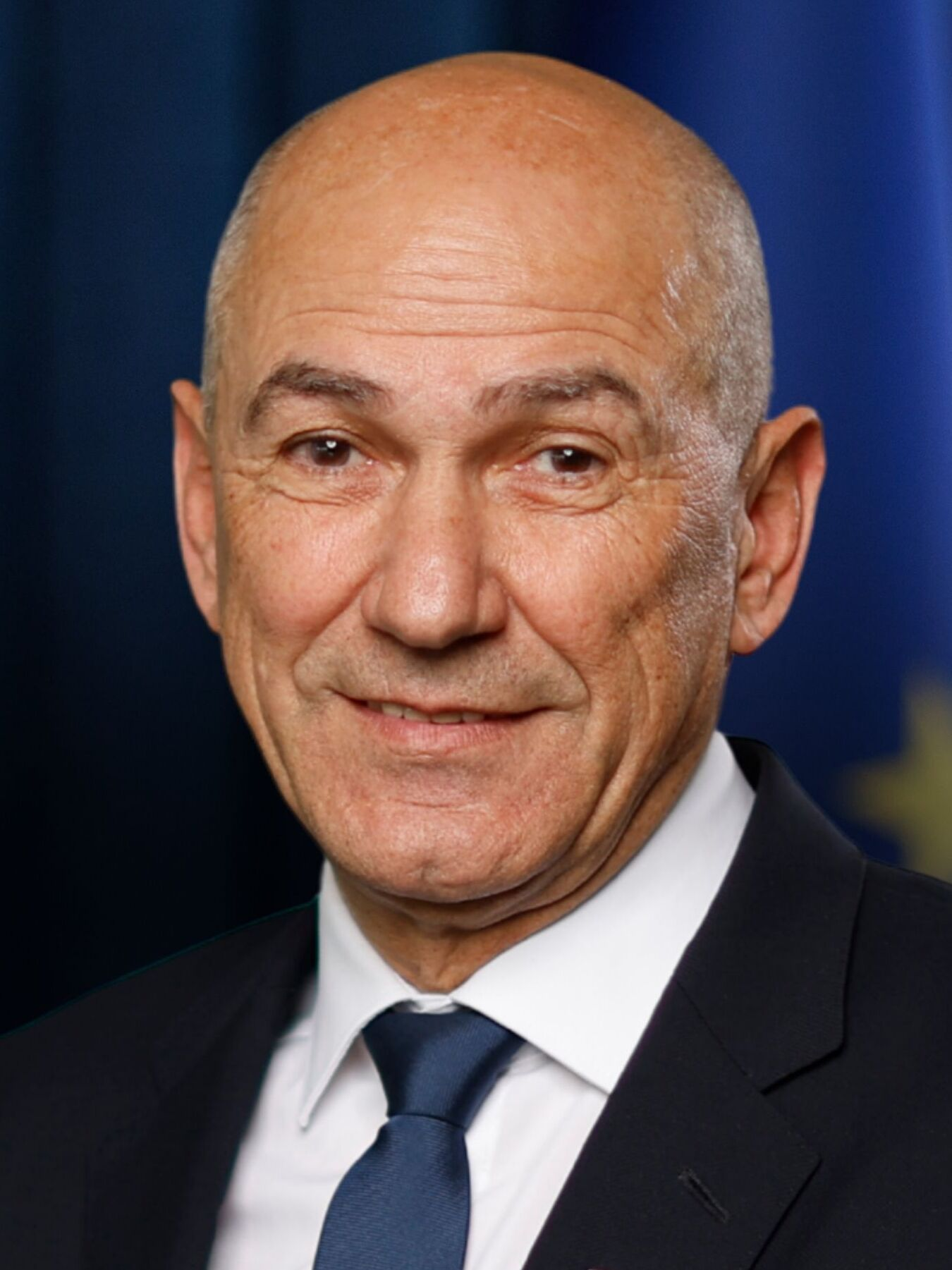

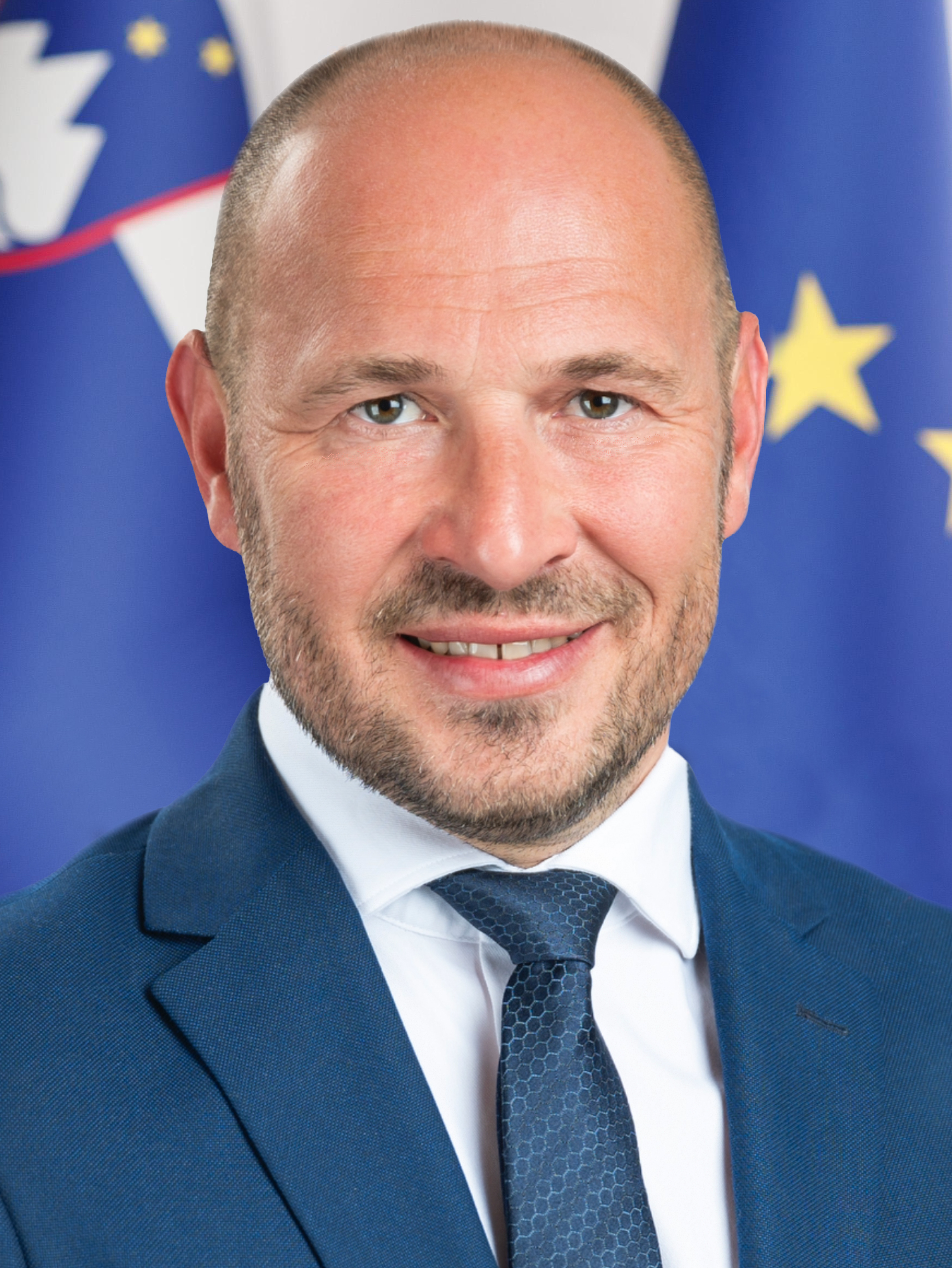

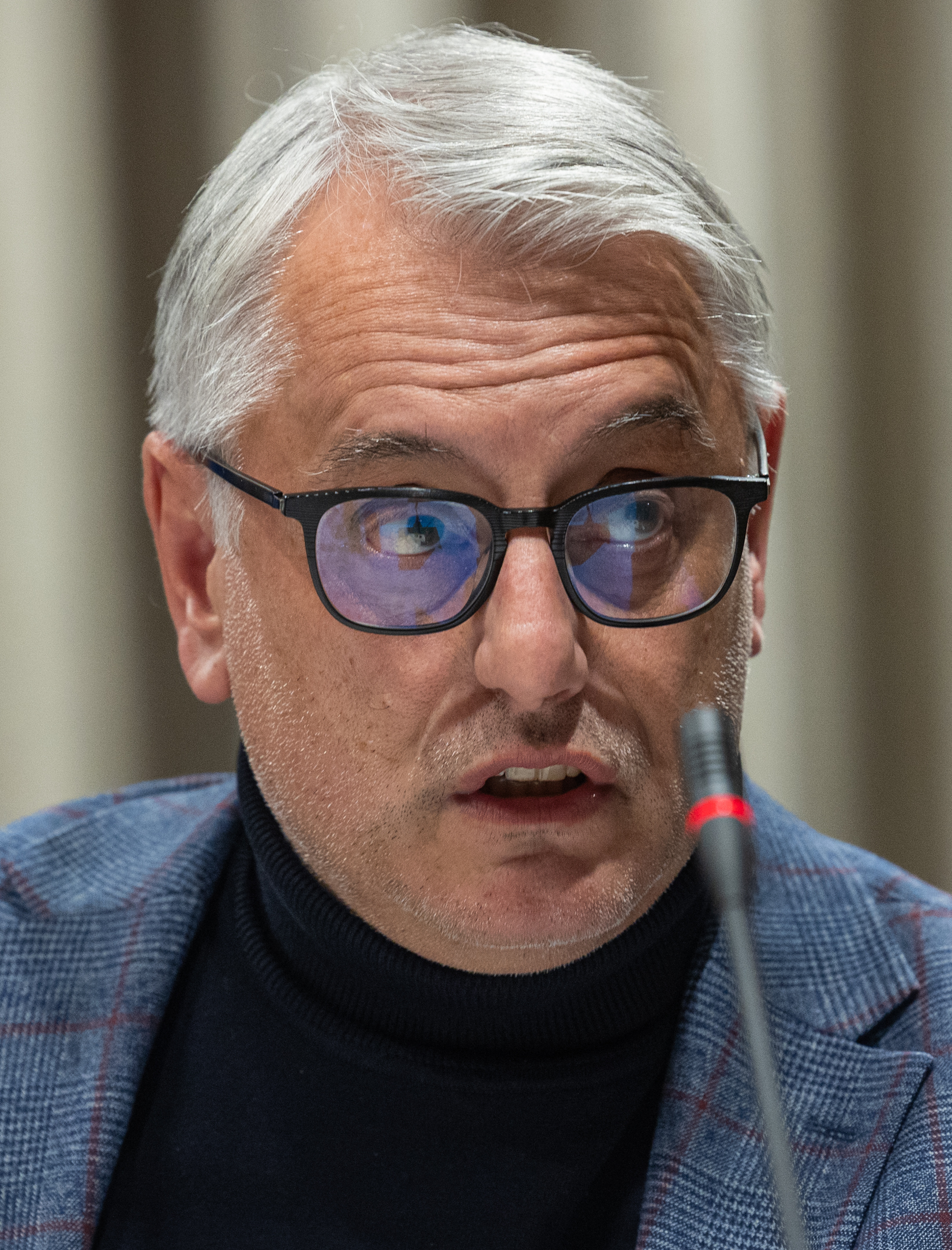

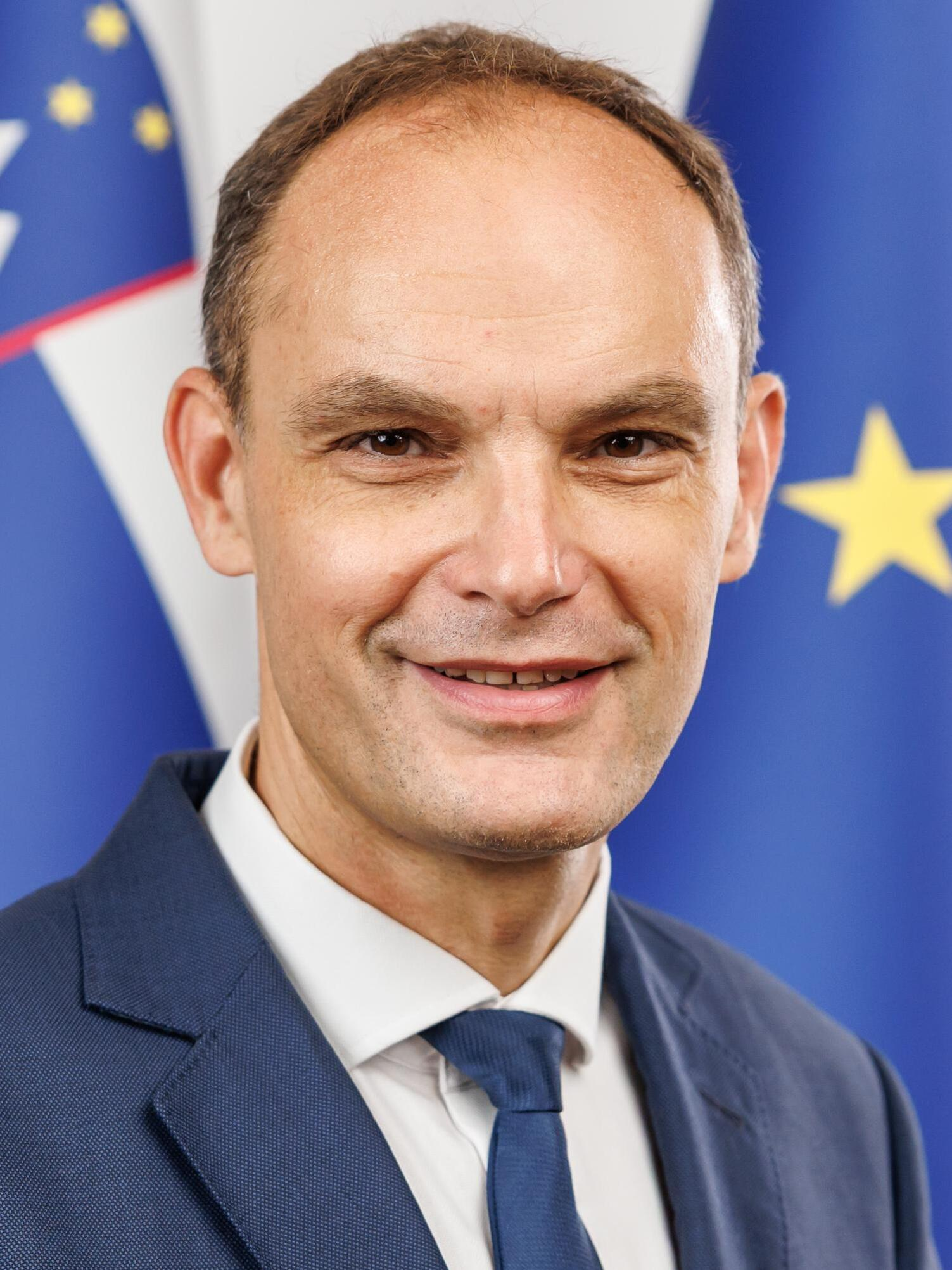

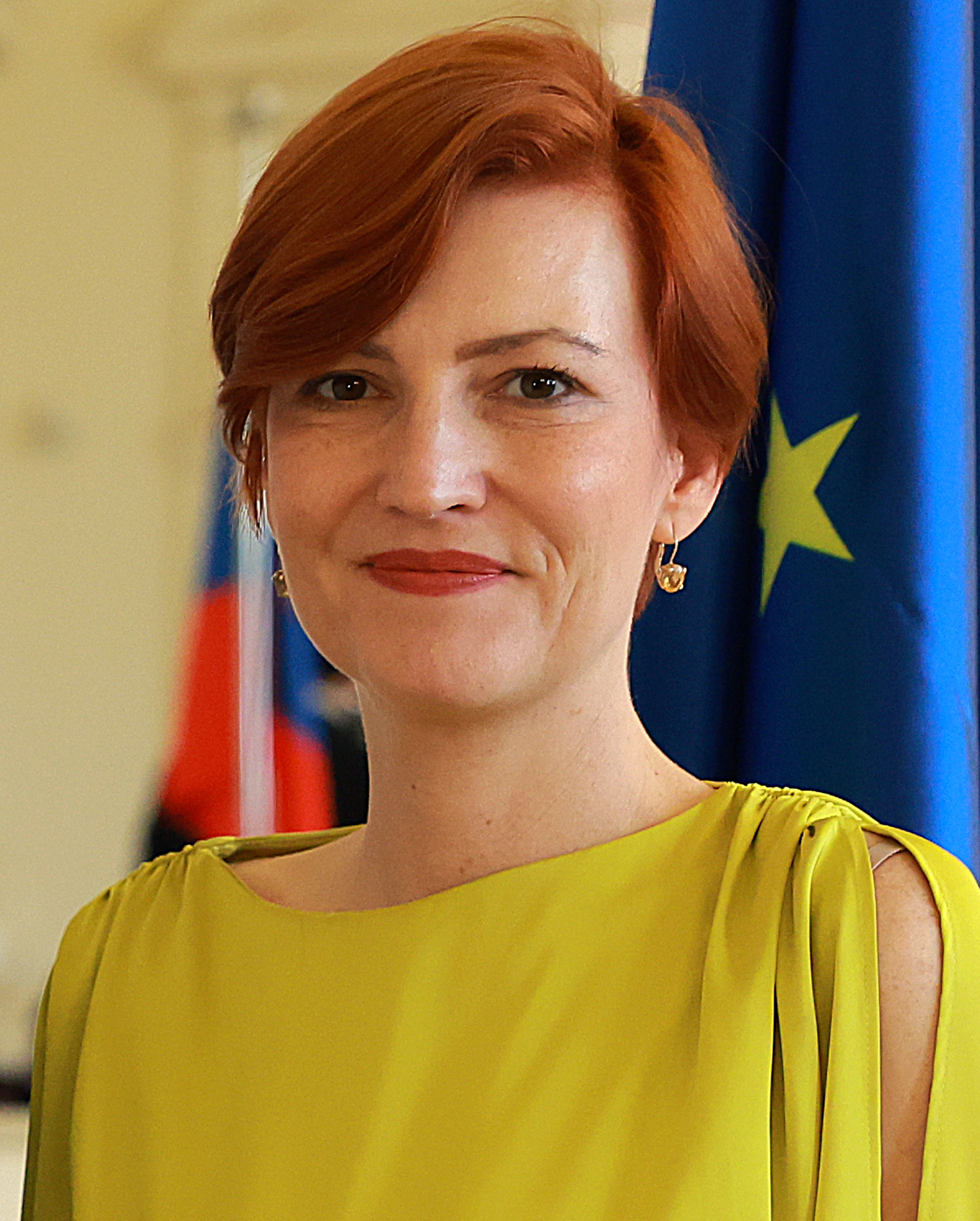

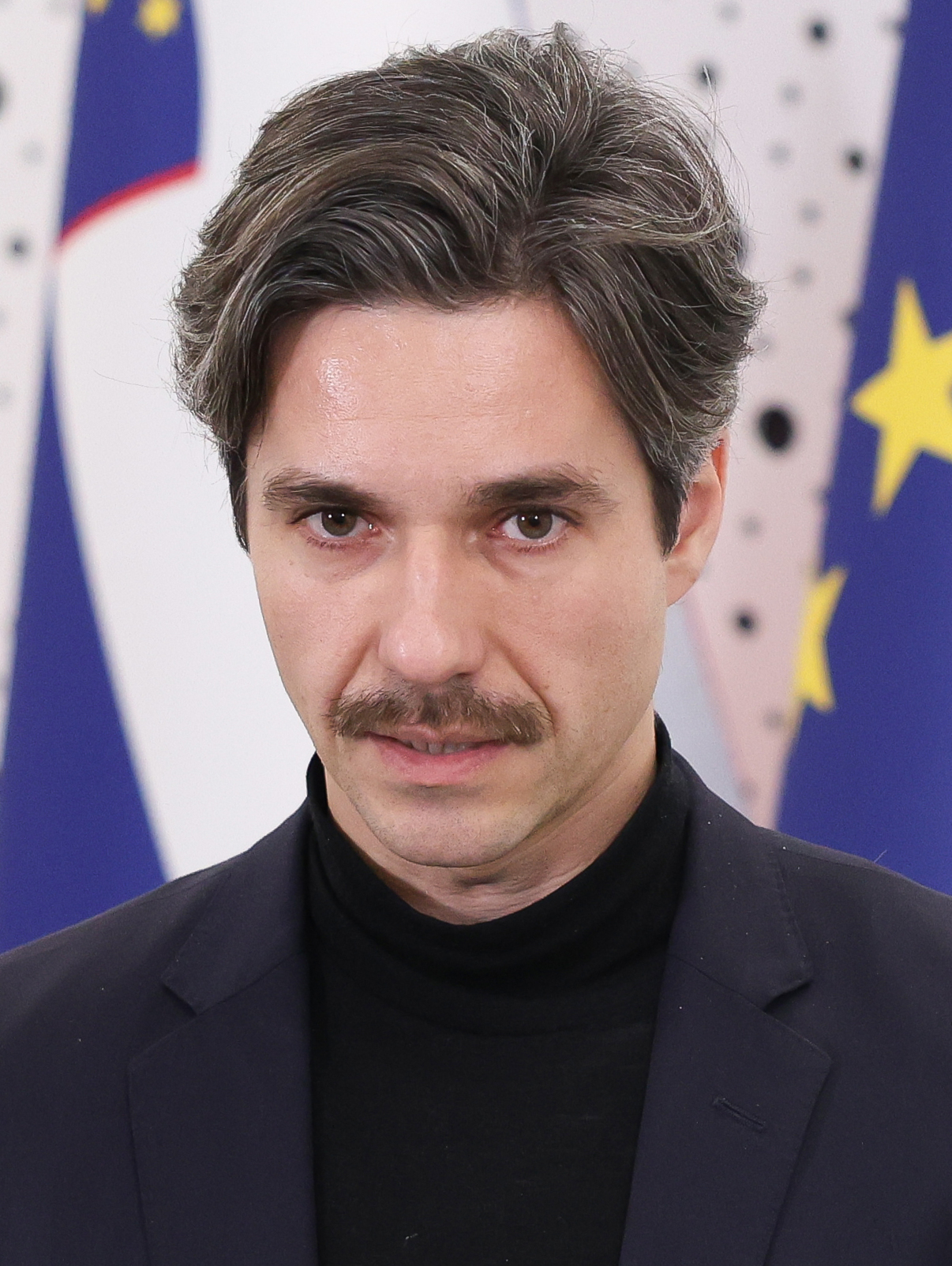

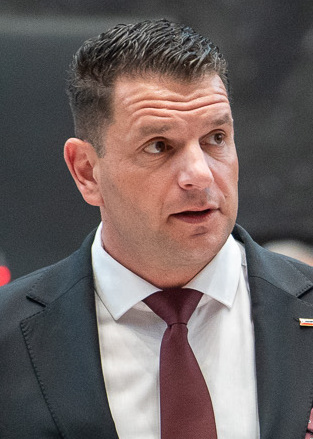
	First party	Second party	Third party
Leader	Robert Golob	Janez Janša	Jernej Vrtovec
Party	GS	SDS	SA
Last election	40.78%, 41 seats (Note: Aggregate results for GS (34,45%, 41 seats), LMŠ (3,72%, 0 seats) and SAB (2,61%, 0 seats). LMŠ and SAB merged into GS in June 2022.)	23.48%, 27 seats	6.86%, 8 seats
Seats won	29	28	9
Seat change	▼12	▲1	▲1
Popular vote	338,102	328,923	109,201
Percentage	28.66%	27.88%	9.26%
Swing	▼12.12 pp	▲4.40 pp	▲2.40 pp
	Fourth party	Fifth party	Sixth party
Leader	Matjaž Han	Anže Logar	Asta Vrečko & Luka Mesec
Party	SD	Democrats	LV
Last election	6.69%, 7 seats	New	5.81%, 5 seats (Note: Aggregate results for Levica (4,46%, 5 seats) and Vesna (1,35%, 0 seats).)
Seats won	6	6	5
Seat change	▼1	New	Steady
Popular vote	79,175	78,902	67,183
Percentage	6.71%	6.69%	5.69%
Swing	▲0.02 pp	New	▼0.12 pp
	Seventh party
Leader	Zoran Stevanović
Party	Resni.ca
Last election	2.86%, 0 seats
Seats won	5
Seat change	▲5
Popular vote	64,799
Percentage	5.49%
Swing	▲2.63 pp
Prime Minister before election
Robert Golob
GS
Elected Prime Minister
Janez Janša
SDS

Parliamentary elections were held in Slovenia on 22 March 2026 to elect the 90 members of the National Assembly. The incumbent coalition government, led by Robert Golob of the Freedom Movement (GS), lost its majority. However, Golob's party narrowly held its position as the largest party, defeating the Slovenian Democratic Party (SDS) by a single seat. Golob later failed to form a government admitting GS would go into opposition. A right-wing coalition was then formed which was led by Janez Janša who became prime minister for a fourth time.

== Background ==
The 2022 parliamentary election held on 24 April resulted in a landslide victory for the newly formed liberal Freedom Movement, led by former energy executive Robert Golob. The party won 34.5% of the vote and 41 seats, the largest number secured by a single party since independence, displacing the incumbent Slovenian Democratic Party government of Prime Minister Janez Janša. Only five parties entered parliament, the fewest since Slovenia's independence.

Golob announced a coalition with the Social Democrats, 7 seats and The Left, 5 seats, giving the coalition a working majority of 53 seats. The coalition agreement was signed on 24 May 2022, and the National Assembly confirmed Golob as prime minister shortly afterward. The 15th Government of Slovenia was sworn in on 1 June 2022, comprising ministers from all three coalition partners.

== Date of the election ==
The Slovenian parliamentary election took place on 22 March 2026, following an announcement by President Nataša Pirc Musar after consultations with parliamentary party leaders. This aligned with the expiry of the four-year term of the National Assembly elected on 24 April 2022.

Under the Constitution of the Republic of Slovenia and the National Assembly Elections Act (Zakon o volitvah v državni zbor), the President of Slovenia issues a decree calling parliamentary elections. Regular elections must be called no earlier than 135 days and no later than 60 days before the end of the Assembly's term, and voting must occur no later than two months before its expiry. Once the decree is published in the Official Gazette, formal electoral procedures begin, including the appointment of electoral bodies and updates to voter registration.

Candidate lists must be submitted no later than 30 days before election day, with constituency electoral commissions verifying them within five days. Campaigning is regulated by the Elections and Referendum Campaign Act, which imposes a 48-hour electoral silence before polls open.

If the National Assembly is dissolved early, such as following the failure to elect a Prime Minister or a successful vote of no confidence. The President must call a snap election within 60 days. The new term begins with the Assembly's first session after the vote. For the 2022 parliamentary election, the presidential decree was issued on 9 February 2022, setting the vote for 24 April 2022. The election was held on 22 March 2026, with the date announced on 22 December 2025.

=== Timetable ===
Key dates
Date	Event
22 October 2025	President Nataša Pirc Musar announces that the elections will take place on either 15, 22 or 29 March 2026.
22 December 2025	President Nataša Pirc Musar announces that the elections will take place on 22 March 2026.
6 January 2026	President Nataša Pirc Musar officially signs the election date into law
12 January 2026	The deadline from which electoral procedures begin to run, such as the collection of party signatures for the submission of candidate lists.
4 February 2026	The parties can open the checking accounts, specifically for the election.
19 February 2026	Beginning of pre-election period. Nominations of candidates close.
6 March 2026	The candidate lists are published.
17–19 March 2026	Early voting – polls open from 7 am to 7 pm.
21 March 2026	Start of the election silence at 12 am.
22 March 2026	Election Day – polls open from 7 am to 7 pm and announcement of the results.

== Electoral system ==
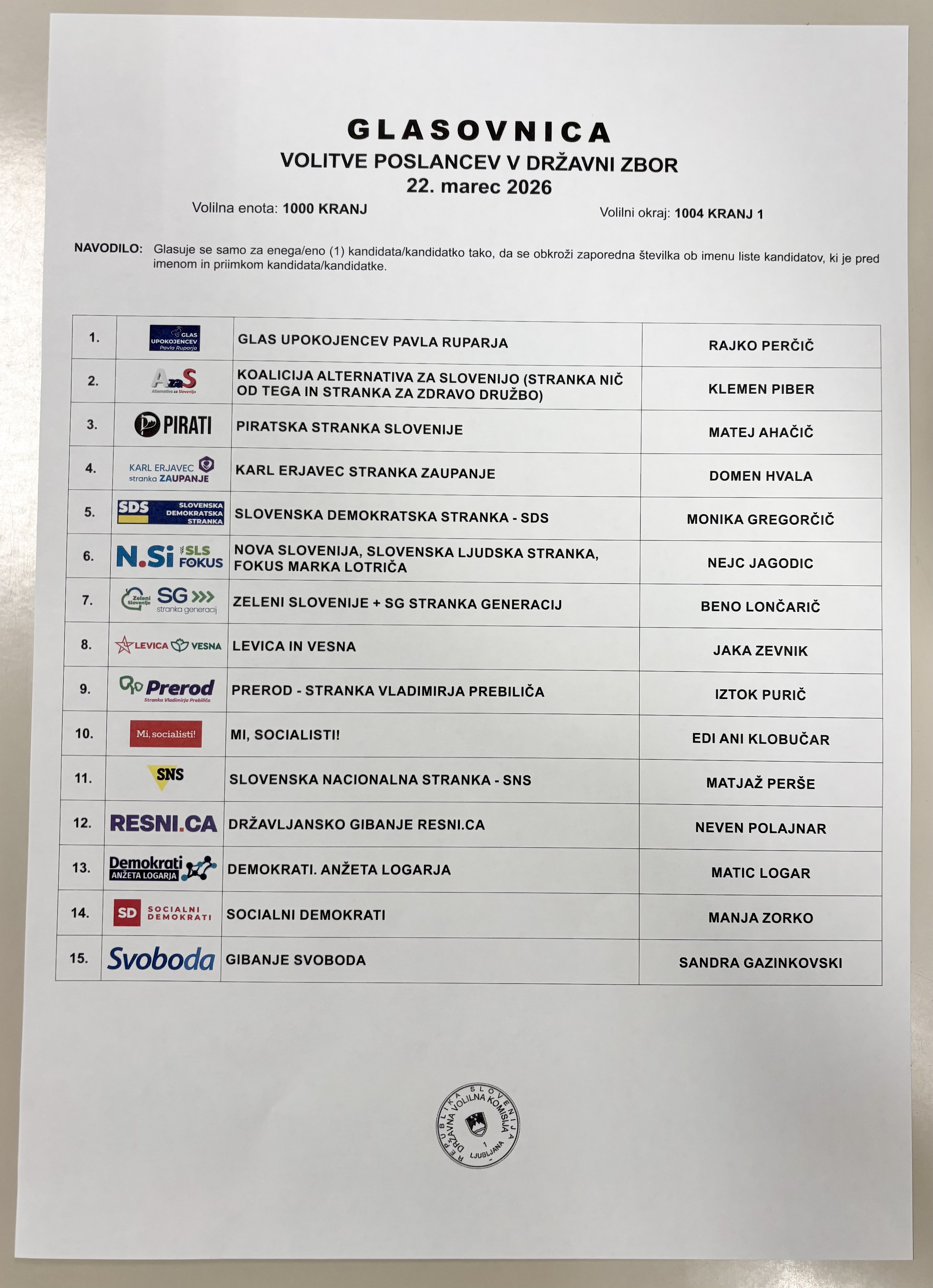
2026 election ballot paper

=== Voting eligibility ===
Citizens of Slovenia who are at least 18 years old on election day are eligible to vote in elections to the National Assembly. Voting rights are universal and equal for all eligible citizens, regardless of social, ethnic, economic, or political affiliation. Individuals deprived of legal capacity by a court decision due to an inability to understand the purpose of elections may be excluded. Slovenian citizens residing abroad also retain voting rights. They may vote by post or at diplomatic and consular missions if they notify authorities within the prescribed deadlines.

Voter registration is automatic and based on the central population register maintained by the Ministry of the Interior. Electoral rolls are compiled 15 days before election day and list voters by their permanent or last registered residence. Voters must cast their ballots at the polling station assigned to them unless eligible for special voting arrangements, such as OMNIA stations for individuals who have changed residence after the roll compilation.

Voting takes place by secret ballot, and Slovenia does not require compulsory voting. Proxy voting is prohibited, except in cases of certified disability where legally defined assistance is permitted. In-person voting is held on election day from 7:00 to 19:00, while limited postal voting is available for hospitalized, detained, or temporarily absent voters who notify the State Election Commission in advance. Members of the Italian and Hungarian national communities possess additional voting rights, enabling them to elect their own representatives in dedicated single-member constituencies, in addition to voting for the remaining 88 deputies under the general system.

=== Voting method and seat allocation ===
The National Assembly consists of 90 members. Of these, 88 are elected through open list proportional representation across eight constituencies, each electing 11 deputies. The remaining two seats are reserved for the Italian and Hungarian minority communities, elected using the plurality voting method. Political parties or lists must surpass the national 4% electoral threshold to qualify for seat allocation. Within each constituency, seats are distributed using the Droop quota method. Voters may cast a preferential vote for a candidate on a party list, influencing the order of election within that list. Remaining seats after constituency allocation are distributed at the national level using the D'Hondt method to maintain proportionality. Although Slovenia is divided into 88 electoral districts, not all districts necessarily elect a deputy, as multiple deputies may be elected from some districts depending on list performance.

Gender quotas apply to candidate lists: at least 35% of candidates must be from each gender, except on three-candidate lists, which must include at least one candidate of each gender. As of October 2025, no amendments had been made to the proportional representation system, and the electoral framework remained unchanged from previous elections, despite a referendum approving the introduction of the preferential vote and ongoing public and political calls for a shift toward a two-round majority electoral system.

== Parties and coalitions ==
=== Parties in Parliament ===
The following parties and lists had seats in the previous National Assembly before the election:

Name			Ideology	Position	Leader	Seats	
Name			Ideology	Position	Leader	2022 election	Before the 2026 election
GS	Freedom Movement; Gibanje Svoboda		Social liberalism	Centre-left	Robert Golob	41 / 90	39 / 90
SDS	Slovenian Democratic Party; Slovenska demokratska stranka		National conservatism	Right-wing	Janez Janša	27 / 90	24 / 90
NSi + SLS + FOKUS	NSi	New Slovenia – Christian Democrats; Nova Slovenija – Krščanski demokrati	Christian democracy	Centre-right	Jernej Vrtovec	8 / 90	8 / 90
NSi + SLS + FOKUS	SLS	Slovenian People's Party; Slovenska ljudska stranka	Agrarianism	Centre-right	Tina Bregant	0 / 90	0 / 90
NSi + SLS + FOKUS	FOKUS	Focus of Marko Lotrič; Fokus Marka Lotriča	Conservatism	Centre-right	Marko Lotrič	New	0 / 90
SD	Social Democrats; Socialni demokrati		Social democracy	Centre-left	Matjaž Han	7 / 90	9 / 90
Levica + Vesna	Levica	The Left; Levica	Democratic socialism	Left-wing	Asta Vrečko; Luka Mesec	5 / 90	3 / 90
Levica + Vesna	Vesna	Vesna – Green Party; Vesna – zelena stranka	Green politics	Centre-left	Urša Zgojznik; Uroš Macerl	0 / 90	0 / 90
DEM	Democrats; Demokrati Anžeta Logarja		Conservative liberalism	Centre-right	Anže Logar	New	3 / 90
MI!	We, Socialists! Mi, socialisti!		Socialism	Far-left	Miha Kordiš	New	1 / 90
ZAU	ZAU	Karl Erjavec - Trust Party; Karl Erjavec – Stranka Zaupanje	Pensioners' interests	Centre	Karl Erjavec	New	0 / 90
ZAU	SUV	Suvereni; Suvereni	Nationalism	Right-wing	Dejan Kaloh	New	1 / 90
IMNS	MPs of Italian and Hungarian national communities Poslanca Italijanske in Madžarske narodne skupnosti				Ferenc Horváth; Felice Žiža	2 / 90	2 / 90

==== Seat changes ====
- On 25 May 2022, Bojan Čebela replaced Robert Golob as a Member of the National Assembly after Golob was elected Prime Minister of Slovenia.
- On 1 June 2022, Matej Arčon, Tanja Fajon, Matjaž Han and Luka Mesec left the National Assembly after being appointed ministers and Secretary-General of the Government. They were replaced by Aleksander Prosen Kralj, Tomaž Lah, Jonas Žnidaršič, Soniboj Knežak and Milan Jakopovič. The first eligible replacement for Arčon, former Minister for Health Danijel Bešič Loredan, declined the call of the National Electoral Commission and returned the mandate.
- Due to his election as Mayor of Lendava on 4 December 2022, Janez Magyar left the National Assembly and was replaced by Andrej Kosi.
- On 20 September 2023, MPs Martin Marzidovšek (for personal reasons) and Dejan Zavec (for health reasons) resigned their seats and were replaced by Jurij Lep and Dejan Süč.
- On 24 October 2023, Freedom Movement expelled MP Mojca Šetinc Pašek. On 20 September 2025, she joined the Social Democrats.
- On 7 December 2023, following his appointment to Minister for Public Administration, Franc Props was replaced by Jernej Žnidaršič.
- On 12 January 2024, after being appointed Minister for Agriculture, Mateja Čalušić was replaced by former minister Uroš Brežan.
- On 26 April 2024, due to personal reasons, Monika Pekošak was replaced by Branko Zlobko.
- On 16 July 2024, following their election to the European Parliament, Matej Tonin and Branko Grims left the National Assembly and were replaced by Andrej Poglajen and Franc Medic.
- On 14 October 2024, Anže Logar left the Slovenian Democratic Party. On 21 October 2024, Eva Irgl and Dejan Kaloh followed. Logar founded the party Democratson 14 November 2024, joined by Irgl as vice-president. After his fight with Logar, Kaloh later founded his own party Suvereni on 20 June 2025.
- Following the election of Marjan Šarec as a Member of the European Parliament, he was replaced by Borut Sajovic, who was subsequently replaced by Aleš Lipičnik on 21 October 2024.
- On 10 March 2025, Miha Kordiš was expelled from The Left. On 16 November 2025, he founded the political party We, Socialists!.
- On 13 October 2025, following allegations of physical violence against a former partner, MP Jani Prednik resigned his seat and was replaced by Janja Rednjak.
- On 1 December 2025, after being appointed Minister of the Interior, Branko Zlobko was replaced by Mateja Zupan Josipović.
- On 6 January 2026, Matej Tašner Vatovec left The Left for SD.

=== Other parties ===
List of non-parliamentary parties contesting the election
Name			Ideology	Position	Leader/s	2022 Result
ZS + SG	ZS	Greens of Slovenia; Zeleni Slovenije	Green conservatism	Centre-right	Andrej Čuš	3.4% (Note: Part of POS)
ZS + SG	SG	Party of Generations; Stranka Generacij	Social liberalism		Vlado Dimovski	New (Note: Merger of the parties DD (1.7% in an alliance with NP in 2022) and DeSUS (0.7% in 2022))
RES	Tru.th; Resni.ca		Right-wing Populism	Right-wing	Zoran Stevanović	2,9%
AZAS	ZD	For a Healthy Society; Za zdravo družbo	Non-ideologic		Jure Pogačnik	1,8%
AZAS	NOT	None of This; Nič od tega	Noneoftheaboveism	Political satire	Boris Žulj; Violeta Tomić	New
PIR	Pirate Party of Slovenia; Piratska stranka Slovenije		Pirate politics	Syncretic	Jasmin Feratović	1,6%
SNS	Slovenian National Party; Slovenska nacionalna stranka		Nationalism	Far-right	Zmago Jelinčič Plemeniti	1,5%
SLOGA	Unity; Sloga		Liberalism	Centre	Janko Veber	0.1% (Note: Part of the Liberate Slovenia Alliance)
GU	Pavel Rupar's Voice of Pensioners; Glas upokojencev Pavla Ruparja		Pensioners' interests	Centre-right	Pavel Rupar	New
PVP	Prerod – Party of Vladimir Prebilič; Prerod – Stranka Vladimirja Prebiliča		Social liberalism	Centre-left	Vladimir Prebilič	New
SUS	Solution – Party of Pensioners Velenje, Slovenia; Rešitev – Stranka upokojencev Velenje, Slovenija		Pensioners interests	Right-wing	Faruk Pijuković	New

== Campaign ==
=== New political parties ===
A number of new political parties emerged after the previous election. The first was Pavel Rupar's Voice of Pensioners, founded at its inaugural congress on 20 January 2024 by former SDS MP and Mayor of Tržič Pavel Rupar. Ahead of the 2024 European Parliament election, the satirical party None of the Above was established under the leadership of activist Boris Žulj and former The Left MP Violeta Tomić. In the same year, former foreign minister Anže Logar began building his own political party, and following his departure from SDS, the party Democrats was formally founded. Another new party, Karl Erjavec - Trust Party, led by four-time DeSUS Minister Karl Erjavec, was established soon afterwards.

In early 2025, Marko Lotrič, President of the National Council, founded his party Focus of Marko Lotrič at an inaugural congress held at Brdo pri Kranju. Later that year, DeSUS and Good State merged into the Party of Generations, led by former Minister of Labor Vlado Dimovski. Former SDS MP Dejan Kaloh founded the party Suvereni, and a party of local lists, Community, was formed under the leadership of Mayor of Hrastnik Marko Funkl.

The party Prerod – Party of Vladimir Prebilič was founded by former Mayor of Kočevje, 2022 presidential candidate and MEP Vladimir Prebilič, and former The Left MP and another 2022 presidential candidate Miha Kordiš founded the socialist party We, Socialists! Two further projects were reported to be in the process of establishment, The Guard, linked to Catholic podcaster Alen Koman, and Volt Slovenia, as a Slovenian branch of the pan-European federalist movement Volt Europa. Unlike Volt Slovenia, The Guard collected 200 signatures in time to establish a new political party, but failed to collect 100 signatures in each of the 8 electoral districts which would place the party on ballot.

=== Pre-election cooperation ===
Pre-election alliances, mergers, and cooperation talks reshaped the landscape. Greens of Slovenia first called for the unification of green forces on a joint list. The Left and Vesna – Green Party signed a pre-election agreement announcing a joint run in the election; the cooperation was later formally confirmed by both parties in their internal bodies. Talks about cooperation within this broader left-green axis also included the newly established localist party Community, which is also a potential partner for Prerod, as was Party of Generations until they announced they would contest the election alone. In addition, a public appeal on social media, with the liberal activist Jaša Jenull urging We, Socialists!, The Left, Vesna, and the Pirates to join forces and establish a United Progressive Front.

On the centre-left, Prerod announced talks with the Social Democrats and related cooperation initiatives on the wider left. However, Prerod later rejected the option of a joint list with SD and announced it would run independently, while leaving open further talks with the Party of Generations, although they later also rejected this option. Prebilič also invited the leaders of several centre-left parties to a meeting intended to explore future cooperation, but the meeting did not take place because most invitees declined. Robert Golob invited SD, The Left, We, Socialists!, Pirates, Prerod, Vesna and unexpectedly Resni.ca for talks. Resni.ca rejected the offer and Karl Erjavec claimed that his Karl Erjavec - Trust Party was not invited because it cannot be "cannibalized".

On the centre-right, Concretely merged into Democrats, and New Social Democracy, led by Andrej Magajna, later announced they were in talks about a united participation with Democrats, which was later abandoned and New Social Democracy didn't file to participate in the election. New Slovenia and the Slovenian People's Party opened talks on possible joint cooperation, and NSi, SLS, and FOKUS each signed a separate declaration of intent and began coordinating a potential common list and the distribution of constituencies.

On the nationalist side, Suvereni, United Slovenia Movement and Party of Slovenian People, MP Dejan Kaloh, Andrej Šiško and Ivan Bolfek, announced efforts to form a "sovereigntist–patriotic bloc" and referenced the political action SLOEXIT, proposing Slovenia's withdrawal from the EU and a debate on leaving NATO. Suvereni representatives later appeared at an event organised by Karl Erjavec – Trust Party, where cooperation and the formation of a new parliamentary group were discussed. However, Suvereni subsequently decided to run independently rather than enter an electoral partnership with Karl Erjavec – Trust Party, and United Slovenia Movement and Party of Slovenian People announced the forming of the Coalition of the United Nations. After DVK rejected KZN's lists in three electoral districts, they withdrew from the election altogether. Eventually, Suvereni decided to participate on the lists of the Trust Party.

In the centre, Greens of Slovenia and Party of Generations formed an alliance. Among smaller actors, None of This and For a Healthy Society announced plans for a joint electoral list, while Resni.ca was reportedly invited but declined.

=== Leadership changes ===
The Left were the first to change coordinators when they replaced Luka Mesec with Asta Vrečko in 2023. Social Democrats were next when they elected Matjaž Han as party president, after Tanja Fajon resigned after Litijska Affair. In 2025, several parties reaffirmed their leaders or elected new ones. Slovenian Democratic Party subsequently held its congress, at which Janez Janša was reconfirmed as party president and continuing his 33-year long streak at the helm of the party. New Slovenia then followed as they elected Jernej Vrtovec as party president, succeeding Matej Tonin. Freedom reaffirmed Robert Golob as party president at its electoral congress. The electoral congress of The Left followed, with current coordinator Asta Vrečko and former coordinator Luka Mesec confirmed as co-coordinators. Vesna reconfirmed its co-leadership, with Urša Zgojznik and Uroš Macerl continuing as co-presidents.

=== Slogans ===
Party	Original slogan	English translation
Alternative for Slovenia	Alternativa obstaja!	Alternative exists!
Democrats	Obstaja izbira.	Choice exists.
Freedom Movement	Slovenija naprej.	Slovenia Forward.
Karl Erjavec - Trust Party	Delajmo skupaj uspešno Slovenijo – DeSUS	Let's work together, for a successful Slovenia – DeSUS
Greens of Slovenia and Party of Generations	Izbira za vse generacije	A choice for all generations
Together in Action	Skupaj v akcijo!	Together in action!
Solution – Party of Pensioners Velenje, Slovenia	Z vami. Za vas. Pošteno in brez strahu.	With you. For you. Honest and fearless.
Voice of Pensioners	Izkušnje, ki združujejo, vizija, ki navdihuje.	Experiences that unite, a vision that inspires.
Pirate Party of Slovenia	Tokrat Pirati!	This time, Pirates!
Prerod – Party of Vladimir Prebilič	Prerodimo Slovenijo	Rebirth Slovenia
Resni.ca	Moč ljudem!	Power to the people!
Social Democrats	Dogovor. Za mir, razvoj in blaginjo.	Agreement. For peace, development, and prosperity.
Slovenian Democratic Party	Vstani, Slovenija!	Stand up, Slovenia!
Slovenian National Party	Slovenijo Slovencem!	Slovenia for Slovenes!
Levica and Vesna	Čas odločitve.	Time of the decision.
Unity	Za skupno dobro.	For the greater good.
We, Socialists!	Naša politika je robinhoodovska.	Our politics are Robin Hood–style.

== Debates and interviews ==
=== Debates ===
Robert Golob announced on Instagram a list of four proposed debates with Janez Janša. Meanwhile, SDS and the bloc formed by NSi, SLS, and FOKUS announced that they would not participate in debates on RTV due to the broadcaster's decision not to air the programme Tarča, although they later reversed their decision. Janša confirmed his participation only in a debate hosted by the AIDEA podcast, led by Klemen Selakovič. He also proposed a public debate format, suggesting venues such as Cankar Centre, Exhibition and Convention Centre, or Maribor. Under his proposal, each candidate would be allowed to bring two journalists to ask questions, while members of the audience would also have the opportunity to participate.

During the pre-election campaign, TV SLO 1 broadcast a total of eight televised election debates, scheduled between 19 February and 19 March. Debates involving parliamentary parties aired on five Thursdays at 8:00 p.m., starting on 19 February, while debates featuring non-parliamentary parties were broadcast on three Mondays at 8:00 p.m., beginning on 2 March. The debates also included thematic programmes focusing on specific policy areas, including healthcare and long-term care, foreign policy and security, as well as the economy, taxation, and wages. The pre-election series concluded with a final debate between the leaders of parliamentary parties on 19 March. On Radio Prvi, election debates was held on Wednesdays at 5:00 p.m. between 25 February and 18 March. The final debate brought together representatives of all political parties.

POP TV organised six election debates, broadcast on four Mondays and two Fridays between 23 February and 20 March. Unlike previous election campaigns, the broadcaster recorded most debates on location, including in Koper (23 February), Ljubljana (UKC Ljubljana, 2 March), Novo mesto (6 March), Kranj (9 March), and Maribor (16 March). The final debate, held on the evening before the start of the election silence, will take place in a television studio. On Planet TV, the debate series Slovenia Chooses aired on Sundays at 8:00 p.m., starting on 22 February, and was hosted by Katarina Braniselj and Luka Svetina. On Nova24TV, the election debates were held between 25 February and 18 March, and were hosted by Aleksander Rant.

2026 Slovenian parliamentary election debates
Date	Time	Organiser	Moderator	P Present S Surrogate N Non-invitee A Abstained															
Date	Time	Organiser	Moderator	GS	SDS	NSi + SLS + FOKUS	SD	Levica + Vesna	ZS + SG	RES	PIR	SNS	DEM	PVP	MI!	GU	ZAU	AZAS	Refs
19 February 2026	20:05	RTV	Tanja Gobec; Nastja Stopar	P Robert Golob	A	A	P Matjaž Han	P Luka Mesec	N	N	N	N	P Anže Logar	P Vladimir Prebilič	P Miha Kordiš	N	N	N	
22 February 2026	20:00	Planet	Katarina Braniselj; Luka Svetina	S Klemen Boštjančič	S Aleš Hojs	P Jernej Vrtovec	P Matjaž Han	P Urša Zgojznik	N	S Katja Kokot	N	P Zmago Jelinčič Plemeniti	P Anže Logar	P Vladimir Prebilič	P Miha Kordiš	N	N	N	
23 February 2026	20:00	POP	Darja Zgonc; Edi Pucer	P Robert Golob	P Janez Janša	P Jernej Vrtovec	P Matjaž Han	P Luka Mesec	N	P Zoran Stevanović	N	N	P Anže Logar	P Vladimir Prebilič	P Miha Kordiš	N	N	N	
25 February 2026	17:00	Radio Prvi	Špela Novak; Robert Škrjanc	S Urška Klakočar Zupančič	A	S Jožef Horvat	S Tanja Fajon	P Asta Vrečko	N	N	N	N	S Mihael Zupančič	S Klemen Grošelj	S Arne Jakob Zakrajšek	N	N	N	
25 February 2026	20:00	Nova24	Špela Novak; Robert Škrjanc	A	S Zdravko Počivalšek	P Marko Lotrič	A	A	N	N	N	N	A	N	N	N	N	N	
26 February 2026	20:00	RTV	Katarina Veselič Golob; Barbara Vidmajer	S Tamara Kozlovič	S Zvone Černač	S Janez Cigler Kralj	S Branko Gabrovec	S Biserka Marolt Meden	N	N	N	N	S Tadej Ostrc	S Janez Poklukar	P Miha Kordiš	N	N	N	
2 March 2026	20:00	POP	Maja Sodja	S Tamara Kozlovič	S Jelka Godec	P Tina Bregant	S Matej Tašner Vatovec	S Biserka Marolt Meden	N	S Sabina Senčar	P Jasmin Feratović	N	S Tadej Ostrc	N	N	N	N	N	
2 March 2026	20:00	RTV	Elen Batista Štader; Tadeja Anžlovar	N	N	N	N	N	P Vlado Dimovski	S Katja Kokot	S Leon Božič	P Zmago Jelinčič Plemeniti	N	N	N	N	N	P Violeta Tomić	
3 March 2026	20:00	Večer	Matej Grošelj; Matija Stepišnik	S Alenka Bratušek	S Franc Kangler	P Tina Bregant	S Boris Sovič	P Asta Vrečko	N	P Zoran Stevanović	N	N	S Tadej Ostrc	P Vladimir Prebilič	N	N	N	N	
4 March 2026	17:00	Radio Prvi	Erika Štular; Špela Novak	N	A	S Jožef Horvat	S Matevž Frangež	S Dan Juvan	P Vlado Dimovski	P Zoran Stevanović	P Jasmin Feratović	N	N	N	N	N	N	N	
4 March 2026	20:00	Nova24	Aleksander Rant	A	S Luka Simonič	S Janez Cigler Kralj	A	A	N	N	N	N	S Luka Mihalič	N	N	N	N	N	
5 March 2026	20:00	RTV	Manica J. Ambrožič; Adrijan Bakič	P Robert Golob	S Tone Kajzer	S Jožef Horvat	S Luka Goršek	P Luka Mesec	N	N	N	N	P Anže Logar	P Vladimir Prebilič	P Miha Kordiš	N	P Karl Erjavec	N	
6 March 2026	20:00	Nova24	Boris Tomašič	N	N	N	N	N	P Vlado Dimovski	N	N	N	N	N	N	P Pavel Rupar	P Karl Erjavec	N	
6 March 2026	20:00	POP	Jani Muhič	S Alenka Bratušek	S Zvone Černač	P Marko Lotrič	S Meira Hot	P Asta Vrečko	N	P Zoran Stevanović	P Jasmin Feratović	N	P Anže Logar	N	N	N	N	N	
9 March 2026	20:00	POP	Uroš Slak	P Robert Golob	P Janez Janša	P Jernej Vrtovec	P Matjaž Han	P Luka Mesec	N	P Zoran Stevanović	P Jasmin Feratović	N	P Anže Logar	N	N	N	N	N	
9 March 2026	20:00	RTV	Tadeja Anžlovar; Vita Vlašič	N	N	N	N	N	P Vlado Dimovski	S Sabina Senčar	S Leon Božič	P Zmago Jelinčič Plemeniti	N	N	N	N	N	S Katerina Vidner Ferko	
11 March 2026	17:00	Radio Prvi	Alenka Terlep; Lucija Dimnik	S Tereza Novak	N	P Jernej Vrtovec	P Matjaž Han	P Luka Mesec	N	P Zoran Stevanović	P Jasmin Feratović	N	S Luka Mihalič	S Irena Kuntarič Hribar	N	N	N	P Violeta Tomić	
11 March 2026	20:00	Nova24	Aleksander Rant	A	S Alenka Forte	P Tina Bregant	A	A	N	N	N	N	S Tadej Ostrc	N	N	N	N	N	
12 March 2026	19:00	AIDEA	Klemen Selakovič	P Robert Golob	P Janez Janša	N	N	N	N	N	N	N	N	N	N	N	N	N	
12 March 2026	20:00	RTV	Tanja Starič; Marko Milenković	S Klemen Boštjančič	S Polona Rifelj	P Marko Lotrič	S Matevž Frangež	S Igor Feketija	N	N	N	N	S Igor Masten	P Vladimir Prebilič	P Miha Kordiš	N	P Karl Erjavec	N	
16 March 2026	20:00	POP	Petra Kerčmar	P Robert Golob	P Janez Janša	N	N	N	N	N	N	N	N	N	N	N	N	N	
16 March 2026	20:00	RTV	Katarina Veselič Golob; Nejc Furlan	N	N	N	N	N	P Vlado Dimovski	S Martel Antoni Santinni	P Jasmin Feratović	P Zmago Jelinčič Plemeniti	N	N	N	N	N	P Boris Žulj	
18 March 2026	17:00	Radio Ognjišče	Alen Salihović; Tanja Dominko	P Robert Golob	P Janez Janša	P Jernej Vrtovec	A	P Uroš Macerl	N	P Zoran Stevanović	P Jasmin Feratović	N	P Anže Logar	P Vladimir Prebilič	N	N	N	N	
18 March 2026	17:00	Radio Prvi	Nataša Mulec; Tomaž Cestina	S Urška Klakočar Zupančič	A	S Janez Cigler Kralj	S Andreja Katič	P Asta Vrečko	P Vlado Dimovski	S Katja Kokot	P Jasmin Feratović	P Zmago Jelinčič Plemeniti	S Tadej Ostrc	P Vladimir Prebilič	P Miha Kordiš	N	N	P Jure Pogačnik	
18 March 2026	–	N1	Miha Orešnik	N	N	P Jernej Vrtovec	P Matjaž Han	P Luka Mesec	N	N	N	N	P Anže Logar	N	N	N	N	N	
19 March 2026	20:00	RTV	Manica J. Ambrožič	P Robert Golob	P Janez Janša	P Jernej Vrtovec	P Matjaž Han	P Luka Mesec	N	N	N	N	P Anže Logar	P Vladimir Prebilič	P Miha Kordiš	N	P Karl Erjavec	N	
20 March 2026	20:00	POP	Petra Kerčmar	P Robert Golob	P Janez Janša	P Jernej Vrtovec	P Matjaž Han	P Luka Mesec	N	P Zoran Stevanović	P Jasmin Feratović	N	P Anže Logar	P Vladimir Prebilič	N	N	N	N	

=== Interviews ===
The weekly programme Pogovori o prihodnosti was hosted by Tomaž Vesel. It aired on Mondays at 9:00 p.m. on TV Veseljak Golica, on Tuesdays at 8:30 p.m. on TV Aktual, and on Sundays at 9:30 p.m. on Radio 1 TV. The programme consisted of a series of thirteen interviews with the leaders of political parties. In addition to its traditional large-scale election debates, POP TV also produced eight weekly interviews with party leaders as part of the 24UR news programme. The paired interviews were conducted by journalists from the evening news team Žana Vertačnik, Anže Božič, Marko Gregorc, and Kaja Kobetič, as well as journalists from the 24ur.com portal, including Urša Zupan, Mirko Vorkapić, Natalija Švab, and Maruša Slana.

As part of the evening current affairs programme Odmevi on TV SLO 1, profiles of political parties were broadcast between 3 and 16 February 2026. These profiles focused on parties polling above two percent in public opinion surveys ahead of the upcoming elections and consisted of nine approximately fifteen-minute interviews with party leaders, prepared and conducted by the programme's hosts. In February 2026, the online portal Domovina aired the podcast Volitve 2026, hosted by Vida Petrovčič. The series presented centrist and centre-right political parties and focused on themes described as being "more oriented towards the survival, future, and development of Slovenia."

== Endorsements ==
Robert Golob (GS)

Heads of state and government, EU officials

- Valerie Hayer, Leader of the Renew Europe

Parties

- Renew Europe
Janez Janša (SDS)

Heads of state and government, EU officials

- Manfred Weber, President of the European People's Party (co-endorsement with NSi + SLS + FOKUS)
- Milorad Dodik, President of Republika Srpska

Parties

- European People's Party (co-endorsement with NSi + SLS + FOKUS)
Jernej Vrtovec (SA)

Heads of state and government, EU officials

- Manfred Weber, President of the European People's Party (co-endorsement with SDS)

Parties

- European People's Party (co-endorsement with SDS)
Matjaž Han (SD)

Heads of state and government, EU officials

- Iratxe Garcia Perez, Leader of the Progressive Alliance of Socialists and Democrats

Parties

- Progressive Alliance of Socialists and Democrats
Anže Logar (DEM)

Former executive branch officials

- Marko Bandelli, former Minister for Cohesion and Regional Development of Slovenia

== Opinion polls ==
LOESS curve of polling conducted, excluding undecided voters

Opinion polling for the next Slovenian parliamentary election is being carried out continually by various organisations to gauge voting intention. The dates for these opinion polls range from the 2022 Parliamentary election on 24 April to the present day.

=== Polling aggregations ===
Polling aggregator	Last update	GS	SDS	NSi	SLS	FOKUS	SD	Levica	Vesna	RES	PIR	SNS	DEM	PVP	MI!	GU	Lead
2026 Election	22 March 2026	28.7; 29	27.9; 28	9.3; 9			6.7; 6	5.6; 5		5.5; 5	2.4; 0	2.3; 0	6.7; 6	3.1; 0	0.5; 0	0.4; 0	0.8
Odmev	22 March 2026	24.9	26.0	9.1			8.2	7.8		5.6	–	–	7.1	–	–	–	1.1
PolitPro	22 March 2026	23.6	27.8	7.6			8.1	7.4		4.1	2.6	2.2	1.9	3.0	1.2	0.8	4.2
Politico	20 March 2026	26	26	8			8	8		4	3	2	7	3	–	–	Tie
Europe Elects	19 March 2026	25	28	–			8	8		4	–	–	7	3	–	–	3
2022 parliamentary election	24 April 2022	34.5; 41	23.5; 27	6.9; 8	3.4; 0	–	6.7; 7	4.5; 5	1.4; 0	2.9; 0	1.6; 0	1.5; 0	–	–	–	–	11

=== Exit poll ===
Below is listed Mediana's demographic breakdown.

Breakdown of vote into affiliates (%) by demographic
Category	GS	SDS	NSi + SLS + FOKUS	SD	Levica + Vesna	DEM	RES	Others	Margin
All	29.9	27.5	9.4	6.7	6.3	5.9	5.2	9.0	2.4
Gender
Female	32.5	23.7	9.6	6.8	7.7	5.9	4.6	–	8.8
Male	26.2	27.7	9.5	7.0	6.1	7.1	6.6	–	1.5
Age
18–24	16.8	25.5	13.4	6.0	8.5	8.3	8.9	–	8.7
25–44	21.7	25.6	11.3	4.0	7.5	8.7	8.9	–	3.9
45–64	30.1	26.5	9.4	5.0	7.0	5.7	4.8	–	3.6
65+	42.0	24.5	6.5	9.5	5.7	3.9	1.4	–	17.5
Education
Primary school	29.2	33.8	8.9	5.6	3.9	4.6	4.6	–	4.6
Secondary school	29.4	29.8	8.5	6.1	4.9	5.7	6.7	–	0.4
University	30.2	19.9	10.8	8.0	9.6	7.2	4.4	–	10.3

== Results ==
The election resulted in a hung parliament, with no major party being likely to secure a majority of 46 seats. Freedom Movement (GS) received 28.63% of the vote, while the opposition Slovenian Democratic Party (SDS) received 27.95% of the vote, creating a gap of 0.68 percentage points, the smallest margin ever between the top two parties in a Slovenian parliamentary election. With GS and SDS winning 29 and 28 seats respectively, the left-leaning bloc led by Golob decreased to 40 MPs and the right-leaning bloc led by Janša increased to 43 MPs.

In third place was the right-wing coalition of New Slovenia, Slovenian People's Party and FOKUS taking 9.29% of the vote and winning a total of nine seats (NSi won 7 seats, SLS won 1 seat and Focus won 1 seat). The Social Democrats and Democrats each took around 6.70% of the vote, giving both parties their respective six seats. Left–Vesna took five seats (The Left won all 5 seats) with 5.58% of the vote, while Resni.ca also took five seats with 5.52% of the vote. Zoran Stevanović, leader of Resni.ca, stated that the party was not interested in joining the right-leaning bloc led by Janša.

Party	Votes	%	Seats	+/–
Freedom Movement	338,102	28.66	29	–12
Slovenian Democratic Party	328,923	27.88	28	+1
Together in Action	109,201	9.26	9	+1
Social Democrats	79,175	6.71	6	–1
Democrats	78,902	6.69	6	New
Levica and Vesna	67,183	5.69	5	0
Resni.ca	64,799	5.49	5	+5
Prerod – Party of Vladimir Prebilič	35,976	3.05	0	New
Pirate Party	27,811	2.36	0	0
Slovenian National Party	26,375	2.24	0	0
We, Socialists!	5,657	0.48	0	New
Greens of Slovenia and Party of Generations	5,277	0.45	0	0
Alternative for Slovenia	4,785	0.41	0	0
Voice of Pensioners	4,193	0.36	0	New
Karl Erjavec – Trust Party	2,995	0.25	0	New
Unity	251	0.02	0	0
Solution – Party of Pensioners Velenje	164	0.01	0	New
Italian and Hungarian national minorities			2	0
Total	1,179,769	100.00	90	0
Valid votes	1,179,769	99.07		
Invalid/blank votes	11,050	0.93		
Total votes	1,190,819	100.00		
Registered voters/turnout	1,695,220	70.25		
Source: dvk-rs.si

=== Constituency results ===
The SDS prevailed in five constituencies out of eight, winning in Celje, as well as Kranj, Novo Mesto and Ptuj, where they secured their best result at 32.67% of the vote. The party also secured Maribor, Slovenia's second-largest city, with 30.75% of the vote. Conversely, the GS won the capital districts of Ljubljana Bežigrad and Ljubljana Center, as well as Postojna, where they recorded their best result at 34.79% of the vote. The GS's performance represented a decline from their 2022 result, when they won all eight constituencies; however, they still secured a plurality of seats in three electoral districts: Ljubljana Center, Ljubljana Bežigrad and Novo Mesto. Conversely, the SDS won their pluralities in Ptuj and Celje, while the two parties won an even amount of delegates in Postojna, Maribor and Kranj.

Constituency	GS		SDS		SA		SD		Democrats		LV		Resni.ca		Others	
Constituency	Votes	%	Votes	%	Votes	%	Votes	%	Votes	%	Votes	%	Votes	%	Votes	%
Celje	39,450	26.36	46,705	31.60	15,508	10.39	11,373	7.62	10,166	6.81	6,128	4.11	7,676	5.14	12,328	8.26
Kranj	39,132	26.10	41,554	27.71	16,765	11.18	8,028	5.35	9,950	6.64	8,797	5.87	10,554	7.04	15,164	10.10
Ljubljana Bežigrad	43,082	29.18	38,279	25.93	12,768	8.65	8,662	5.87	9,936	6.73	10,287	6.97	7,792	5.28	16,834	11.41
Ljubljana Center	46,234	29.12	37,529	23.64	13,883	8.74	9,859	6.21	11,596	7.30	15,126	9.53	7,392	4.66	17,162	10.80
Maribor	39,037	28.33	42,471	30.83	9,782	7.10	9,375	6.80	9,686	7.03	6,406	4.65	8,092	5.87	12,926	9.38
Novo Mesto	41,423	27.74	43,928	29.42	15,330	10.27	12,171	8.15	9,160	6.13	5,905	3.95	7,100	4.75	14,303	9.57
Postojna	47,962	34.74	31,136	22.55	12,610	9.13	10,199	7.39	7,791	5.64	8,239	5.97	6,793	4.92	13,319	9.65
Ptuj	37,763	27.80	44,434	32.71	11,740	8.64	8,636	6.36	9,748	7.18	4,199	3.09	8,973	6.61	10,334	7.61
Total	333,973	28.63	326,036	27.95	108,386	9.29	78,303	6.71	78,033	6.69	65,087	5.58	64,372	5.52	110,204	9.44
Source: DVK

Maps
The GS's performance by constituency

The SDS's performance by constituency

The NSI-SLS-Fokus's performance by constituency

=== Turnout ===
==== Early voting ====
Day	Voters	%	Ref
Tuesday, 17 March	24,559	1.4	
Wednesday, 18 March	29,652	1.7	
Thursday, 19 March	27,494	1.6	
Total	81.705	4.8	

==== Election day ====
Time	Voters	%	Ref
Until 11am (Note: Does not include early voting.)	362.383	21.38	
Until 4pm	859.909	50.73	
Until 4pm (Note: Also includes early voting.)	941.614	55.53	
Total turnout	1.190.819	70.25	

==== Turnout by electoral districts ====
Electoral district	Eligible voters	Turnout	2026 turnout	2022 turnout	Change
Kranj	208,965	150,564	72.05 %	74.14 %	▼2.09 %
Postojna	209,323	137,970	65.91 %	69.56 %	▼3.65 %
Ljubljana – Center	221,718	158,219	71.36 %	75.26 %	▼3.90 %
Ljubljana – Bežigrad	210,021	143,482	68.32 %	73.63 %	▼4.31 %
Celje	210,609	149,449	70.96 %	71.61 %	▼0.65 %
Novo Mesto	217,947	149,244	68.48 %	70.36 %	▼1.88 %
Maribor	206,707	138,193	66.85 %	67.94 %	▼1.09 %
Ptuj	209,914	136,010	64.79 %	65.13 %	▼0.34 %

== Aftermath ==
=== Government formation ===
Following the election, prime minister Robert Golob said that he would try to create a government of national unity and invited all parties, except SDS, for coalition talks. This offer was rejected by NSi and its partners, the Slovenian People's Party and Focus of Marko Lotrič. Leaders of the Democrats and Resni.ca stated that they do not want to be in a government together with The Left.

On 1 April, the leaders of Democrats, Resni.ca and NSi announced that their intention to form a centre-right coalition or a "third bloc" in anticipation of imminent post-election coalition talks. This third bloc would hold 20 seats in the National Assembly and would further complicate the path to a government formation. The leader of Resni.ca, Zoran Stevanović, stated that his party would not support any government led by Janez Janša or Robert Golob, stating his preference for a repeat snap election. Despite this, Golob called for the will of the voters to be respected and expressed enthusiasm that the next government would be led by his party. Anže Logar, the leader of the Democrats called for Golob to announce a ministry allocation proposal.

On 7 April, Golob announced allocations of ministries in the proposed national unity government: seven for Freedom Movement, three for NSi-led coalition and two for SD, Democrats and The Left each. He also expected external cooperation with Resni.ca on some topics. The offer was rejected by NSi-led coalition. Golob also proposed individual coalition talks with these parties.

On 10 April, Resni.ca leader Zoran Stevanović was elected speaker of the National Assembly after being nominated by Resni.ca, SDS and NSi MPs. GS announced that they voted against him, while The Left and SD abstained.

Candidate	Votes	Yes	No	Invalid
Zoran Stevanović	79	48	29	2

On 12 April, newsletter Dnevnik reported that at least two MPs from the Democrats had worries about possible Janša-led government. Leader of the Democrats, Anže Logar, later stated that his party is unified and that the GS is still the only party that invited them for coalition talks.

On 17 April, Anže Logar officially stated that his party is leaving coalition talks with GS, because GS attempted to negotiate with individual MPs to cross the floor. Robert Golob responded by accusing Logar and Stevanović of cheating their own voters by giving fake pre-election promises of not entering a government led by Janša and by only pretending to have real interest in forming a possible second government led by GS. Furthermore, Golob released documents from coalition negotiations, where GS promised to fulfill all main points of the pre-election programme of the Democrats.

On 20 April, Golob admitted that he could not form a government and said that his party would go into opposition.

On 21 April, Freedom Movement announced that they were filing a constitutional complaint regarding the election of the speaker, asserting that a number of ballots used in the speakership election were visibly marked, which would allegedly be a violation of national deputies’ right to the fairness of a secret vote in the speakership election.

On 25 April, president Nataša Pirc Musar stated after finishing personal consultations with all leaders of elected parties that she would not nominate someone for prime minister, because no one reached the required minimum of 46 votes. She also said that these personal consultations had no trust, respect or honesty and that she sees a lot of changes in positions and behavior of parties after the election.

On 6 May, a new round of coalition talks were initiated by Janša, who seeks to form a coalition with NSi-SLS-FOKUS, the Democrats and Resni.ca. Although Speaker Stevanović reaffirmed that his party wouldn't join a coalition, he stated that it would "support a candidate with widespread support". However, SDS later said it did not intend to continue negotiations. If no agreement is reached on a new prime ministerial candidate, fresh elections will be held.

On 16 May, Stevanović publicly announced that Resni.ca will externally support Janez Janša for prime minister, making his fourth government possible.

On 19 May, 48 MPs endorsed Janez Janša for Prime Minister. On the same day, an MP from Resni.ca, Katja Kokot, accused left-leaning MPs of attempting to bribe MPs from Resni.ca with seven figures bribes, in order to thwart the creation of the fourth Janša government. However she did not name any concrete names or support any evidence to her claims.

On 22 May, Janša was sworn in as Prime Minister. He received 51 votes in a secret ballot in the parliament, which came as surprise, because at least 1 opposition MP must have voted for Janša.

=== International responses ===
Heads of government and heads of state congratulating Janša on his election included Italian prime minister Giorgia Meloni, Croatian prime minister Andrej Plenković, Czech prime minister Andrej Babiš, Ukrainian prime minister Yulia Svyrydenko, Kosovar prime minister Albin Kurti, Israeli prime minister Benjamin Netanyahu, Austrian chancellor Christian Stocker, Montenegrin prime minister Milojko Spajićand North Macedonian prime minister Hristijan Mickoski.

Other politicians and political parties to congratulate Janša included Matteo Salvini, leader of Italy's Northern League and deputy prime minister, Sviatlana Tsikhanouskaya, leader of Belarus's opposition, Mateusz Morawiecki, former Polish prime minister, president of the European People's Party Manfred Weber, and Milorad Dodik, the former Serb member of the Presidency of Bosnia and Herzegovina.

The European Commission president Ursula von der Leyen, European Council president Antonio Costa and European Parliament president Roberta Metsola all congratulated Janša and expressed wishes towards building a strong European Union.

== See also ==
- List of members of the 10th National Assembly of Slovenia
