= Levica and Vesna =

Alliance of two Slovenian political parties

Levica and Vesna Levica in Vesna
- Leader: Luka Mesec
- Co-coordinators: Asta Vrečko; Luka Mesec; Urša Zgojznik; Uroš Macerl
- Founded: 17 June 2025
- Dissolved: 22 July 2026
- Merger of: The Left; Vesna – Green Party
- Ideology: Progressivism; Green politics Democratic socialism
- Political position: Centre-left to left-wing
- European affiliation: Party of the European Left; European Green Party
- European Parliament group: The Left in the European Parliament – GUE/NGL; Greens–European Free Alliance
- Colors: Red; Green
- National Assembly: 5 / 90
- European Parliament: 1 / 9 (Note: Vladimir Prebilič was elected on the ballot of the Vesna - Green Party, although he later formed his own party Prerod - Party of Vladimir Prebilič, he is still the Vesna MEP.)
- Mayors: 1 / 212
- Municipal councillors: 28 / 2,750

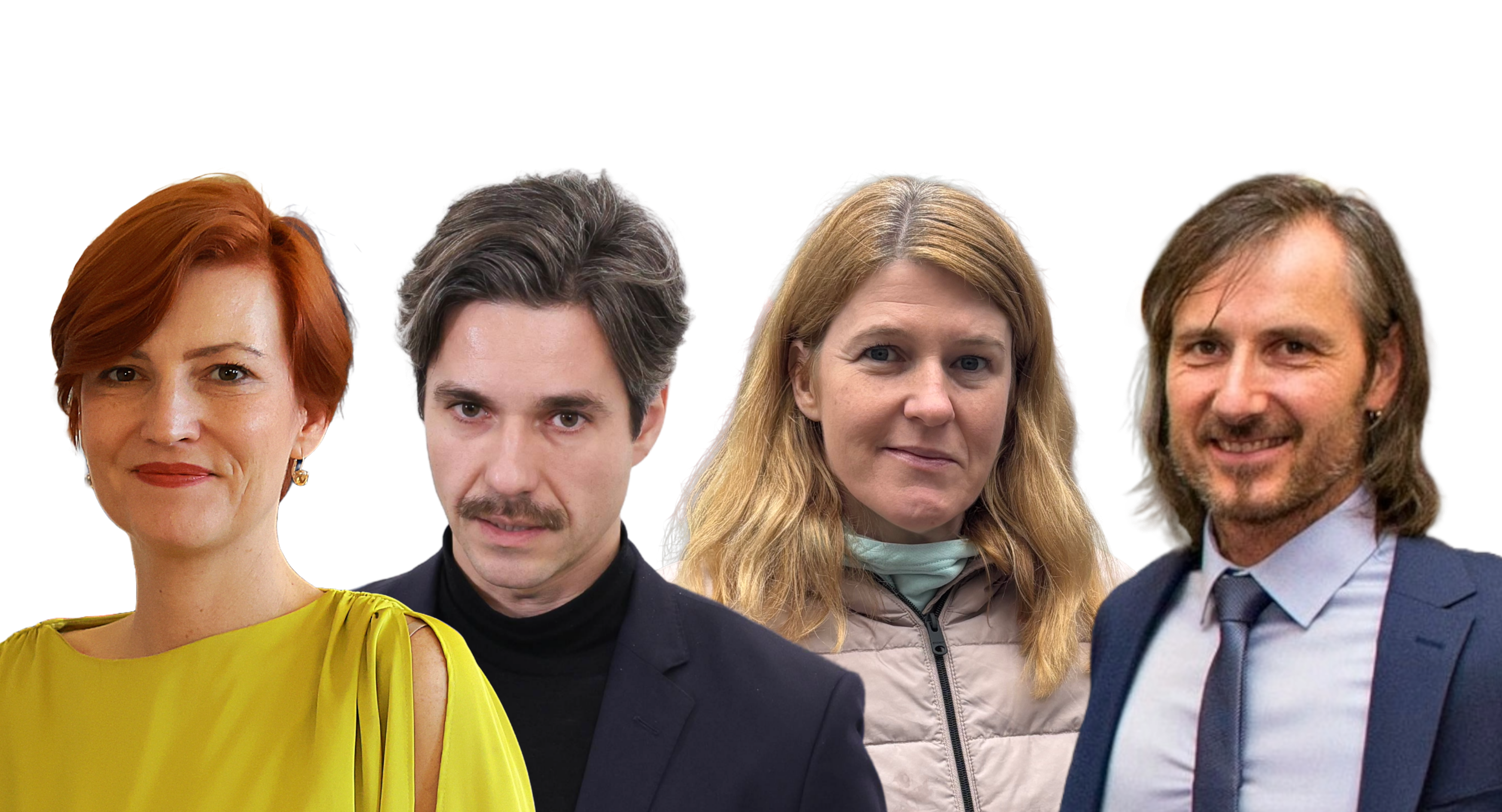
Representatives of the Levica and Vesna coalition. From left to right: Asta Vrečko, Luka Mesec, Urška Zgojznik, Uroš Macerl

Levica and Vesna was an alliance of two Slovenian political parties that contested the 2026 Slovenian parliamentary election. It is composed of The Left and Vesna – Green Party, which signed an official agreement on electoral cooperation on 17 June 2025.

== History ==
In March 2025, representatives of Levica and Vesna began talks on possible cooperation. According to Vesna co-president Urša Zgojznik, the main basis for the alliance was green politics, which both parties share. The search for alliances was further encouraged by the departure of prominent Levica member Miha Kordiš, who announced and later founded the new socialist party We, Socialists!.

The council of Levica approved the cooperation at its session on 15 June 2025. On 17 June 2025, the two parties signed a pre-election agreement announcing their joint participation in the upcoming elections.

At Levica's electoral congress on 4 October, participation in the alliance was officially confirmed by the party. The partner cooperation was also confirmed by Vesna at a council meeting on 14 October. In October 2025, talks were announced on cooperation in this coalition with the newly established mayors' party Community, which later decided not to run in the election.

Levica's electoral congress, at which Asta Vrečko and Luka Mesec announced their joint candidacy, concluded on 14 November, when both were confirmed as co-coordinators. On 15 November 2025, Vesna held its electoral congress in Kranj, at which Urša Zgojznik and Uroš Macerl were reconfirmed as co-presidents.

In December 2025, public calls circulated arguing that the Levica–Vesna coalition should unite with We, Socialists! and the Pirate Party of Slovenia into a "Progressive Front", supposedly to achieve a better result in the National Assembly election. The main advocate of such cooperation was Jaša Jenull, a liberal political activist and leader of the Friday protests during the government of Janez Janša. The Left responded and denied the idea, due to their candidates already being selected.

In the 2026 Slovenian parliamentary election, the electoral alliance returned five members of parliament, all of whom were from Levica. Immediately following the election, Levica's co-coordinator Luka Mesec announced an intention to formally merge the two parties.

In July 2026, speculation emerged regarding friction between the two parties, noting the absence of Vesna representatives at the announcement of Mesec's candidacy for the Mayor of Ljubljana in the November 2026 local elections. On 22 July 2026, the leadership of Vesna requested that the joint parliamentary group drop "Vesna" from its name, citing insufficient involvement in the formation of the group's positions and inadequate emphasis on environmental policy. On 23 July 2026, Levica accepted Vesna's request and changed the name of the joint parliamentary group to simply "Levica".

== Ideology and programme ==
The coalition combines the democratic socialist principles of Levica with the environmental and sustainability orientation of Vesna. Its key programme points include:

- Climate justice and an accelerated green transition
- Strengthening public healthcare and education
- Workers' rights and social security
- Participatory democracy and transparency
- Feminist and inclusive policies

== Partners ==
Political parties		Ideology	Co-coordinators presidents		
Political parties		Ideology	Co-coordinators presidents	National Assembly	MEPs
Levica	Levica	Democratic socialism	Asta Vrečko; Luka Mesec	5 / 90	0 / 9
Vesna	Vesna – Green Party	Green politics	Urša Zgojznik; Uroš Macerl	0 / 90	1 / 9 (Note: Vladimir Prebilič was elected on the ballot of the Vesna - Green Party, although he later formed his own party Prerod - Party of Vladimir Prebilič, he is still the Vesna MEP.)

== Parliamentary election ==
Election	No. of votes	%	+/–	Seats	+/–	Position	Government
2026	67,183	5.69	Steady	5 / 90	Steady	6th	TBD
