= 2022 Slovenian presidential election =

- 23 October 2022 (first round); 13 November 2022 (second round)
- Turnout: 51.73% (first round); 53.59% (second round)
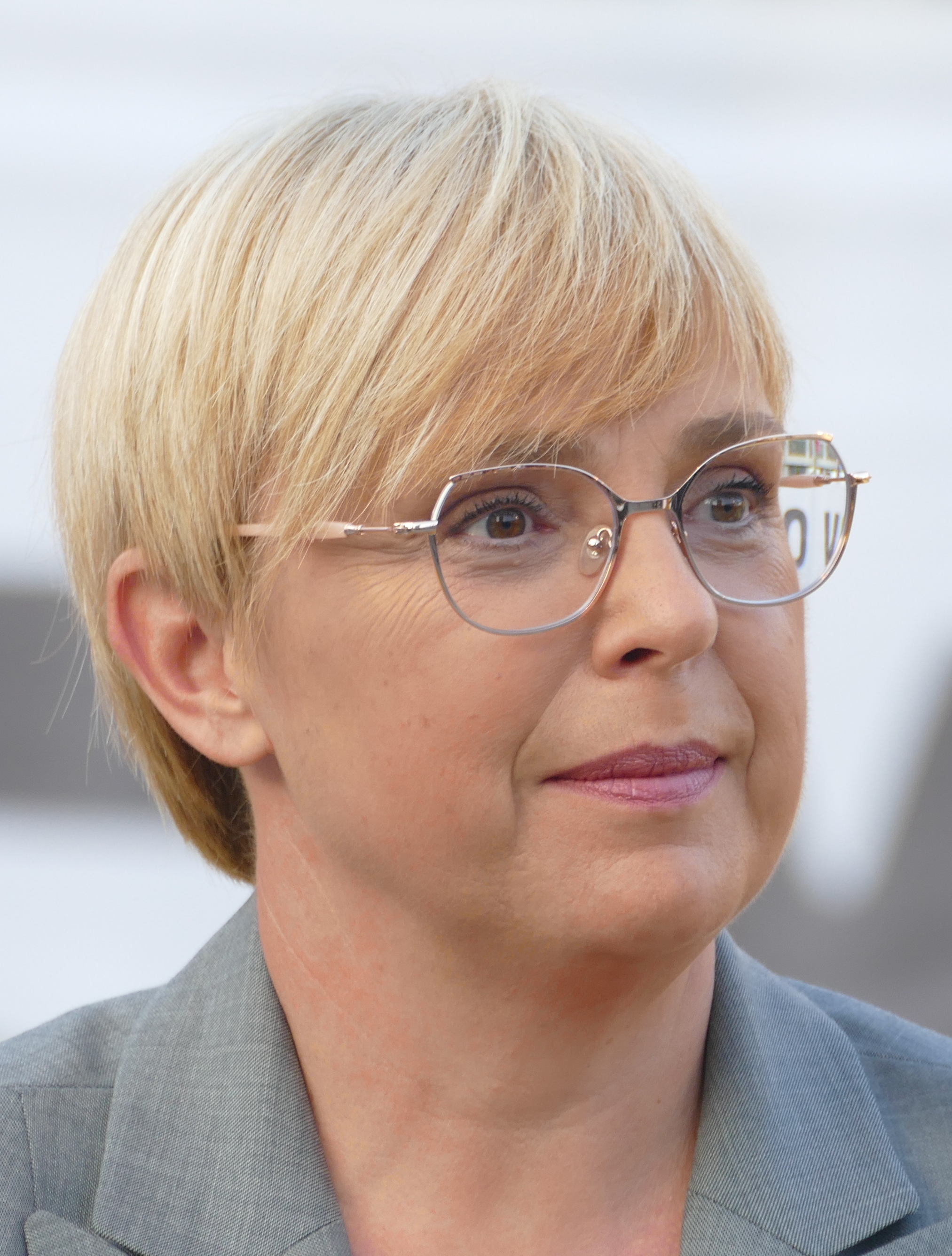

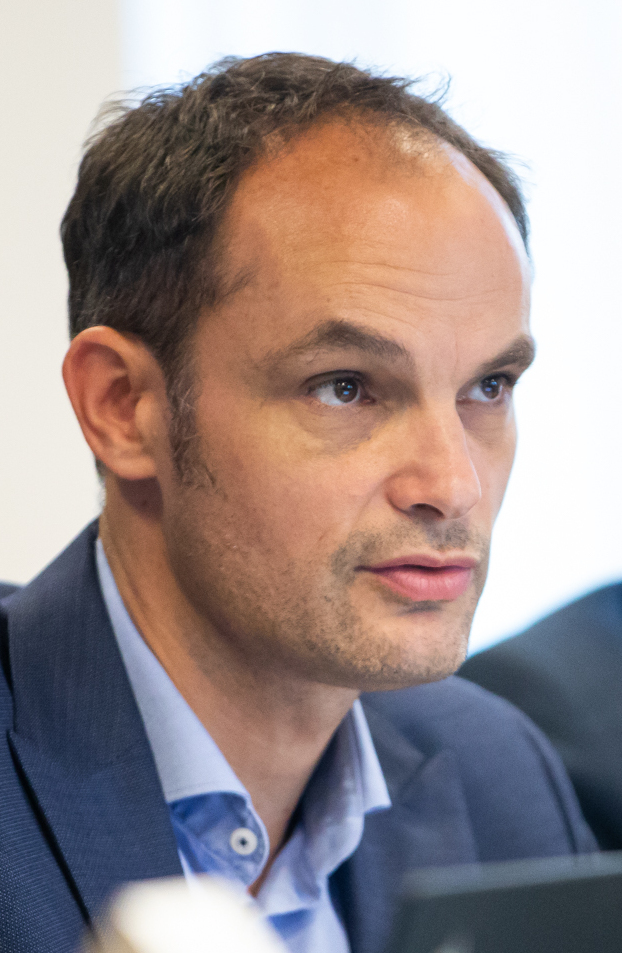
Nominee	Nataša Pirc Musar	Anže Logar
Party	Independent (Note: Endorsed by the Pirati and the SMS-Z.)	Independent (Note: Endorsed by the SDS and the SLS.)
Popular vote	483,812	414,029
Percentage	53.89%	46.11%
President before election
Borut Pahor
Independent
Elected President
Nataša Pirc Musar
Independent

Presidential elections were held in Slovenia on 23 October 2022. Incumbent President Borut Pahor was ineligible to run for a third consecutive term due to term limits.

As no candidate received a majority of the vote, a runoff between the top two placing candidates, former foreign minister Anže Logar, an SDS member running as an independent, and independent former Information Commissioner Nataša Pirc Musar, took place on 13 November 2022. Pirc Musar won the runoff with 53.86% of the vote, becoming the first female president of Slovenia.

Logar acknowledged his defeat and congratulated Pirc Musar on her victory.

== Important dates ==
Date	Election task
20 July 2022	President of the National Assembly announces elections
22 August 2022	Day the electoral tasks start
22 September 2022	Start of the official campaign
28 September 2022	Deadline for submitting candidacies
3 October 2022	Last day for withdrawing from the candidature
21 October 2022	Start of the electoral silence at midnight
23 October 2022	Election day
13 November 2022	Second round

== Electoral system ==
The President of Slovenia is elected using the two-round system; if no candidate receives a majority of the vote in the first round, the top two candidates contest a runoff.

Under Slovenia's election law, candidates for president are required to meet one of three criteria:

- The support of ten members of the National Assembly
- The support of one or more political parties and either three members of the National Assembly or signatures from 3,000 voters
- Signatures from 5,000 voters

Each political party could support only one candidate.

== Candidates ==
- Nataša Pirc Musar is a former president of the Slovenian Red Cross, a prominent human rights lawyer and was head of the data protection agency.. She stands for a center-left government and a pro-European Union policy. In view of Russo-Ukrainian War, she believed that Russia broke international law. Pirc Musar ran as an independent, but her campaign was supported by two former presidents, Milan Kučan and Danilo Türk as well as the Pirate party.
- Anže Logar was a longtime member of the Slovenian Democratic Party (SDS) and a former Foreign Minister. He chose to officially be an independent candidate which was viewed as a distancing himself from the ousted government.
- Milan Brglez was a candidate of the Social Democrats (SD) supported by the Freedom Movement, and incumbent prime minister Robert Golob.

=== Advanced to runoff ===
Candidate name, age, political party		Candidate of	#	Political offices	Campaign	Registration date	Ref.
Anže Logar (50); Independent	Anže Logar	SDS	2	Member of the National Assembly (2014–2020); Minister of Foreign Affairs (2020–2022)	(Campaign • Website)	22 Sep 2022	
Anže Logar (50); Independent	Anže Logar	SLS	2	Member of the National Assembly (2014–2020); Minister of Foreign Affairs (2020–2022)	(Campaign • Website)	22 Sep 2022	
Nataša Pirc Musar (58); Independent	Nataša Pirc Musar	Pirati	5	Information Commissioner (2004–2014); President of the Slovenian Red Cross (2015–2016)	(Campaign • Website)	22 Sep 2022	
Nataša Pirc Musar (58); Independent	Nataša Pirc Musar	SMS–Z	5	Information Commissioner (2004–2014); President of the Slovenian Red Cross (2015–2016)	(Campaign • Website)	22 Sep 2022	

=== Did not advance to runoff ===
Candidate name, age, political party		Candidate of	No.	Political offices	Campaign	Registration date	Ref.
Milan Brglez (59); SD	Milan Brglez	SD	1	Speaker of the National Assembly (2014–2018); Member of the European Parliament (2019–present)	(Campaign • Website)	29 Sep 2022	
Milan Brglez (59); SD	Milan Brglez	GS	1	Speaker of the National Assembly (2014–2018); Member of the European Parliament (2019–present)	(Campaign • Website)	29 Sep 2022	
Janez Cigler Kralj (47); N.Si	Janez Cigler Kralj	N.Si	3	Minister of Labour (2020–2022); Member of the National Assembly (2022–present)	(Campaign • Website)	22 Sep 2022	
Miha Kordiš (37); Levica	Miha Kordiš	Levica	4	Member of the National Assembly (2014–present)	(Campaign)	29 Sep 2022	
Vladimir Prebilič (52); Independent	Vladimir Prebilič	Vesna	6	Mayor of Kočevje (2010–present); Professor (defence studies)	(Campaign • Website)	22 Sep 2022	
Sabina Senčar (56); Resni.ca	Sabina Senčar	Resni.ca	7	None (gynaecologist)	(Campaign • Website)	29 Sep 2022	
Sabina Senčar (56); Resni.ca	Sabina Senčar	ZLS	7	None (gynaecologist)	(Campaign • Website)	29 Sep 2022	

== Opinion polls ==
=== Graph ===
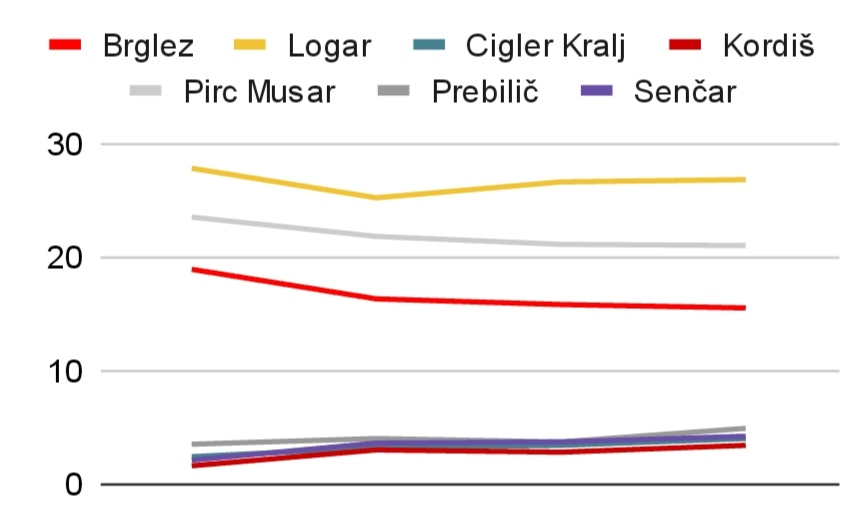
Graphical summary of the polling for the first round

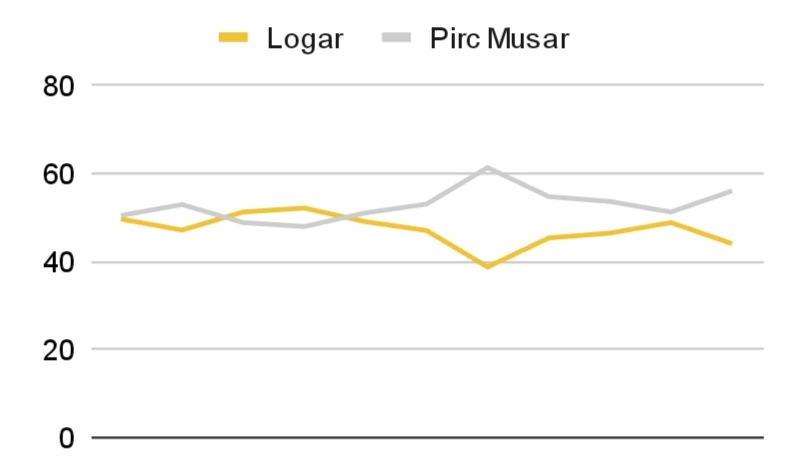
Graphical summary of the polling for the second round

=== First round ===
Polling firm	Fieldwork date	Sample size								Undecided	Abstain	Lead
Polling firm	Fieldwork date	Sample size	Brglez SD	Logar Ind.	Cigler Kralj N.Si	Kordiš Levica	Pirc Musar Ind.	Prebilič Ind.	Senčar Resni.ca	Undecided	Abstain	Lead
Election results	23 October 2022	—	15.5	34.0	4.4	2.8	26.9	10.6	5.9	—	—	7.1
Valicon/RTV Slovenija	18–21 Oct 2022	1,989	12.3	24.8	5.0	5.1	21.4	6.2	7.2	8.6	6.2	3.4
Mediana/POP TV/Delo	17–19 Oct 2022	824	17.3	30.1	6.6	5.4	20.5	10.7	4.0	2.4	0.7	9.6
Parsifal/Nova24TV	10–14 Oct 2022	705	10.7	27.1	4.0	2.9	19.9	3.2	4.8	16.8	5.2	7.2
Ninamedia/Večer/Dnevnik	10–13 Oct 2022	1,000	18.6	31.7	3.6	2.2	19.8	3.1	3.3	–	–	11.9
Mediana/Delo/POP TV	3–6 Oct 2022	719	15.3	23.6	4.2	4.9	20.4	4.6	6.0	13.6	1.2	3.2
Valicon/RTV Slovenija	28–30 Sep 2022	1,547	12.1	21.5	3.8	3.7	19.7	4.6	4.2	15.7	8.7	1.8
Ninamedia/Dnevnik/Večer	28–29 Sep 2022	1,000	18.9	28.2	3.3	1.6	23.6	4.6	2.9	16.6	–	4.6
Ninamedia/Mladina	27 Sep 2022	500	18.9	27.3	1.4	1.6	23.3	2.3	1.2	21.7	1.6	4.0

=== Second round ===
Polling firm	Fieldwork date	Sample size						
Polling firm	Fieldwork date	Sample size	Logar Ind.	Pirc Musar Ind.	Logar Ind.	Brglez SD	Pirc Musar Ind.	Brglez SD
Valicon/RTV Slovenija	9–11 Nov 2022	1860	44.0	56.0	–		–	
Ninamedia/Dnevnik/Večer	7–10 Nov 2022	1150	48.8	51.2	–		–	
Mediana/POP TV/Delo	7–9 Nov 2022	718	44.6	51.7	–		–	
Valicon/RTV Slovenija	2–4 Nov 2022	1,019	34.2	43.5	–		–	
Ninamedia/Mladina	27–29 Oct 2022	700	38.7	61.3	–		–	
Valicon/RTV Slovenija	18–21 Oct 2022	1,989	36.5	42.5	39.0	37.4	36.1	30.2
Mediana/POP TV/Delo	17–19 Oct 2022	824	42.4	44.4	45.2	43.7	34.4	38.3
Parsifal/Nova24TV	10–14 Oct 2022	705	49.2	45.1	50.2	40.5	–	
Ninamedia/Večer/Dnevnik	10–13 Oct 2022	1,000	39.6	37.3	41.3	33.6	–	
Valicon/RTV Slovenija	29–30 Sep 2022	1,547	33.9	40.7	37.0	32.0	33.7	29.4
Ninamedia/Dnevnik/Večer	28–29 Sep 2022	1,000	40.8	41.6	41.7	44.4	37.0	33.7

== Results ==
In the first round Anže Logar received 34% of the voter share against 27% for Nataša Pirc Musar. Milan Brglez was third with around 15%. For the second round Golob then turned his support to Pirc Musar.

In the run-off, independent Pirc Musar was expected to win since August 2022. Logar also ran as an independent, but was a member of the Slovenian Democratic Party (SDS), which lost parliamentary elections six months prior. Logar was therefore associated with Janša, who was accused with attempting to restrict the freedom of expression and undermine the independence of the judiciary during his term in office.

In the evening of 13 November 2022, the electoral commission reported that Pirc Musar won with nearly 54% of the vote, after which Logar conceded defeat and congratulated Pirc Musar on her victory. Pirc Musar will become Slovenia's first female president, commander-in-chief of the Slovenian Army and also be responsible for appointing the head of the Central Bank of Slovenia.

Candidate	Party	First round		Second round	
Candidate	Party	Votes	%	Votes	%
Anže Logar	Independent	296,000	33.95	414,029	46.11
Nataša Pirc Musar	Independent	234,361	26.88	483,812	53.89
Milan Brglez	Social Democrats	134,726	15.45		
Vladimir Prebilič	Independent	92,456	10.60		
Sabina Senčar	Resni.ca	51,767	5.94		
Janez Cigler Kralj	New Slovenia	38,113	4.37		
Miha Kordiš	The Left	24,518	2.81		
Total		871,941	100.00	897,841	100.00
Valid votes		871,941	99.47	897,841	98.87
Invalid/blank votes		4,625	0.53	10,224	1.13
Total votes		876,566	100.00	908,065	100.00
Registered voters/turnout		1,694,437	51.73	1,694,373	53.59
Source: Volitve
