= Skupaj v Akcijo =

Together in Action Skupaj v Akcijo
- Leader: Jernej Vrtovec
- Founders: Jernej Vrtovec; Tina Bregant; Marko Lotrič
- Founded: 21 January 2026
- Ideology: Christian democracy Conservatism
- Political position: Centre-right
- European affiliation: European People's Party
- European Parliament group: European People's Party Group
- Member parties: New Slovenia – Christian Democrats; Slovenian People's Party; Focus of Marko Lotrič
- National Assembly: 9 / 90
- European Parliament: 1 / 9
- Mayors: 11 / 212
- Municipal councillors: 442 / 2,750

Website
- www.skupajvakcijo.si (archived)

Together in Action' (Slovene: Skupaj v Akcijo, SA) is a centre-right alliance of three Slovenian political parties that contested the 2026 Slovenian parliamentary election. It is composed of New Slovenia (NSi), the Slovenian People's Party (SLS) and Fokus of Marko Lotrič (FOKUS), which signed an agreement to begin talks on cooperation on 19 November 2025.

After several weeks of negotiations, the joint electoral appearance was officially confirmed on 15 January 2026, when the number of candidate spots allocated to each party was also announced. The agreement on cooperation between the three parties on a joint list was signed by Jernej Vrtovec (NSi), Tina Bregant (SLS) and Marko Lotrič (FOKUS) on Wednesday, 21 January 2026. In the election, the coalition won nine seats, with seven seats won by New Slovenia candidates and one each by SLS and FOKUS candidates. After the election, the coalition, in cooperation with Democrats and Resni.ca, founded the Third Bloc due to its opposition to the Freedom Movement and the Slovenian Democratic Party as the relative winners of the election.

== History ==
=== Background of the alliance ===
One year after being elected a Member of the European Parliament, on 20 June 2025 the then-president of NSi, Matej Tonin, announced that he would not seek a new term at the head of the party. At the electoral congress on 13 September 2025, Jernej Vrtovec was elected the new president, and on 18 September he met for the first time with SLS president Tina Bregant. Both expressed support for cooperation and highlighted shared values in the field of economic policy, arguing that such cooperation would prevent the fragmentation of the centre-right vote and thereby make it easier to have "influence in shaping state-building policy."

On 8 October 2025, the main board of SLS confirmed that the party would go into the election as part of a development coalition. A decision was thus adopted to continue talks with NSi, as well as with Focus of Marko Lotrič and Democrats, led by Anže Logar. In an interview, Tina Bregant stressed the necessity of connecting programmatically similar parties, and also mentioned the Voice of Pensioners of Pavel Rupar as a potential partner. Pavel Rupar subsequently repeatedly rejected cooperation with NSi and SLS and announced that the pensioners' party would run independently.

On 19 November 2025, NSi, SLS and Fokus signed a declaration to begin talks for a joint appearance in the March 2026 parliamentary election. NSi president Jernej Vrtovec emphasized that "this trio gives hope for the formation of a development coalition, which is most possible within a centre-right government". SLS president Tina Bregant described the signing of the declaration as proof of maturity in overcoming differences while preserving the traditions and values of the parties. Fokus president Marko Lotrič described the alliance as a "new, stable and responsible developmental political alternative" aimed at forming a future development government, while all three parties would retain their identities. The cooperation of the three parties was also publicly welcomed by Janez Janša, the president of the SDS; in an interview he said that he was "keeping his fingers crossed that they manage to reach an agreement".

=== Inter-party negotiations ===
On 4 December 2025, Bregant and Lotrič confirmed that the three parties were already in the process of coordinating a joint list and the distribution of electoral districts. The executive board and council of NSi decided that the party would cede approximately 20 candidate spots to SLS and 10 to Fokus. At the same time, there were reportedly disputes over some districts; in the Škofja Loka 2 district, both Marko Lotrič and NSi MP Janez Žakelj were said to want to run, while for the Slovenska Bistrica district Ivan Žagar, a mayor from SLS, and Fokus secretary-general Monika Kirbiš Rojs were reportedly interested.

From the NSi quota, David Klobasa, mayor of Sveta Trojica v Slovenskih goricah, was also expected to be on the list, but not Matej Tonin. From the SLS quota, among others, the mayors Franc Rokavec (Litija), Srečko Ocvirk (Sevnica) and Franc Horvat (Tišina) were expected to run. Fokus, in turn, was to contribute, among others, sociologist Lea Furlan and sports psychologist Matej Tušak to the joint candidate list.

=== Confirmation of the candidate list ===
On 14 January 2026, Marko Lotrič and Monika Kirbiš Rojs announced that they would not run for MP on the joint list, as they wished to complete their term in the National Council; nevertheless, they announced their active participation in the election campaign.

During this period, the list was also finalized and cooperation confirmed. On 15 January it was announced that NSi would receive 49 places on the joint list, SLS 24 places and Fokus 15 places. Tina Bregant told the media that the negotiations with NSi had been difficult, but that the joint list would be "a compromise as good preparation for a joint appearance and future work". The agreement on the joint appearance was confirmed the same day by the main board of SLS and the council of the Fokus party. On 19 January, the agreement was also unanimously approved by the council of NSi, which was also acquainted with the party's candidates for the joint list. The NSi president accompanied the council's decision with the words that "only a development coalition is a true victory for the future for all".

The official agreement on the joint appearance was signed by the presidents of the three parties on Wednesday, 21 January 2026. Upon signing the agreement, they announced that they had "overcome past disagreements and are embarking on long-term cooperation" and promised stability and predictability.

On 5 February 2026, the council of the Focus of Marko Lotrič party and the main board of SLS approved the joint candidate list of the alliance at their respective meetings.

== Programme ==
The parties presented their programme on 17 February 2026, at which point they predicted a third-place finish and 15 parliamentary seats.

=== Economy and taxation ===
The policy guidelines were presented by Marko Lotrič. Emphasis was placed on reducing the tax burden on labour, simplifying the tax system and increasing the competitiveness of the economy. Among the central proposals is the gradual increase of the general income tax allowance from €5,620 to €8,000, with a further increase to €10,500 by 2029. The programme envisages the introduction of a simple and transparent lump-sum tax regime for entrepreneurs and the restoration of higher revenue thresholds for lump-sum taxpayers, whereby the limit of average annual revenue for full lump-sum taxpayers would rise from €120,000 to €150,000.

The parties also propose the introduction of the status of student sole proprietor and the removal of restrictions on pensioners working while retaining their full pension (the so-called double status). A reduction of the long-term care contribution from 2% to 1% for entrepreneurs and the abolition of this contribution for pensioners are also proposed. In the field of sick leave compensation, the programme envisages that the HIIS would cover compensation from the 7th day of absence for farmers and sole proprietors, and from the 20th day for all other employees.

=== Healthcare ===
The policy guidelines were presented by Tina Bregant. The healthcare programme announces a reform of the system with a strengthened role for public healthcare. A key priority is shortening waiting times by using all available capacities and introducing payment for healthcare services according to volume or achieved results. The programme envisages a clearer definition of rights under compulsory health insurance and the transformation of the HIIS into a more transparent and efficient health insurer. It also provides for the debureaucratisation of the system, the use of artificial intelligence for data analytics and the establishment of interconnected healthcare registries.

Special emphasis is placed on strengthening the primary level of health care, standardising information infrastructure and ensuring adequate equipment for service provision. Among the infrastructure projects, the parties announce the establishment of an academic quarter centre with the most advanced treatment methods, the organisation of functional helicopter emergency medical assistance across the entire country, the systemic regulation of palliative care, the start of construction of a new building for the Ljubljana University Medical Centre and the modernisation of the Maribor University Medical Centre.

=== Infrastructure and transport ===
The policy guidelines were presented by Jernej Vrtovec. The NSi, SLS, FOKUS programme in the field of infrastructure is based on the principle of "people before transit", prioritising the daily mobility of residents over freight traffic. Among the key projects is the establishment of a high-speed rail connection between Ljubljana and Maribor, with the goal of reducing travel time to less than one hour.

The programme also proposes the expansion of the main access roads into six-lane roads and the development of regional expressways to improve accessibility and traffic safety. It includes the establishment of a single decision-making centre for projects of national importance, which would accelerate the implementation of infrastructure investments. In the field of energy, the start of construction of the second unit of the Krško Nuclear Power Plant is announced.

=== Regional development ===
The policy guidelines were presented by Marko Lotrič. The parties' programme announced measures to reduce development disparities between different parts of the country; among the central proposals is the introduction of provinces, to which part of the competences and state funding would be transferred, with the aim of enabling more effective regional decision-making.

The guidelines include directing more European funds to less developed regions, relocating part of public services, including some ministries, from Ljubljana to other regions, and strengthening regional development centres. The parties advocate simplifying procedures for obtaining European funds and digitalising project applications.

=== Demography ===
The policy guidelines were presented by Jernej Vrtovec. NSi, SLS, FOKUS advocate improving conditions for young people and families and increasing housing accessibility, with the introduction of a 95-percent state guarantee for the purchase of a first home by young people; free kindergarten for all children is also envisaged.

The programme includes tax relief for families with children and the introduction of 12-month tax holidays upon first employment. In the field of education, changes to the school system are announced, with greater emphasis on developing critical thinking and practical skills such as computer and financial literacy.

=== Agriculture and the countryside ===
The policy guidelines were presented by Tina Bregant. The programme defines food security as a strategic goal of the state, with an emphasis on achieving at least 80-percent self-sufficiency in key food products. Reducing import dependence, promoting short food supply chains and prioritising the use of Slovenian food in public institutions are highlighted. The parties of the alliance support strengthening family farms, improving their position in the food chain and developing the forest-wood chain, which would increase added value and create new jobs in the countryside.

The programme includes the protection of fertile agricultural land from construction, the reduction of administrative and tax burdens and the strengthening of the social security of farmers. Investment in modern technologies, support for young farm successors and adaptation to climate change are also announced.

== Parties ==
Political parties		Ideology	President	MPs	
Political parties		Ideology	President	National Assembly	MEPs
NSi	New Slovenia – Christian Democrats	Christian democracy	Jernej Vrtovec	7 / 90	1 / 9
SLS	Slovenian People's Party	Agrarianism	Tina Bregant	1 / 90	0 / 9
FOKUS	Focus of Marko Lotrič	Conservatism	Marko Lotrič	1 / 90	0 / 9

== Election results ==
Election	No. of votes	%	+/–	Seats	+/–	Position	Government
2026	109,201	9.26	▲2.40	9 / 90	▲1	3rd	Coalition
