= Community – Union of Local Community Lists =

Community Skupnost
- President: Marko Funkl
- General Secretary: Rok Primožič
- Vice President: Tomaž Vencelj
- Founded: 26 August 2025
- Headquarters: TBA
- Ideology: Decentralization; Localism
- Political position: Centre
- Colours: Light Green
- National Assembly: 0 / 90
- European Parliament: 0 / 9
- Mayors: 7 / 212
- Municipal councillors: 53 / 2,750

Website
- slovenskaskupnost.org

Community – Union of Local Community Lists (Slovene: Skupnost – Zveza list lokalnih skupnosti; shortened Community, Slovene: Skupnost) is a Slovenian extra-parliamentary political party founded by Slovenian mayors, mostly connected in the Association of Independent Mayors. The founding congress took place in August 2025 in Idrija, with Marko Funkl elected as president.

== History ==
=== Background ===
On 8 January 2025, the Association of Independent Mayors was established, bringing together more than 32 mayors of various Slovenian municipalities. The president became Marko Funkl, mayor of Hrastnik, and upon its establishment, they announced their commitment to regulate the status and above all to present a united stance in the wider political space.

In July 2025, information circulated publicly that seven Slovenian mayors were preparing a new political party. The news was confirmed by Marko Funkl, the informal leader of the project. Those mentioned among the participants were Aleš Bržan, mayor of Koper, Tomaž Vencelj (Idrija), Nejc Smole (Medvode), Tine Radinja (Škofja Loka), Renata Kosec (Domžale) and Matija Kovač, mayor of Celje.

The founding congress took place on 26 August 2025, where Marko Funkl was elected president, Idrija mayor Tomaž Vencelj vice president, and Rok Primožič, head of the mayor’s office of Škofja Loka, general secretary. The final programme will be confirmed at a programme conference to be held in November. At the press conference, they emphasized the desire for cooperation and mentioned The Left, Vesna – Green Party, and the planned party of MEP Vladimir Prebilič as possible partners.

== Party bodies ==
- President: Marko Funkl
- Vice President: Tomaž Vencelj
- President of the Council: TBA
- General Secretary: Rok Primožič
- Executive Committee: TBA
- Party Council: TBA
