= Prerod =

Prerod – Party of Vladimir Prebilič Prerod – Stranka Vladimirja Prebiliča
- Abbreviation: PVP
- President: Vladimir Prebilič
- General Secretary: Brane Golubović
- Vice President: Klemen Grošelj
- Founded: 15 October 2025
- Split from: Vesna – Green Party
- Headquarters: Šubičeva 3 Ljubljana, Slovenia
- Ideology: Social liberalism Green liberalism Pro-Europeanism
- Political position: Centre-left
- European Parliament group: Greens–European Free Alliance
- Colours: Purple; Magenta; Green
- National Assembly: 0 / 90
- European Parliament: 1 / 9
- Mayors: 0 / 212
- Municipal council: 0 / 2,750

Website
- prerod.si

Prerod – Party of Vladimir Prebilič (Slovene: Prerod – Stranka Vladimirja Prebiliča, lit. 'Rebirth' or 'Renaissance'; PVP) is a Slovenian political party founded in October 2025 by current MEP and former mayor of Kočevje Vladimir Prebilič, who currently serves as its president. The party positions itself roughly in the centre-left of the political spectrum and emphasizes moderation, political integrity, social and institutional reform, and cooperation beyond traditional polarization.

== History ==
=== Founding ===
After 2024 European parliament elections there was speculation, about political future of Vladimir Prebilič, due to the party Vesna receiving a respectable 10% and gaining one seat, Prebilič. On 15 October 2025, Prerod was officially founded during its inaugural congress in Kočevje, where Prebilič was unanimously elected as the party’s first president. At the congress, the party approved its name, graphical identity (featuring a stylized linden sapling in green and violet), statute, and foundational program. It also elected core party organs and laid out initial leadership positions.

=== Early reactions and controversies ===
Because Prebilič was elected as a Member of the European Parliament (MEP) on the Vesna party list, the Vesna leadership called on him to return or resign his MEP mandate, arguing that he was elected under their banner and should not continue to represent them after forming a new party. Prebilič responded that he would relinquish his MEP seat only if and when he assumes a new incompatible office per the law.

In reaction to some of Prebilič’s statements, The Left expressed criticism, especially regarding remarks perceived as exclusionary; they and Vesna urged clarity and political responsibility from the new party.

== Ideology and platform ==
Prerod presents itself as a pro-reform, moderate left-of-centre party aiming to transcend the binary divide in Slovenian politics.

Some of its five foundational pillars outlined by Prebilič include:

1. Ensuring public safety (without promoting militaristic escalation)
2. Reordering and strengthening the systems of public health and education
3. Enhancing the competitiveness of the economy
4. Restoring political integrity and combating corruption
5. Fostering cooperation, connection, and reduction of polarization

The party signals zero tolerance toward corruption, digital modernization of the state, investment in strategic infrastructure, emphasis on social stability and demography, and balanced defense and security modernization.

== Leadership ==
President: Vladimir Prebilič
General Secretary: Brane Golubović
Vice President: Klemen Grošelj

== Notable members ==
- Vladimir Prebilič, MEP and party founder and president
- Klemen Grošelj, former MEP and vice-president
- Janez Poklukar, former Minister for Health
- Andrej Bertoncelj, former Minister of Finance
- Mitja Bervar, former president of the National Council
- Jernej Pikalo, former Minister of Education
- Boštjan Koražija, former MP for Levica
- Dušan Vučko, former MP for LDS and former president of DVK

== Election results ==
=== National Assembly ===
Election	Leader	Votes	%	Seats	+/–	Government
2026	Vladimir Prebilič	35,076	3.05 (#8)	0 / 90	New	Extra-parliamentary
