= Dejan Kaloh =

Slovenian politician (born 1975)

President of Sovereign
- Incumbent
- Assumed office 2025

Member of the National Assembly
- In office 2018 – 10 April 2026

Personal details
- Born: February 1, 1975 (age 51) Maribor, SR Slovenia, SFR Yugoslavia
- Party: Sovereign (since 2025); Slovenian Democratic Party (2011–2024); Lipa (2008–2011); Slovenian National Party (until 2008)
- Profession: Lawyer, Politician

Dejan Kaloh (born 1 February 1975) is a Slovenian lawyer, politician, and a member of the National Assembly.

== Early life and education ==
Kaloh was born in Maribor. He graduated in 2007 from the Faculty of Law in Maribor, with a thesis on the Russian electoral system. In 2014, he earned a master's degree from the Graduate School of State and European Studies in Kranj.

== Political career ==
Kaloh began his political career in the Slovenian National Party (SNS) before moving to the party Lipa. He worked in various roles, including as an advisor at the Ministry of the Interior during the second government of Janez Janša. In 2015, he joined the National Assembly as an assistant to the SDS parliamentary group.

In 2018, he was elected to the National Assembly, becoming the first SDS representative from Maribor. He was re-elected in 2022. In 2024, he left SDS after disagreements over internal party loyalty declarations.

== Media and publications ==
In 2017, Kaloh hosted the political show "Eksploziv" on Nova24TV. He is the author of several political books, including:

- Od partije do Patrie
- Milan Kučan: Ko boter spregovori o sebi
- Od Nagodeta do Janše

He also wrote columns for the political magazine Demokracija.

== Personal life ==
Kaloh is married to Natalia, a university professor, and they have a daughter. He enjoys hiking and boxing and once walked across Slovenia in eight days.
