= Pirate Party (Slovenia) =

Pirate Party of Slovenia Piratska stranka Slovenije
- President: Jasmin Feratović
- Registered: 17 October 2012
- Ideology: Pirate politics Freedom of information Open government Network neutrality
- Political position: Syncretic
- International affiliation: Pirate Parties International
- European political alliance: European Pirate Party
- Colours: Black
- National Assembly: 0 / 90
- European Parliament: 0 / 9
- Mayors: 0 / 212
- Municipal council: 6 / 2,750

Website
- piratskastranka.si

Pirate Party of Slovenia (Slovene: Piratska stranka Slovenije) is a political party in Slovenia. The party was officially registered on 17 October 2012 in Ljubljana.

The party was founded on the same common grounds and principles as other Pirate parties throughout the world, most notably the Swedish Pirate Party. It became a member of the Pirate Parties International on 12 March 2011 at the Pirate Parties International conference in Friedrichshafen, Germany.

== Programme ==
The party's programme currently consists of seven topics:

- Respect of human rights.
- Privacy and data protection.
- Free and neutral Internet.
- Government and political transparency.
- Copying monopoly ("copyright") reform.
- Open standards and file formats.
- Free software.

== History ==
The Pirate Party of Slovenia and its original founder Robert Pal first appeared in the Slovenian media in 2009. Until 2012, the party stayed in relative obscurity with only a small circle of active members, mainly discussing current events on the copyright front.

On 12 March 2011, with a unanimous vote, the party entered Pirate Parties International.

In 2012 the Anti-Counterfeiting Trade Agreement (ACTA) controversy and Occupy movement sparked the new wave of activity, the party attracted new members and became more visible.

The party was officially registered on 17 October 2012 in Ljubljana. Rok Deželak has been elected as the president.

The party participated in the 2014 European Parliament elections and received 2.57% of the vote.

The party received 1.34% of the vote in the Slovenian parliamentary election on 13 July 2014, and did not win any seats in parliament.

== Electoral results ==
=== National Assembly ===
| Election | Leader | Votes | % | Seats | +/– | Government |
|---|---|---|---|---|---|---|
| 2014 | Rok Deželak | 11,737 | 1.34 (#11) | 0 / 90 | New | Extra-parliamentary |
| 2018 | Rok Andrée | 19,182 | 2.15 (#11) | 0 / 90 | 0 | Extra-parliamentary |
| 2022 | Boštjan Tavčar | 19,480 | 1.63 (#12) | 0 / 90 | 0 | Extra-parliamentary |
| 2026 | Jasmin Feratović | 27,811 | 2.36 (#9) | 0 / 90 | 0 | Extra-parliamentary |

=== Presidential ===
| Election | Candidate | 1st round | | 2nd round | | Result |
| Election | Candidate | Votes | % | Votes | % | Result |
|---|---|---|---|---|---|---|
| 2022 (Note: In coalition with Youth Party – European Greens) | Nataša Pirc Musar | 234,361 | 26.88 | 483,812 | 53.89 | Won |

== See also ==
- Politics of Slovenia
