= Vesna – Green Party =

Vesna – Green Party VESNA – zelena stranka
- Abbreviation: Vesna
- Leader: Uroš Macerl, Urša Zgojznik
- Founded: 9 February 2022
- Ideology: Green politics Pro-Europeanism
- Political position: Centre-left
- National affiliation: Levica and Vesna (2025-2026)
- European affiliation: European Green Party
- European Parliament group: Greens–European Free Alliance (2024–2025)
- Colours: Green
- National Assembly: 0 / 90
- European Parliament: 0 / 9
- Mayors: 0 / 212
- Municipal council: 2 / 2,750

Website
- vesnazelenastranka.si

Vesna – Green Party (Slovene: VESNA – zelena stranka; Vesna) is a Slovenian green political party, founded on 9 February 2022. At the founding congress, it presented the program and 4 program pillars: environment, democracy, social justice and creativity. The name Vesna derives from the Slavic goddess Vesna, associated with spring.

Since December 2021, the party began to appear in the opinion polling for the 2022 Slovenian parliamentary election. The party became an Associate Member of the European Green Party on 3 June 2023.

== Election results ==
=== National Assembly ===
Election	Leader	Votes	%	Seats	+/–	Government
2022	Uroš Macerl; Urša Zgojznik	16,089	1.35 (#15)	0 / 90	New	Extra-parliamentary
2026 (Note: Run in coalition with The Left, see Levica and Vesna)	Uroš Macerl; Urša Zgojznik	67,183	5.69 (#6)	0 / 90	0	Extra-parliamentary

=== Presidential ===
Election	Candidate	1st round		2nd round		Result
Election	Candidate	Votes	%	Votes	%	Result
2022 (Note: Supported Vladimir Prebilič as independent candidate.)	Vladimir Prebilič	92,456	10.60			Lost

=== European Parliament ===
Election	List leader	Votes	%	Seats	+/–	EP Group
2024	Vladimir Prebilič	70,398	10.54 (#3)	1 / 9	New	Greens/EFA
