= Urša Zgojznik =

Slovene environmental activist and politician

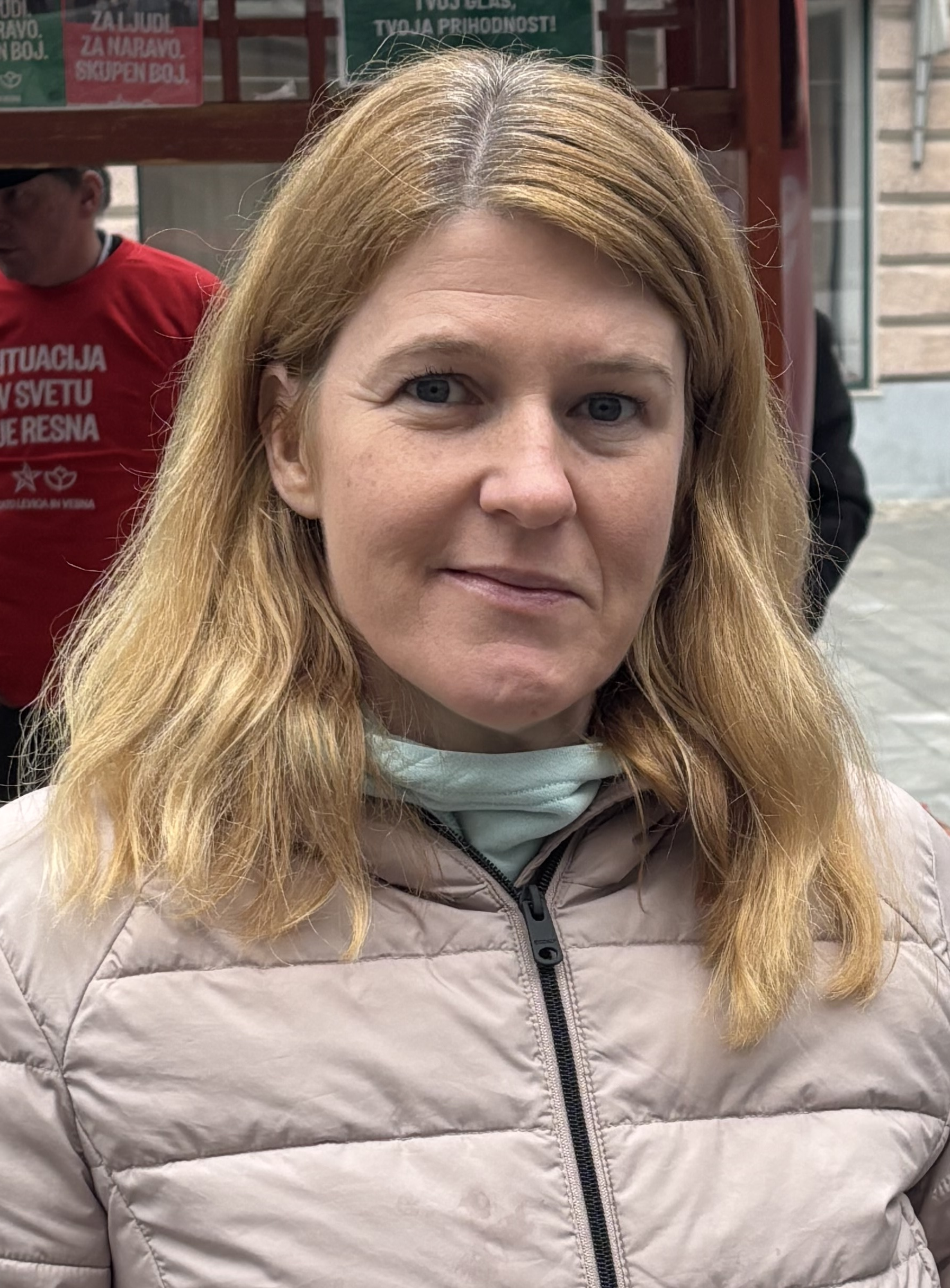

Co-president of Vesna – Green Party
- Incumbent
- Assumed office 9 February 2022
- Preceded by: Position established

Personal details
- Born: 1 August 1980 (age 45) Mozirje, SR Slovenia, Yugoslavia
- Party: Vesna – Green Party (2022–)
- Education: Faculty of Education Maribor

Urša Zgojznik is a Slovenian environmentalist, activist, politician, and lecturer; born 1 August 1980. Since 2022, she is serving as co-president of the Vesna – Green Party.

== Early life ==
She attended primary school in Mozirje (1987–1995), the Secondary School of Economics in Celje (1995–1999), and the Faculty of Education in Maribor, where she studied mathematics and pedagogy (1999–2006), obtaining the title of “professor of mathematics and pedagogy”.

== Environmental years ==
Since 2014, she served as president of the environmental non-governmental organization Ecologists Without Borders (2014–2022), which focuses on connecting and socially activating people, as well as projects in the field of waste prevention, reduction, and reuse. In the first two campaigns Clean Up Slovenia in 2010 and 2012, which mobilized 14% of Slovenia’s population, Zgojznik served as the head of local coordination for 212 municipalities and, in 2012, also as the project leader. She also led the campaign Clean Up Slovenia 2018. She led projects such as Eko-concept, Zero Waste tourism, and “Let’s Not Throw Away Food!”, among others. She is actively engaged in issues related to food waste, sustainable tourism, the implementation of circular economy concepts and Zero Waste, as well as environmental awareness and education.

In 2018, readers of the magazine Jana voted her Slovenian Woman of the Year, and in the same year she was also nominated for Delo Person of the Year.

== Political career ==
In 2019, she ran in the European elections as the lead candidate of the list “Let's Connect”, with the support of the European Green Party. The list brought together several non-parliamentary parties and civil movements to form a broad platform for cooperation.

At the end of 2021, together with a group of like-minded individuals, she announced the Vesna – Green Party, which was founded in 2022 and (alongside Uroš Macerl) became its co-president.
