= Slovenian Red Cross =

- Rdeči križ Slovenije
- Founded: 1944
- Type: Non-profit organisation
- Purpose: Humanitarian Aid
- Location: Slovenia
- Key people: Ana Žerjal (Chair)
- Affiliations: International Committee of the Red Cross; International Federation of Red Cross and Red Crescent Societies

The Slovenian Red Cross (Slovene: Rdeči križ Slovenije) is a non-government and non-profit humanitarian organisation, part of the International Red Cross and Red Crescent Movement. It was established in Gradac in June 1944, at first as part of the Yugoslav Red Cross. It became an independent entity after the Slovenian proclamation of independence in 1991. It has its headquarters in Ljubljana, Slovenia.
