= Suvereni =

- President: Dejan Kaloh
- Vice Presidents: Sebastijan Holcman; Roman Križnjak; Drago Lešnik; Peter Ostrež; Roman Križnjak
- Party Council President: Nino Kac
- Founded: 20 June 2025
- Split from: Slovenian Democratic Party
- Headquarters: Cafova ulica 5, Maribor
- Ideology: Nationalism; Conservatism; Euroscepticism
- Political position: Right-wing
- Colours: Dark green; Light blue; Dark blue
- National Assembly: 1 / 90
- European Parliament: 0 / 9
- Mayors: 0 / 212
- Municipal Councillors: 1 / 2,750

Website
- suvereni.si

Suvereni (lit. 'The Sovereign Ones') is a right-wing political party in Slovenia founded by former SDS MP and lawyer Dejan Kaloh along with his associates. The founding congress was held on June 20, 2025, in Maribor, where Kaloh was elected president of the party.

== History ==
=== Background ===
Party founder Dejan Kaloh was, in February 2024, one of three members of the Slovenian Democratic Party parliamentary group who did not sign a pledge to remain a member and MP of the party until the end of the term. He explained his decision by saying that he "represents the interests of voters" and "thinks with his own head", while party president Janša responded that "apparently a new independent parliamentary group is forming from MPs who no longer follow the will of the voters who elected them".

In October 2024, Anže Logar and Eva Irgl left SDS and announced the formation of a new party. Speculation arose that Kaloh would follow and thereby enable the formation of a parliamentary group of the new party, which requires at least three MPs. On October 19, he did so and announced he would join the new party, Democrats. Just before the founding congress in November 2024, a sharp personal dispute arose between Logar and Kaloh, and Kaloh did not attend the congress. A few days after the formation of Demokrati, he accused Logar in an open letter of being an "exploitative antidemocrat and a premeditated fraud on voters." Logar, on the other hand, accused Kaloh of conditioning his membership on a vice-presidency, which Kaloh denied, stating that "it would be dishonorable to join such a false political story."

On January 29, 2025, Dejan Kaloh announced the formation of a new party, Suvereni, which aims to become the voice of conscious Slovenes and the sovereignty of the nation. The party took six months to form; its program was co-written by linguist Marko Jesenek and economist Jože P. Damijan. The founding congress took place partially in person and partially online on Friday, June 20, 2025.

== Leadership ==
- Party President: Dejan Kaloh
- Vice Presidents: Ksenija Vaš, Roman Križnjak, Sebastijan Holcman, Peter Ostrež, Drago Lešnik
- President of the Council: Nino Kac
- Secretary-General: TBA
- Executive Committee: TBA
- Party Council: TBA
