= Litijska Affair =

The Litijska Affair (also known as The Affair over the Purchase of the Court Building on Litijska Street 51) is a Slovenian political scandal concerning the allegedly controversial purchase of a new judicial building in Ljubljana, intended to address the judiciary’s spatial shortages. The affair raised questions about the transparency of the procedure, the appropriateness of the purchase price, and possible conflicts of interest between decision-makers and the property’s sellers.

The affair was first exposed by the media, particularly the investigative team of the television program Tarča on TV Slovenija, hosted by Erika Žnidaršič.

== Development of events ==
The first internal discussions about the possible purchase took place on 5 December 2023, when Saša Jazbec, State Secretary at the Ministry of Finance, reportedly mentioned the possibility of completing the deal before the end of that year. On 18 December, the then State Secretary at the Ministry of Justice, Uroš Gojkovič, who was advocating for a rapid purchase, presented the project to Finance Minister Klemen Boštjančič, who allegedly rejected it outright.

On 22 December, a meeting between the Minister of Justice and the Minister of Finance led to a consensus, and the project was given the green light. On 27 December, the government of Prime Minister Robert Golob officially approved the purchase of the office building at Litijska Street 51 in Ljubljana. The Ministry of Justice was to use the premises for the Administrative Court, the Labour and Social Court, and the Higher Labour and Social Court.

The purchase contract was signed on 28 December between the Minister and the seller, Sebastjan Vežnaver. The contract consisted of only four pages and contained no protective clauses for the buyer, including a “sold as seen” provision. On the next day, 29 December, the Ministry transferred the payment of €7,690,350 to the seller — even though the building had not yet been taken over.

The first media reports about the deal appeared on 5 January 2024, claiming that the state had overpaid for the building and revealing that the property had suffered a fire in 2017.

On 11 January, the program Tarča aired its first episode on the topic. The investigative team presented evidence showing that the Ministry of Justice, with the approval of the government and Finance Minister Boštjančič, had paid Vežnaver €7.7 million for a deteriorating building that he had bought at auction in 2019 for just €1.7 million. The program also revealed inconsistencies between two property valuations — one of which was allegedly falsified. The then Minister of Justice, Dominika Švarc Pipan, heard about these allegations for the first time during the broadcast, which cast serious doubt on the credibility of the valuations.

That same day, the National Bureau of Investigation (NPU) launched an inquiry into the purchase.

By mid-January, discussions were already underway about the possibility of annulling the purchase, but legal experts concluded that this was impossible under the signed contract.

A second Tarča episode, broadcast on 18 January, gained attention because it was filmed directly on-site at the Litijska building. Minister Švarc Pipan saw the building for the first time during the broadcast. Also present was Nina Zidar Klemenčič, the seller’s lawyer, who was rumored (though never confirmed) to have earned a million-euro commission from the deal. The broadcast showed the building’s dilapidated condition and raised further concerns about the rationale behind the purchase — particularly given that the large atrium in the middle of the structure was unsuitable for court use.

On 19 January, the government dismissed State Secretary Uroš Gojkovič. A few days later, on 23 January, the Commission for the Prevention of Corruption received a formal complaint regarding the deal.

The third Tarča episode aired on 25 January, amid reports that members of the Social Democrats (SD), the Minister’s own party, had withdrawn their support for her. It was estimated that renovations of the building could cost between €7.5 and €10 million. The Minister did not appear in the broadcast, reportedly due to the recent death of her father. Out of respect, the SDS temporarily withdrew a planned interpellation motion against her.

After several days of political tension, the SD leadership met on 29 January and unanimously called on Švarc Pipan to resign. She refused, saying that doing so would mean “sweeping the affair under the rug.”

On 31 January, the Minister publicly accused several of her colleagues from the Ministry — all members of SD — of organized criminal activity. She also accused the party’s general secretary, Klemen Žibert, of attempting to influence the choice of notaries and the purchase process itself.

In early February 2024, a fourth Tarča episode revealed that four key figures in the affair — including Igor Šoltes, Uroš Gojkovič, and Simon Starček — had replaced their mobile phones within 12 hours of the first broadcast. This fueled speculation that the SD party itself, rather than the Minister alone, was deeply entangled in the scandal.

On 5 February, Minister Švarc Pipan offered her resignation to Prime Minister Robert Golob, who accepted it the next day. The formal resignation was submitted to the National Assembly on 15 February, and MPs acknowledged it in an extraordinary session the following day.

Finally, on 12 February, Švarc Pipan officially left the Social Democrats.

== Aftermath ==
For the maintenance of the purchased building — including the installation of fencing, security systems, cleaning, and urgent repairs — the state spent nearly €70,000 in the first year after the purchase, until January 2025.
