= Tina Bregant =

Slovene politician

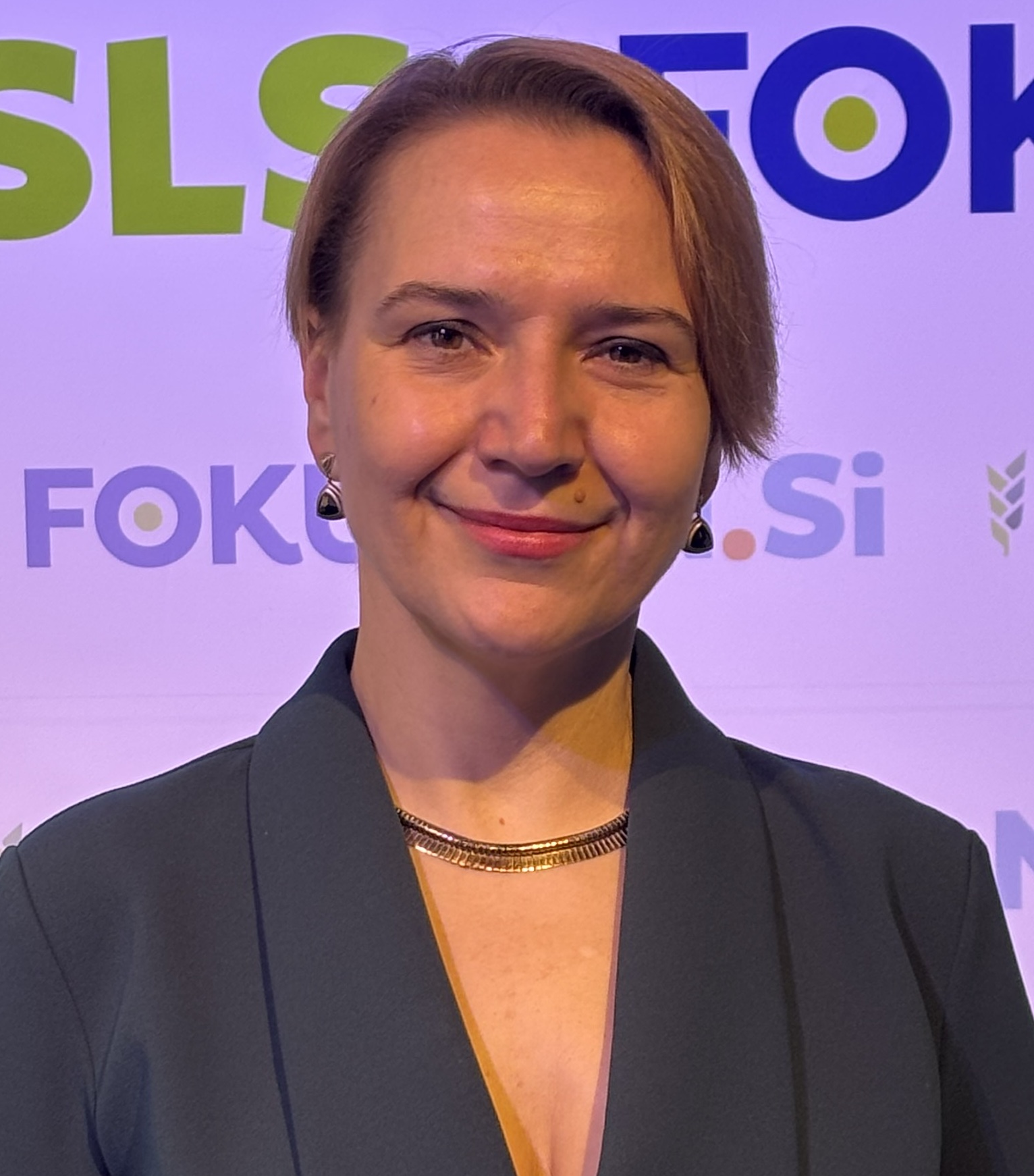
- Bregant in 2026
- Born: Tina Marolt; November 16, 1975 (age 50); Ljubljana, Slovenia
- Occupations: Pediatrician, Physiatrist, Politician, University Lecturer
- Known for: Secretary of State (Ministry of Health, 2020), City Councillor in Ljubljana
- Children: 3
- Parent: Janez Marolt

Tina Bregant (née Marolt; born 16 November 1975) is a Slovenian doctor, politician, and university lecturer.

She currently serves as a city councillor in the City Municipality of Ljubljana, within the group of independent councillors. In the 2022 Slovenian local elections, she ran for mayor of Ljubljana as a joint candidate of the Slovenian People's Party (SLS) and Our Country, receiving 5,033 out of 89,405 votes.

In 2020, during the government of Janez Janša, she served briefly as Secretary of State at the Ministry of Health, and later headed the ministerial cabinet.

Bregant is a specialist in Pediatrics and Physical and Rehabilitation Medicine. In 2013, she earned a PhD with a dissertation titled "The impact of hypoxic-ischemic encephalopathy on quality of life in adolescence". She works as a pediatrician and physiatrist at the medical unit of CIRIUS Kamnik.

She authored the book Exciting Journey Through the Developing Brain, a combination of a neuroscience monograph and a practical parenting guide. It provides a holistic view of child and brain development from conception to puberty.
