= Uroš Macerl =

Slovenian environmental activist

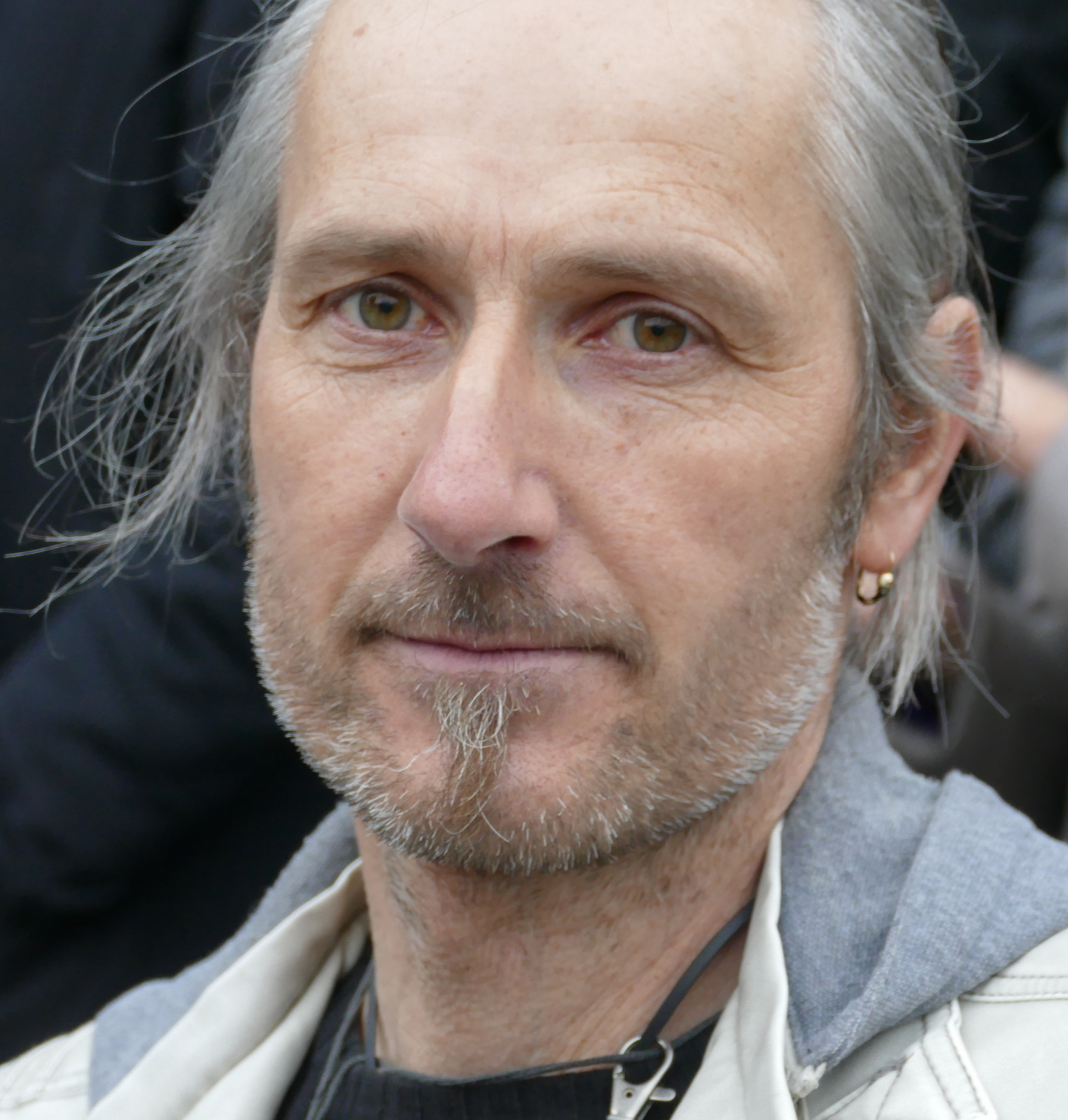

Uroš Macerl (born 4 July 1968) (Note: A description of Macerl in 2017 stated that he was 48 years old.) is an organic farmer and environmental activist from Slovenia. He won the Goldman Environmental Prize in 2017 after leading a successful legal challenge against the company operating a cement kiln that was incinerating hazardous waste near his farm.

== Biography ==
A farm belonging to Macerl's family stands on a hill near the town of Trbovlje. Air pollution from nearby factories has affected people and wildlife in the region for a long time. Macerl grew up on the farm, which belonged to his grandfather at the time; he has said that he remembers the effects of coal dust pollution on the farm that he witnessed as a child. Macerl, who began running the farm when he was 23, switched to raising sheep on his property after rising air pollution prevented him from raising crops any longer. The region Macerl lived in in central Slovenia had a history with air pollution from emissions from industrial towns. The area had above average rates of cancer, and of respiratory illnesses among children. The European Union introduced incentives in recent years for companies willing to incinerate energy sources such as "medical waste, old tires, and other industrial residue", in place of coal. As a result of this policy, companies such as Lafarge Cement began refurbishing old industrial plants to use the new fuel. Lafarge started burning petcoke, a byproduct of oil refining, in a 130-year old cement plant. Both cement production and petcoke burning are known to be highly polluting processes.

Macerl's family farm stood near the plant reopened by Lafarge. Macerl, the president of a local environmental group called Eko Krog ("Eco Circle"), organized local residents to collect data on air pollution; though they presented this to the media, it had little impact. In 2009 Lafarge applied for a permit to burn hazardous waste at the plant; Macerl's property fell within the zone that the company said would be affected, allowing him to challenge the permit in court. Macerl was the only person legally permitted to make this challenge before the European Commission, where the legal battle went from the local authorities. The Commission ruled in favor of the residents of the town in 2015, and Lafarge was forced to stop cement production at the plant. In 2017 Macerl was awarded the Goldman Environmental Prize, described in the Slovenian media as being a Nobel Prize for environmental activism. Macerl's legal battle led to him separating from his spouse. He has said that his effort had taught his three children "that the struggle was worth it".
