= Vladimir Prebilič =

Slovenian politician

Vladimir Prebilič MEP
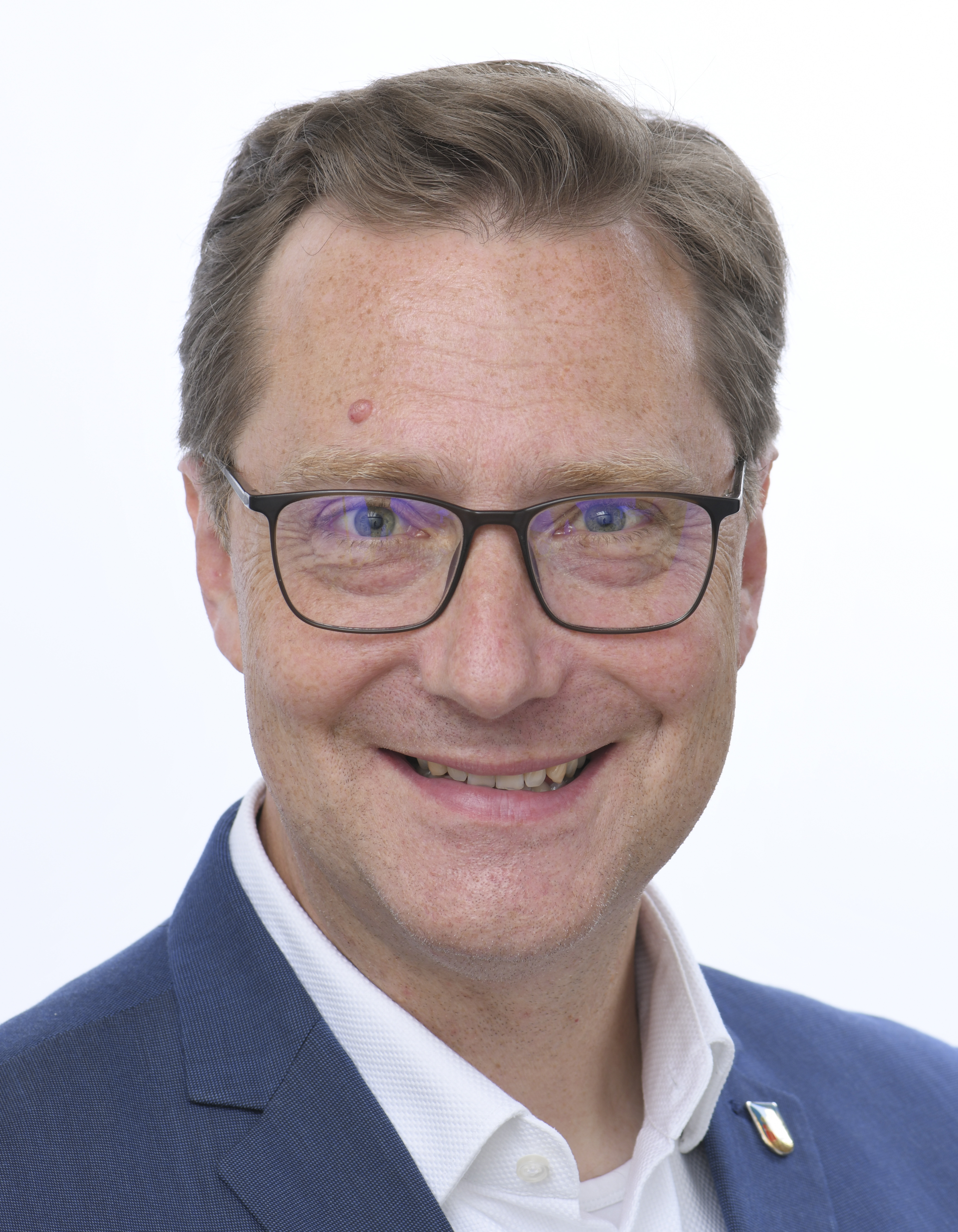
- Official portrait, 2024

Member of the European Parliament for Slovenia
- Incumbent
- Assumed office 16 July 2024

Mayor of the Municipality of Kočevje
- In office 2010 – 15 July 2024

Personal details
- Born: 13 July 1974 (age 51) Ljubljana, Slovenia
- Party: Prerod (since 2025)
- Other political affiliations: Vesna (2024–2025)

Vladimir Prebilič (born 21 May 1974) is a Slovenian politician for the Prerod party, which he founded and currently chairs. He was elected member of the European Parliament during the 2024 European Parliament election in Slovenia.

He sits in the Greens–European Free Alliance Group in the European Parliament.
