= Opinion polling for the 2026 Slovenian parliamentary election =

In the run-up to the 2026 Slovenian parliamentary election, various organisations carry out opinion polling to gauge voting intention in Slovenia. Results of such polls are displayed in this article.

The date range for these opinion polls are from the previous parliamentary election, held on 24 April 2022, to the present day. The next parliamentary election is scheduled to be held no later than four years since the previous one.

== Pollsters ==
Public opinion polls on voting intention in Slovenia are mainly conducted regularly by five agencies:

- Mediana, which conducts separate public opinion polls for the newspaper Delo, RTV Slovenia and for the television channel POP TV and its respective multimedia web portal 24ur.com;
- Ninamedia, which conducts the Vox Populi public opinion polls for the newspaper Dnevnik and;
- Parsifal SC, which conducts public opinion polls for the conservative news media enterprise Nova24TV;
- Research Center IJEK, which conducts the Pulse of Society public opinion polls, which has ties to centre-right NSi;
- Valicon, which conducts polls for Siol.net.

== Graphical summary ==
The following graph depicts the evolution of standings of the main political parties in the polling average since last parliamentary election. The graph shows the average vote share of each party, excluding undecided voters.

== Poll results ==
Poll results are listed in the table in reverse chronological order, showing the most recent first. The highest figure in each survey is displayed in bold, and the background shaded in the leading party's colour. In the case of a tie, no figure is shaded. When available, seat projections for 88 out of 90 seats (without seats reserved for minorities) are displayed below the percentages in a smaller font. 46 seats are required for an absolute majority in the National Assembly. The dates of when the poll was conducted are given when available, otherwise, the date of publication is listed.

=== 2026 ===
Exit poll

Date(s) conducted	Pollster	Client	Sample size	GS	SDS	NSi	SLS	FOKUS	SD	Levica	Vesna	ZS	SG	RES	PIR	SNS	DEM	PVP	MI!	GU	ZAU	AZAS	Others	Und.	Lead
22 Mar	Election results		1,179,769	28.7	27.9	9.3			6.7	5.7		0.5		5.5	2.4	2.2	6.7	3.1	0.5	0.4	0.3	0.4	0.0 (Note: 0.1 - Spoiled ballots 0.0 - Unity 0.0 - Solution - Party of Pensioners Velenje, Slovenia)	–	0.8
22 Mar	Mediana	RTV & POP	14,244	**29.9**	27.5	9.4			6.7	6.3		0.4		5.2	2.1	2.2	5.9	2.9	0.6	0.3	0.2	0.3	0.1	–	2.4
18–20 Mar	Valicon	Siol	1,034	**28.7**	25.2	7.8			9.0	8.4		–		4.0	2.2	2.5	7.0	3.0	0.7	–	–	–	1.4	–	3.5
18–20 Mar	Ninamedia	Dnevnik	860	**30.2**	26.2	7.7			7.7	8.2		0.6		3.6	2.1	2.2	5.6	3.0	1.0	0.7	0.5	0.4	0.4 (Note: 0.2 - Unity 0.2 - Solution - Party of Pensioners Velenje, Slovenia)	–	4.0
16–18 Mar	IJEK	N/A	678	22.8	**26.3**	10.4			8.1	8.6		0.5		3.8	2.5	2.1	6.7	2.3	0.8	0.2	0.8	0.5	–	–	3.5
16–18 Mar	Ninamedia	Dnevnik	858	**29.4**	25.7	8.0			8.2	8.1		0.5		3.8	2.5	2.1	6.1	3.1	1.0	0.4	0.5	0.5	0.2 (Note: 0.1 - Unity 0.1 - Solution - Party of Pensioners Velenje, Slovenia)	–	3.7
16–18 Mar	Mediana	RTV & POP	1,598	**27.8**	27.7	8.8			5.5	7.6		0.6		5.1	2.8	2.0	7.3	3.4	0.8	0.6	0.0	0.1	–	–	0.4
14–17 Mar	Ninamedia	Dnevnik	858	**30.7**	26.0	8.2			7.7	8.4		0.3		3.2	2.1	1.9	6.7	3.1	0.9	0.3	0.4	0.5	0.2 (Note: 0.1 - Unity 0.1 - Solution - Party of Pensioners Velenje, Slovenia)	–	4.7
13–16 Mar	Ninamedia	Dnevnik	852	**30.4**	26.1	8.0			8.0	8.8		0.3		3.2	1.7	1.8	6.7	2.4	0.7	0.4	0.5	0.7	0.2 (Note: 0.1 - Unity 0.1 - Solution - Party of Pensioners Velenje, Slovenia)	–	4.3
13–16 Mar	Valicon	Siol	900	**25.6**	23.1	7.5			7.1	8.0		1.6		4.0	4.3	3.2	9.0	3.2	1.3	–	–	1.1	1.0	–	2.5
10–16 Mar	IJEK	N/A	719	19.8	**27.6**	10.1			11.8	7.0		0.8		5.5	2.8	3.0	7.8	2.6	0.6	0.2	0.4	0.0	–	–	7.8
12–14 Mar	Ninamedia	Dnevnik	855	**29.7**	26.4	7.9			8.3	8.4		0.5		3.6	1.4	2.0	6.7	2.4	0.7	0.4	0.8	0.3	0.6 (Note: 0.3 - Unity 0.3 - Solution - Party of Pensioners Velenje, Slovenia)	–	3.3
11–13 Mar	Ninamedia	Dnevnik	752	**28.3**	26.0	8.1			7.8	8.8		0.5		3.5	1.7	2.1	7.2	2.6	0.8	0.8	0.8	0.4	0.6 (Note: 0.3 - Unity 0.3 - Solution - Party of Pensioners Velenje, Slovenia)	–	2.3
9–12 Mar	Mediana	RTV	716	25.1	**31.2**	7.0			6.5	8.4		0.5		4.7	2.2	2.2	7.5	1.8	1.5	–	–	0.9	0.5	–	6.1
7–10 Mar	Ninamedia	Dnevnik	935	**24.1**	23.3	7.1			7.2	7.2		0.7		3.2	1.1	1.9	6.1	2.6	1.1	0.9	0.9	0.1	0.2 (Note: 0.1 - Unity 0.1 - Solution - Party of Pensioners Velenje, Slovenia)	12.3	0.8
6–10 Mar	Parsifal	Nova24	681	23.1	**30.0**	7.5			7.6	7.9		0.6		4.6	2.5	2.8	9.2	2.2	0.6	1.3	–	–	–	–	6.9
1–10 Mar	IJEK	N/A	723	20.3	**29.8**	9.0			11.4	5.9		1.0		4.0	2.9	2.8	8.9	2.9	0.5	0.2	0.4	0.0	–	–	9.5
6–9 Mar	Valicon	Siol	1.525	19.5	**22.9**	5.5			7.8	6.3		1.1		4.9	3.9	2.5	9.6	2.7	1.5	0.8	–	1.2	1.1	8.9	3.4
2–5 Mar	Mediana	Delo	731	25.1	**27.7**	8.0			6.9	9.7		0.3		3.8	3.6	2.3	6.7	1.9	1.3	1.6	0.5	0.4	0.0	–	2.6
26 Feb - 2 Mar	Parsifal	Nova24	521	22.1	**31.8**	8.7			8.6	5.6		0.8		3.2	2.5	2.1	8.0	3.8	1.2	0.8	–	0.9 (Note: 0.9 - None of This)	–	–	9.7
24–26 Feb	Parsifal	Nova24	562	23.0	**30.9**	7.1			10.5	5.7		0.7		3.4	2.5	2.3	9.1	3.6	0.7	–	–	0.6 (Note: 0.6 - None of This)	–	–	7.9
23–26 Feb	Mediana	POP	719	17.8	**24.5**	4.7			5.1	7.2		1.1		3.9	2.7	2.1	5.4	2.1	1.7	0.1	0.7	0.0	0.2	20.7	6.7
23–25 Feb	Ninamedia	Dnevnik	700	27.0	**28.0**	9.1			8.2	7.8		0.6		2.6	1.6	1.2	7.8	2.9	1.7	0.5	0.8 (Note: 0.7 - Karl Erjavec - Trust Party 0.1 - Suvereni)	0.1 (Note: 0.1 - None of This)	–	–	1.0
20–24 Feb	Parsifal	Nova24	581	23.8	**31.9**	8.2			7.4	6.6		0.7		2.5	3.2	1.8	8.4	4.1	–	1.1	–	–	–	–	8.1
20–23 Feb	Valicon	Siol	1.539	20.6	**23.8**	5.2			7.6	5.9		1.4		3.9	2.4	3.5	6.8	4.0	1.9	1.4	–	–	1.3	10.3	3.2
19 Feb	The official campaign period begins.																								
18 Feb	Suvereni announce they will participate on the Karl Erjavec - Trust Party list at the next election																								
1–14 Feb	IJEK	N/A	572	17.4	**23.0**	6.2			6.2	7.8		1.6		3.6	2.3	1.9	6.0	1.6	1.1	2.2	0.1	–	0.3	18.6	5.6
9–13 Feb	Parsifal	Nova24	777	20.3	**29.0**	9.8			8.2	6.1		1.6		3.4	4.8	1.5	7.5	4.2	1.3	1.1	–	1.1 (Note: 1.1 - None of This)	–	29.6	6.1
9–12 Feb	Mediana	RTV	755	16.2	**21.6**	7.8			7.1	5.4		1.4		4.0	4.0	2.4	5.7	2.6	1.2	1.2	0.3	0.0	0.9	23.9	5.4
9–11 Feb	Ninamedia	Dnevnik	700	21.3	**24.3**	6.5			6.1	7.0		0.8		3.1	1.4	1.3	6.5	2.5	1.6	0.8	1.1	0.1 (Note: 0.1 - None of This)	0.6 (Note: 0.6 - Suvereni)	15.0	3.0
6–8 Feb	Valicon	Siol	1.526	19.1	**22.2**	6.3			9.1	6.6		–	–	4.4	2.8	3.3	6.6	3.8	2.0	1.2	–	–	1.2	11.5	3.1
2–5 Feb	Mediana	Delo	720	16.2	**21.2**	6.6			7.1	5.6		0.8	0.9	2.5	3.0	2.6	8.5	2.6	1.2	0.3	0.8	0.4	0.5	19.2	5.0
2 Feb	Greens of Slovenia and Party of Generations announce they will participate together at the next election																								
26–29 Jan	Mediana	POP	725	14.9	**21.7**	5.4			6.3	5.9		1.0	0.3	3.0	3.9	2.0	5.9	2.8	0.9	1.0	0.2	–	0.9 (Note: 0.0 - Suvereni)	23.9	6.8
26–27 Jan	Ninamedia	Mladina	1,537	19.1	**22.6**	6.5			6.4	6.1		–	–	3.5	1.1	1.2	6.1	2.7	1.1	–	–	–	–	19.7	3.5
1–25 Jan	IJEK	N/A	489	14.5	**20.8**	7.0			6.6	7.2		0.3	1.1	3.6	1.2	2.5	6.0	1.7	0.7	0.6	0.1	–	–	25.8	6.0
23–25 Jan	Valicon	Siol	1,537	18.3	**22.5**	6.0			8.7	6.4		2.0	–	5.3	2.6	2.7	7.3	3.1	2.2	–	–	–	1.1	10.4	4.2
21 Jan	New Slovenia, Slovenian People's Party and Focus of Marko Lotrič announce that they will participate together at the next election																								
19 Jan	None of This and For a Healthy Society announce that they will participate together at the next election, as Alternative for Slovenia																								
12–15 Jan	Mediana	RTV	712	16.9	**20.6**	4.6	0.6	0.9	6.4	5.2		1.0	0.3	4.5	2.8	1.0	5.2	2.4	1.4	1.1	0.3	0.3 (Note: 0.3 - None of This)	0.3 (Note: 0.0 - Suvereni)	23.9	3.7
12–14 Jan	Parsifal	Nova24	711	20.2	**25.6**	4.0	0.7	0.4	4.8	4.5		–	–	2.7	1.4	–	5.4	2.7	1.1	0.8	0.2	–	0.9	24.6	5.4
12–14 Jan	Ninamedia	Dnevnik	700	17.9	**23.9**	5.3	1.1	0.9	6.7	5.3		0.5	0.5	3.4	1.7	1.9	7.6	2.8	1.4	1.1	0.2	0.2 (Note: 0.2 - None of This)	0.6 (Note: 0.6 - Suvereni)	15.8	6.0
6–8 Jan	Mediana	Delo	729	18.3	**21.3**	3.9	2.0	0.2	6.0	2.1	1.2	0.1	0.1	4.2	3.7	3.3	3.8	1.5	1.8	0.2	0.2	–	0.9	24.6	3.0
24 Apr 2022	Election results		1,168,542	34.5	23.5	6.9	3.4 (Note: part of Let's Connect Slovenia)	–	6.7	4.4	1.5	3.4 (Note: part of Let's Connect Slovenia)	–	2.9	1.7	1.6	–	–	–	–	–	–	13.2	–	11.0

=== 2025 ===
Date(s) conducted	Pollster	Client	Sample size	GS	SDS	NSi	SLS	FOKUS	SD	Levica	Vesna	ZS	RES	SG	PIR	SNS	DEM	PVP	GU	MI!	Others	Und.	Lead
26–28 Dec	Valicon	Siol	1,525	19.0	**23.9**	5.2	1.3	0.7	7.4	4.5		1.4	4.9	–	2.5	4.4	7.1	2.6	–	2.1	2.2	10.6	4.9
1–18 Dec	IJEK	N/A	720	15.0	**19.1**	7.2			8.4	5.7		1.7	2.6	0.4	3.0	3.9	5.1	1.2	1.3	0.4	0.8 (Note: 0.6 - Karl Erjavec - Trust Party)	24.0	4.1
15–17 Dec	Ninamedia	Dnevnik	700	17.1	**22.1**	5.3	–	–	7.1	4.4	–	–	–	–	–	–	5.6	–	–	–	4.7	34.3	5.0
15–18 Dec	Mediana	RTV	720	17.5	**21.1**	4.4	1.2	0.8	5.7	3.7		0.4	4.2	0.8	2.5	1.9	3.5	2.4	0.3	3.0	0.9 (Note: 0.3 - Suvereni 0.2 - Karl Erjavec - Trust Party 0.0 - None of the above)	25.5	3.6
8–11 Dec	Mediana	POP	715	16.1	**19.5**	4.8	1.9	0.8	6.1	2.2		1.1	3.3	0.5	2.7	1.9	5.0	2.8	0.7	1.5	0.9 (Note: 0.0 - Karl Erjavec - Trust Party)	27.8	3.4
1–4 Dec	Mediana	Delo	710	17.1	**21.0**	3.5	0.8	0.7	6.0	3.6	1.6	1.1	4.4	0.5	1.8	3.2	3.5	2.2	1.2	1.5	1.0	25.3	4.1
24–27 Nov	Mediana	POP	710	14.9	**20.5**	4.5	2.5	1.0	5.2	3.6		1.2	2.6	0.7	1.4	2.0	3.9	4.5	0.7	1.6	1.3	27.8	5.6
21–24 Nov	Valicon	Siol	1,535	19.1	**22.6**	5.0	1.8	–	6.2	5.1		1.7	5.1	–	2.3	3.3	6.7	3.6	1.1	2.0	1.7	12.9	3.5
1–20 Nov	IJEK	N/A	400	15.6	**21.1**	5.8	1.8	0.0	7.3	5.9		1.2	2.7	1.1	2.9	2.9	5.3	4.2	0.0	0.1	0.0 (Note: 0.0 - Karl Erjavec - Trust Party)	22.8	5.5
16 Nov	Miha Kordiš founds We, Socialists!																						
13 Nov	Asta Vrečko and Luka Mesec are elected as co-leaders of The Left																						
10–13 Nov	Mediana	RTV	711	16.7	**21.4**	4.9	1.4	–	6.1	3.8	1.1	0.6	4.1	–	2.0	2.4	3.2	2.9	–	–	1.1	28.2	4.7
10–12 Nov	Ninamedia	Dnevnik	700	16.1	**21.4**	5.3	–	–	6.9	6.6	–	–	–	–	–	–	6.9	–	–	–	8.9	27.5	5.3
3–6 Nov	Mediana	Delo	718	16.4	**20.4**	5.4	2.0	–	4.7	3.6	3.3	–	3.6	–	3.5	2.7	3.5	3.9	–	–	2.5	24.4	4.0
24–26 Oct	Valicon	Siol	1,539	17.3	**23.3**	5.4	1.4	–	7.7	4.9		1.7	4.6	–	2.7	4.8	6.5	4.4	–	–	2.9	12.4	6.0
20–23 Oct	Mediana	POP	709	16.6	**20.6**	3.9	1.4	–	6.1	3.7	1.5	0.1	3.6	–	1.7	2.4	4.1	3.8	–	–	1.3	29.2	4.0
20–22 Oct	Parsifal	Nova24	791	12.1	**22.4**	3.6	0.9	0.7	6.5	5.1		–	2.6	0.4	2.0	–	5.7	5.2	2.8	–	1.8 (Note: 0.4 - Karl Erjavec - Trust Party)	28.1	10.0
17–20 Oct	Valicon	Politikon	1,113	18.6	**21.1**	3.0	1.8	0.8	7.4	4.5	1.9	1.0	4.2	–	2.5	2.7	5.1	4.4	1.8	–	2.7	16.5	2.5
1–20 Oct	IJEK	N/A	304	18.4	**23.3**	4.9	0.9	0.0	4.9	5.8		0.5	3.5	0.0	1.9	2.1	4.9	4.3	1.3	0.2	0.1 (Note: 0.1 - Karl Erjavec - Trust Party)	22.8	4.9
15 Oct	Vladimir Prebilič founds Prerod - Party of Vladimir Prebilič																						
13–15 Oct	Ninamedia	Dnevnik	700	15.4	**23.1**	5.3	0.9	–	6.6	4.9	1.1	–	–	–	–	–	5.6	–	–	–	1.9	30.7	7.7
14 Oct	The Left and Vesna sign an electoral alliance ahead of the next election																						
6–9 Oct	Mediana	Delo	706	14.0	**19.8**	5.3	0.6	–	7.1	4.5	3.0	–	5.0	–	2.0	2.2	4.2	–	–	–	2.0	30.4	5.8
26–29 Sep	Valicon	Siol	1,528	18.2	**21.8**	4.0	2.5	–	8.7	3.9	4.5	1.8	5.3	–	2.9	3.4	6.3	–	1.3	–	3.3	12.1	3.6
22–25 Sep	Mediana	POP	705	17.1	**21.7**	5.3	1.1	–	7.1	4.4	1.2	0.9	3.6	–	1.9	1.6	3.1	–	–	–	1.9	29.2	4.6
13 Sep	Jernej Vrtovec is elected as leader of the New Slovenia																						
1–12 Sep	IJEK	N/A	582	18.4	**22.4**	4.4	0.7	0.6	4.9	5.7	1.2	1.3	4.3	1.1	2.2	3.0	6.2	4.4	2.0	1.4	0.7 (Note: 0.6 - Karl Erjavec - Trust Party)	15.0	4.0
8–10 Sep	Ninamedia	Dnevnik	700	17.1	**22.6**	4.9	0.7	–	6.3	5.0	1.0	–	–	–	–	–	5.4	–	–	–	6.3	30.7	5.5
1–4 Sep	Mediana	Delo	706	14.6	**21.4**	4.5	0.9	–	5.5	3.6	2.6	–	3.2	–	3.5	2.5	4.0	–	–	–	4.3	26.4	6.8
22–25 Aug	Valicon	Siol	1,524	18.4	**21.9**	4.3	1.9	–	7.8	4.7	3.6	2.3	5.1	–	3.3	3.1	6.8	–	1.6	–	3.2	11.9	3.5
18–21 Aug	Mediana	POP	706	15.1	**21.5**	4.4	1.4	–	6.8	4.1	2.6	0.2	2.5	–	1.4	2.3	3.7	–	–	–	2.4	30.0	6.4
11–13 Aug	Ninamedia	Dnevnik	700	15.7	**22.1**	5.3	0.3	–	6.9	4.7	0.3	–	–	–	–	–	3.9	–	–	–	2.9	38.0	6.4
4–7 Aug	Mediana	Delo	712	18.0	**21.8**	3.8	1.4	–	6.3	3.6	2.4	–	4.2	–	3.5	2.3	3.9	–	–	–	2.5	26.3	3.8
1–7 Aug	IJEK	N/A	582	16.2	**21.5**	6.6	1.1	0.5	9.2	5.4	1.8	2.3	4.6	0.3	1.3	2.3	5.7	2.6	1.1	1.4	1.7 (Note: 1.0 - Karl Erjavec - Trust Party)	14.2	5.3
25–28 Jul	Valicon	Siol	1,521	19.0	**21.3**	4.8	1.5	–	8.6	3.5	3.1	1.8	7.6	–	3.8	2.5	6.1	–	1.4	–	3.0	11.9	2.3
21–24 Jul	Mediana	POP	728	17.0	**23.1**	2.9	2.8	–	5.1	3.4	1.2	0.2	4.1	–	1.7	2.1	4.6	–	–	–	1.5	29.2	5.1
7–9 Jul	Ninamedia	Dnevnik	700	15.9	**23.4**	4.9	0.3	–	7.1	4.9	0.3	–	–	–	–	–	3.4	–	–	–	4.0	35.8	7.5
3–9 Jul	IJEK	N/A	607	19.0	**22.5**	6.0	0.8	0.0	8.1	4.1	2.0	2.3	6.0	0.2	1.6	2.0	4.1	2.7	1.0	1.9	1.0 (Note: 0.6 - Karl Erjavec - Trust Party)	18.0	3.5
3 Jul	Concretely merges into Democrats																						
30 Jun–3 Jul	Mediana	Delo	724	14.2	**22.3**	3.9	1.4	–	7.8	3.8	1.4	–	5.1	–	2.0	1.5	4.9	–	–	–	1.1	30.3	8.1
27–30 Jun	Valicon	Siol	1,528	16.4	**23.8**	4.0	1.7	–	9.0	4.6	4.0	1.5	7.2	–	3.7	3.0	5.3	–	1.5	–	3.0	11.3	7.4
20 Jun	Dejan Kaloh founds Suvereni																						
16–19 Jun	Mediana	POP	712	15.2	**23.6**	3.6	2.3	–	4.5	1.7	2.4	0.4	3.8	–	2.2	2.0	4.4	–	–	–	2.0	31.9	8.4
10–12 Jun	Parsifal	Nova24	732	14.2	**23.0**	5.3	1.3	1.2	5.3	5.3	2.5	–	2.8	0.8	2.3	–	4.5	–	1.4	–	2.8 (Note: 0.4 - Karl Erjavec - Trust Party)	27.2	8.8
1–12 Jun	IJEK	N/A	548	19.7	**21.1**	4.8	1.0	0.3	6.9	5.5	1.7	1.4	6.8	0.4	1.6	3.2	4.6	–	2.1	–	0.9 (Note: 0.5 - Karl Erjavec - Trust Party)	18.0	1.4
9–11 Jun	Ninamedia	Dnevnik	700	18.1	**25.3**	5.1	1.0	–	7.0	5.3	2.4	–	–	–	–	–	7.9	–	–	–	5.9	22.0	7.2
2–5 Jun	Mediana	Delo	715	18.1	**21.5**	4.4	1.4	–	5.0	4.6	1.8	–	4.0	–	1.9	2.4	3.7	–	–	–	0.7	30.3	3.4
23–26 May	Valicon	Siol	1,481	17.4	**24.0**	4.0	1.8	–	7.8	3.9	5.8	1.4	6.3	–	4.0	3.3	4.1	–	1.0	–	2.5	12.8	6.6
19–22 May	Mediana	POP	704	17.8	**21.4**	3.8	1.4	–	5.8	3.7	2.7	1.1	3.0	–	1.5	2.5	4.6	–	–	–	1.4	27.9	3.6
17 May	DD and DeSUS merge to form Party of Generations, Vlado Dimovski is elected as their leader																						
12–14 May	Ninamedia	Dnevnik	700	17.1	**25.1**	5.0	1.4	–	7.6	6.3	2.0	–	–	–	–	–	4.1	–	–	–	4.0	27.4	8.0
1–10 May	IJEK	N/A	548	**20.1**	19.9	4.4	1.0	1.3	7.6	4.9	2.0	1.7	5.1	1.3	2.6	3.2	6.1	–	1.7	–	1.6 (Note: 0.8 - Karl Erjavec - Trust Party)	14.9	0.2
5–7 May	Mediana	Delo	703	17.7	**21.0**	4.0	1.5	–	4.8	3.9	2.5	–	4.1	–	1.3	2.3	3.0	–	–	–	2.6	29.7	3.3
25–28 Apr	Valicon	Siol	1,524	18.8	**23.0**	3.8	1.7	0.4	8.4	4.6	4.6	1.5	7.1	0.4	3.2	3.3	5.6	–	1.0	–	2.0 (Note: 0.0 - Karl Erjavec - Trust Party)	11.4	4.2
26 Apr	Tina Bregant is elected as leader of the Slovenian People's Party																						
22–24 Apr	Mediana	POP	725	14.2	**19.8**	3.9	0.8	–	6.2	4.6	4.2	1.1	2.8	–	0.5	2.2	2.5	–	–	–	2.4	34.7	5.6
14–16 Apr	Ninamedia	Dnevnik	–	17.2	**24.3**	5.3	1.6	–	7.3	6.5	2.3	–	–	–	–	–	4.7	–	–	–	6.1	24.7	7.1
7–10 Apr	Parsifal	Nova24	830	11.9	**21.7**	4.3	2.7	1.3	4.1	5.1	1.8	–	3.3	0.6	0.9	–	7.1	–	2.4	–	2.0 (Note: 0.3 - Karl Erjavec - Trust Party)	30.9	9.8
31 Mar–4 Apr	Mediana	Delo	723	12.5	**23.1**	2.2	0.8	–	5.4	5.0	2.6	–	4.9	–	1.2	1.4	4.3	–	–	–	2.8	33.3	10.6
17–21 Mar	Mediana	POP	720	15.2	**21.0**	4.2	1.5	–	5.3	5.2	1.4	0.3	4.9	–	2.0	1.4	3.5	–	–	–	1.9	31.3	5.8
10–12 Mar	Ninamedia	Dnevnik	–	16.6	**24.1**	5.5	1.7	–	7.0	6.1	2.9	–	–	–	–	–	3.3	–	–	–	3.4	29.4	7.5
1–10 Mar	IJEK	N/A	641	18.1	**22.2**	7.1	1.6	0.6	8.2	7.5	5.3	0.8	4.5	0.9	3.3	1.4	6.8	–	2.2	–	2.3 (Note: 1.2 - Karl Erjavec - Trust Party)	7.3	4.1
3–6 Mar	Mediana	Delo	726	15.7	**21.1**	3.8	0.4	–	6.2	3.9	2.1	–	4.3	–	2.3	1.8	4.8	–	–	–	2.3	29.7	5.4
17–20 Feb	Mediana	POP	728	13.0	**21.3**	3.9	1.5	–	7.5	3.3	3.2	0.4	3.6	–	1.2	1.6	4.8	–	–	–	2.0	31.5	8.3
14 Feb	Parsifal	Nova24	463	18.1	**29.9**	6.7	0.3	0.5	11.0	5.6	4.5	–	2.9	0.8	3.2	–	11.6	–	3.8	–	0.9 (Note: 0.9 - Karl Erjavec - Trust Party)	–	11.8
10–12 Feb	Ninamedia	Dnevnik	700	16.3	**24.0**	5.6	1.9	–	7.3	6.1	3.1	–	–	–	–	–	2.9	–	–	–	3.9	28.9	7.7
1–12 Feb	IJEK	N/A	647	15.9	**19.6**	7.0	1.4	0.9	8.5	7.8	5.1	0.7	5.9	0.4	3.1	2.5	7.0	–	1.6	–	2.4 (Note: 0.8 - Karl Erjavec - Trust Party)	10.2	3.7
3–6 Feb	Mediana	Delo	728	12.7	**23.7**	3.8	0.6	–	6.4	5.0	2.4	0.4	2.8	–	2.7	1.5	–	–	–	–	3.4 (Note: 0.7 - Our Country 0.3 - Concretely)	32.7	11.0
21–23 Jan	Mediana	POP	724	12.3	**21.1**	3.2	1.3	–	6.6	4.0	3.2	0.9	3.2	1.0	2.6	1.5	–	–	–	–	2.7 (Note: 0.6 - Our Country 0.1 - Concretely)	35.9	8.8
13–15 Jan	Ninamedia	Dnevnik	700	16.4	**24.1**	5.4	1.6	–	7.9	5.7	2.9	–	–	–	–	–	2.7	–	–	–	3.6	29.8	7.7
6–9 Jan	Mediana	Delo	726	14.4	**20.4**	5.1	2.0	–	6.0	4.3	2.1	–	3.4	0.9	1.2	1.6	–	–	–	–	3.0 (Note: 0.4 - Our Country 0.3 - Concretely)	33.7	6.0
24 Apr 2022	Election results		1,168,542	34.5	23.5	6.9	3.4 (Note: part of Let's Connect Slovenia)	–	6.7	4.4	1.5	3.4 (Note: part of Let's Connect Slovenia)	2.9	–	1.7	1.6	–	–	–	–	12.6	–	11.0

=== 2024 ===
Date(s) conducted	Pollster	Client	Sample size	GS	SDS	NSi	SD	Levica	SLS	ZS	RES	DD	PIR	SNS	Vesna	DEM	GU	Others	Und.	Lead
16–19 Dec	Mediana	POP	739	14.8	**21.7**	4.1	6.4	5.4	1.2	1.1	3.1	0.6	1.4	0.8	1.0	–	–	2.7	34.5	6.9
9–11 Dec	Ninamedia	Dnevnik	700	16.0	**23.7**	5.1	8.1	6.4	1.3	–	–	–	–	–	3.3	2.1	–	4.1	29.9	7.7
7 Dec	Pirate Party elects Jasmin Feratović as their leader																			
2–5 Dec	Mediana	Delo	724	14.0	**20.3**	4.7	6.7	3.8	1.6	–	3.8	1.1	2.1	1.8	4.6	–	–	2.8	32.0	6.3
27 Nov	Karl Erjavec founds Karl Erjavec - Trust Party																			
18–21 Nov	Mediana	POP	737	15.0	**20.6**	4.0	7.6	5.0	2.0	0.5	2.5	0.0	2.5	1.1	3.6	–	–	4.7	30.6	5.6
16 Nov	Anže Logar founds Democrats																			
11–13 Nov	Ninamedia	Dnevnik	700	14.9	**25.1**	6.1	7.6	5.9	1.6	–	–	–	–	–	3.3	2.6	–	0.4	32.6	10.2
4–7 Nov	Mediana	Delo	722	12.4	**21.6**	4.4	6.0	5.0	3.4	–	2.2	0.2	1.2	1.9	3.9	–	–	3.0	32.6	9.2
21–24 Oct	Mediana	POP	725	11.7	**22.2**	4.5	6.6	4.9	0.8	0.5	3.2	1.0	2.0	2.0	3.5	–	–	3.2	32.7	10.5
14–16 Oct	Ninamedia	Dnevnik	700	15.6	**24.1**	5.9	7.0	6.1	2.1	–	–	–	–	–	3.1	3.3	–	4.0	28.7	8.5
4 Oct	Parsifal	Nova24	700	13.1	**25.6**	5.1	7.0	3.1	2.7	–	2.5	–	1.7	–	3.7	–	3.9	2.5 (Note: 2.3 - Democratic Party of Pensioners of Slovenia)	29.0	12.5
30 Sep–3 Oct	Mediana	Delo	724	16.6	**22.4**	4.9	6.6	3.6	1.3	–	2.8	1.7	1.9	2.0	3.2	–	–	0.8	30.0	5.8
16–19 Sep	Mediana	POP	720	15.2	**24.7**	4.5	5.5	4.4	2.5	0.8	2.1	1.5	2.8	1.7	3.1	–	–	2.1	28.1	9.5
9–11 Sep	Ninamedia	Dnevnik	700	17.0	**24.0**	6.0	8.0	5.3	2.6	–	–	–	–	–	3.3	–	–	3.6	30.2	7.0
2–5 Sep	Mediana	Delo	718	15.5	**22.9**	4.9	6.6	4.8	3.1	–	2.6	0.9	2.0	1.3	2.4	–	–	0.8	29.6	7.4
20–22 Aug	Mediana	POP	718	17.7	**23.6**	4.2	6.8	3.8	1.3	0.2	1.6	0.4	1.8	1.1	4.2	–	–	1.2	31.5	5.9
12–14 Aug	Ninamedia	Dnevnik	700	17.1	**23.1**	5.9	8.1	4.9	2.6	–	–	–	–	–	3.7	–	–	1.4	33.1	6.0
5–8 Aug	Mediana	Delo	722	15.7	**22.6**	5.6	5.4	4.7	2.3	–	3.2	1.5	3.2	0.8	3.8	–	–	1.3	27.8	6.9
22–25 Jul	Mediana	POP	717	18.0	**22.7**	3.8	5.8	3.8	2.1	0.6	2.7	1.6	2.5	0.5	3.8	–	–	1.5	29.3	4.7
15–17 Jul	Ninamedia	Dnevnik	700	16.1	**23.0**	5.9	8.3	5.1	–	–	–	–	–	–	–	–	–	5.9	35.7	6.9
2–4 Jul	Mediana	Delo	734	15.8	**22.9**	4.5	7.0	3.2	2.2	–	3.1	0.6	2.2	2.1	4.9	–	–	0.6	29.3	7.1
18–20 Jun	Mediana	POP	803	17.6	**21.8**	5.6	5.0	3.7	3.3	0.5	3.1	1.2	1.7	1.6	4.1	–	–	2.5	27.1	4.2
17–19 Jun	Ninamedia	Dnevnik	700	14.6	**23.8**	6.1	7.2	4.9	2.7	–	–	–	–	–	2.4	–	–	4.2	34.1	9.2
9 Jun	**2024 European Parliament election**			22.1	**30.6**	7.6	7.8	4.8	7.2	1.6	4.0	2.2	—	—	10.5	–	–	1.5 (Note: 1.5 - None of the above)	—	8.48
3–6 Jun	Mediana	Delo	734	19.5	**24.3**	3.6	5.4	4.6	3.0	–	3.5	0.5	1.8	3.2	3.4	–	–	0.9	24.9	4.8
21–24 May	Mediana	POP	713	15.3	**18.8**	5.6	6.3	3.2	1.0	–	4.1	0.8	2.7	1.2	3.2	–	–	2.0	33.9	3.5
13–15 May	Ninamedia	Dnevnik	700	15.4	**23.4**	5.9	8.1	5.0	–	–	–	–	–	–	–	–	–	7.7	34.5	8.0
7–10 May		Delo	719	17.3	**23.1**	5.6	4.8	4.8	2.1	–	1.9	0.8	1.6	2.7	4.1	–	–	1.0	28.9	5.8
23–25 Apr	Mediana	POP	723	17.4	**23.8**	5.2	4.9	4.3	1.3	–	2.5	1.0	3.1	2.4	2.9	–	–	2.3	27.9	6.4
13 Apr	Social Democrats elects Matjaž Han as their leader																			
8–10 Apr	Ninamedia	Dnevnik	700	15.4	**22.3**	6.6	6.4	4.9	–	–	–	–	–	–	–	–	–	2.0	42.4	6.9
2–4 Apr	Mediana	Delo	714	15.0	**23.0**	5.3	5.4	2.9	1.6	–	2.8	0.6	2.1	2.3	2.0	–	–	2.5	32.7	8.0
22 Mar	Violeta Tomić founds None of the above																			
19–21 Mar	Mediana	POP	712	14.3	**21.5**	4.6	5.6	2.8	2.2	–	1.9	0.8	3.1	1.8	1.1	–	–	2.6	36.8	7.2
11–14 Mar	Ninamedia	Dnevnik	700	14.1	**23.1**	6.1	4.1	4.8	–	–	–	–	–	–	–	–	–	3.3	44.5	9.0
5–7 Mar	Mediana	Delo	723	15.0	**22.9**	4.9	4.4	4.4	1.0	–	2.7	0.7	3.2	2.9	1.7	–	–	–	31.3	7.9
20–22 Feb	Mediana	POP	724	15.1	**21.8**	4.6	3.0	4.8	1.3	–	2.8	0.3	2.9	1.7	2.4	–	–	2.1	35.3	6.7
12–14 Feb	Ninamedia	Dnevnik	700	10.7	**24.0**	6.3	3.9	5.9	–	–	–	–	–	–	–	–	–	3.1	46.1	13.3
5–8 Feb	Mediana	Delo	720	16.8	**23.7**	5.1	2.6	5.3	1.3	–	2.4	0.1	2.3	1.9	2.4	–	–	0.4	33.6	6.9
22–25 Jan	Mediana	POP	716	13.7	**23.4**	4.3	8.7	5.2	1.2	–	1.4	0.3	2.5	2.4	1.1	–	–	2.3	32.7	9.7
20 Jan	Pavel Rupar founds Pavel Rupar's Voice of Pensioners																			
10–11 Jan	Ninamedia	Dnevnik	700	15.3	**22.4**	6.4	8.1	6.1	–	–	–	–	–	–	–	–	–	2.0	39.5	7.1
1–4 Jan	Mediana	Delo	715	14.6	**21.7**	4.6	7.5	4.4	2.9	–	1.3	1.1	3.4	1.6	2.1	–	–	0.7	31.5	7.1
24 Apr 2022	Election results		1,168,542	34.5	23.5	6.9	6.7	4.4	3.4 (Note: part of Let's Connect Slovenia)		2.9	1.7	1.6	1.5	1.5	–	–	13.2	–	11.0

=== 2023 ===
Date(s) conducted	Pollster	Client	Sample size	GS	SDS	NSi	SD	Levica	SLS	RES	DD	PIR	SNS	Vesna	Others	Und.	Lead
18–21 Dec	Mediana	POP	717	15.6	**24.9**	3.5	6.4	5.0	1.6	2.1	1.0	2.2	0.8	1.0	4.0 (Note: 0.8 - Our Country 0.0 Concretely)	31.3	9.3
11–14 Dec	Ninamedia	Dnevnik	700	16.7	**22.6**	6.1	7.3	5.0	–	–	–	–	–	–	3.4	38.8	5.9
4–7 Dec	Mediana	Delo	732	13.4	**20.8**	4.5	8.0	4.7	1.8	2.6	0.7	2.4	3.3	1.3	1.0 (Note: 0.6 - Our Country 0.4 Concretely)	32.2	7.4
20–24 Nov	Mediana	POP	714	13.4	**22.1**	3.8	8.4	3.9	2.0	2.0	1.0	1.5	1.8	0.5	1.1 (Note: 0.4 - Our Country 0.2 Concretely)	37.7	8.7
13–15 Nov	Parsifal	Nova24	700	17.1	**28.5**	8.4	8.7	4.8	–	–	–	–	–	–	9.1	23.6	11.4
13–15 Nov	Ninamedia	Dnevnik	700	16.3	**22.4**	6.4	7.9	5.1	–	–	–	–	–	–	1.3	40.6	6.1
6–9 Nov	Mediana	Delo	705	14.4	**22.2**	7.2	7.0	4.1	0.7	2.8	0.5	2.7	2.2	1.6	1.7 (Note: 1.0 - Our Country 0.5 Concretely)	32.2	7.8
27 Oct	Ninamedia	Dnevnik	518	19.9	**22.2**	7.5	7.3	6.2	–	–	–	–	–	–	3.9	32.1	5.1
17–19 Oct	Mediana	POP	716	18.6	**23.7**	5.3	7.4	3.4	1.4	2.5	1.0	1.1	1.2	0.7	1.2 (Note: 0.8 Concretely 0.1 - Our Country)	32.1	5.1
9–11 Oct	Ninamedia	Dnevnik	700	20.3	**21.9**	7.7	7.0	4.9	–	–	–	–	–	–	2.9	35.5	1.6
2–5 Oct	Mediana	Delo	723	18.8	**23.0**	7.2	7.0	5.1	1.6	2.5	0.3	1.9	1.4	1.1	2.1 (Note: 1.6 - Greens of Slovenia 0.3 - Concretely 0.2 - Our Country)	28.4	4.2
19–21 Sep	Mediana	POP	715	20.8	**21.0**	4.5	5.5	5.9	0.8	2.8	1.1	1.9	0.8	1.7	1.1 (Note: 0.3 - Our Country 0.0 - Concretely)	31.6	0.2
11–13 Sep	Ninamedia	Dnevnik	700	**22.6**	20.5	8.1	6.7	5.0	–	–	–	–	–	–	1.1	36.1	2.1
4–9 Sep	Parsifal	Nova24	715	20.0	**22.5**	7.3	5.6	4.9	–	–	–	–	–	–	10.2 (Note: 0.3 - Pavel Rupar's Voice of Pensioners)	26.3	3.2
4–7 Sep	Mediana	Delo	715	**24.3**	21.1	5.8	6.7	4.3	1.3	2.5	0.3	2.0	1.9	1.3	2.1	26.3	3.2
2 Sep	Asta Vrečko is elected as coordinator of The Left																
22–24 Aug	Mediana	POP	715	**22.6**	22.3	4.1	6.7	3.9	2.0	2.4	0.1	2.8	0.5	1.6	2.0 (Note: 0.8 - Our Country 0.1 - Concretely)	28.4	0.3
16–17 Aug	Ninamedia	Dnevnik	700	23.7	**23.9**	6.8	6.6	4.9	–	–	–	–	–	–	1.3	32.8	0.2
7–10 Aug	Mediana	Delo	710	22.0	**23.6**	4.5	6.6	6.5	0.9	2.9	0.3	1.7	0.9	1.0	1.9	26.4	1.6
17–20 Jul	Mediana	POP	716	22.7	**23.2**	6.2	6.3	4.3	1.3	2.8	0.4	1.4	1.1	0.9	1.7 (Note: 0.1 - Our Country 0.1 - Concretely)	27.7	0.5
10–12 Jul	Ninamedia	Dnevnik	700	**26.0**	20.9	6.8	7.6	5.2	–	–	–	–	–	–	2.4	31.2	5.1
3–6 Jul	Mediana	Delo	706	**23.0**	22.3	4.8	5.6	4.4	1.0	1.5	0.7	2.2	1.9	1.9	3.0	24.9	0.7
26 Jun	Janez Demšar is elected as leader of Concretely																
20–22 Jun	Mediana	POP	719	21.0	**21.8**	6.3	6.7	6.1	1.6	1.9	0.7	1.9	0.7	2.0	1.0 (Note: 0.5 - Our Country 0.0 - Concretely)	28.3	0.8
12–14 Jun	Ninamedia	Dnevnik	700	**25.1**	20.1	6.9	8.9	4.8	–	–	–	–	–	–	2.3	31.9	5.0
5–8 Jun	Parsifal	Nova24	725	**21.5**	20.0	5.9	8.8	6.4	–	–	–	–	–	–	4.7 (Note: 2.1 - Voice of Slovenian Pensioners)	32.8	1.5
5–8 Jun	Mediana	Delo	712	**21.8**	20.2	4.9	7.0	3.8	1.9	2.4	0.4	3.3	1.6	1.5	1.1	28.8	1.6
22–25 May	Mediana	POP	710	**25.6**	20.6	5.1	6.1	3.9	1.0	2.1	1.2	1.4	0.2	1.2	2.4 (Note: 0.7 - Concretely 0.2 - Our Country)	28.6	5.0
8–10 May	Ninamedia	Dnevnik	700	**24.8**	21.7	6.9	7.0	4.7	–	–	–	–	–	–	2.3	32.2	3.1
3–4 May	Mediana	Delo	716	**23.8**	20.9	7.1	6.0	5.2	0.8	2.5	0.6	2.0	2.3	2.5	1.3	22.5	2.9
17–20 Apr	Mediana	POP	717	**24.4**	22.2	5.7	6.6	4.2	3.1	3.6	0.7	2.1	1.3	1.4	0.8 (Note: 0.3 - Our Country 0.0 - Concretely)	22.0	2.2
11–13 Apr	Ninamedia	Dnevnik	700	**25.1**	23.1	6.7	7.2	4.5	–	–	–	–	–	–	4.7	28.7	2.0
3–7 Apr	Mediana	Delo	707	23.0	**23.3**	5.6	6.2	5.1	1.6	1.6	0.9	1.7	2.4	1.5	1.8	24.1	0.3
20–23 Mar	Mediana	POP	721	**23.5**	22.8	5.1	6.6	5.2	1.4	2.5	0.0	1.5	1.6	1.1	0.5 (Note: 0.0 - Our Country 0.0 - Concretely)	26.7	0.7
13–15 Mar	Ninamedia	Dnevnik	700	**24.9**	22.9	6.9	6.6	4.6	–	–	–	–	–	–	1.6	32.7	2.0
6–9 Mar	Mediana	Delo	715	**26.8**	21.6	6.0	7.2	4.0	1.1	2.4	1.2	1.7	1.1	1.0	2.4 (Note: 1.2 - Concretely 0.6 - Our Country)	22.1	5.2
4 Mar	Homeland League ceases to exist																
21–23 Feb	Mediana	POP	717	**26.8**	22.2	6.4	5.1	5.0	1.1	2.7	1.7	1.9	1.0	1.6	1.5	22.2	4.6
18 Feb	New People's Party of Slovenia merges into Slovenian Democratic Party																
9–12 Feb	Ninamedia	Dnevnik	700	**26.1**	20.1	7.1	7.1	6.2	–	–	–	–	–	–	3.2	30.2	6.0
6–10 Feb	Mediana	Delo	706	**27.6**	19.8	5.8	5.4	6.2	1.8	3.2	1.0	1.8	1.4	1.6	1.0	21.3	7.8
16–19 Jan	Mediana	POP	715	**28.3**	20.3	5.5	6.1	3.7	1.5	1.5	0.9	1.9	1.0	1.4	2.6 (Note: 1.0 - Our Country 0.4 - Concretely)	24.9	8.0
9–12 Jan	Ninamedia	Dnevnik	700	**27.8**	22.5	9.1	8.3	6.3	–	–	–	–	–	–	3.2	23.4	5.3
3–5 Jan	Mediana	Delo	715	**29.1**	21.7	5.5	7.1	4.6	0.9	1.8	1.0	1.6	1.2	1.6	1.2	22.7	7.4
24 Apr 2022	Election results		1,168,542	34.5	23.5	6.9	6.7	4.4	3.4 (Note: part of Let's Connect Slovenia)	2.9	1.7	1.6	1.5	1.5	13.2	–	11.0

=== 2022 ===
Date(s) conducted	Pollster	Client	Sample size	GS	SDS	NSi	SD	Levica	SLS	KON	RES	DD	PIR	ND	SNS	Vesna	Others	Und.	Lead
19–22 Dec	Mediana	POP	719	29.9	18.6	8.5	6.8	4.9	1.8	0.5	3.1	1.1	1.7	0.9	1.5	1.6	0.5	17.5	11.3
12–14 Dec	Ninamedia	Dnevnik	700	29.2	21.6	8.9	8.2	5.2	–	–	–	–	–	–	–	–	1.7	25.2	7.6
5–8 Dec	Mediana	Delo	718	34.1	18.7	7.2	6.5	3.6	1.3	0.0	3.0	0.3	1.2	0.4	0.8	1.6	0.7	18.1	15.4
4 Dec	Second round of local elections is held																		
21–24 Nov	Mediana	POP	723	33.6	20.1	6.5	6.5	4.2	2.6	0.1	2.2	1.0	2.0	0.7	2.1	0.8	1.3	16.1	13.5
20 Nov	First round of local elections is held																		
13 Nov	Nataša Pirc Musar (IND) wins the presidency																		
7–11 Nov	Ninamedia	Dnevnik	700	31.3	23.8	9.7	8.3	5.8	–	–	–	–	–	–	–	–	2.7	18.4	7.5
7–9 Nov	Mediana	Delo	718	31.0	22.6	7.0	6.0	4.7	1.1	0.6	2.2	1.1	1.5	0.9	1.1	1.2	1.1	15.0	8.4
23 Oct	Anže Logar (SDS) and Nataša Pirc Musar (IND) qualify for the second round of the presidential election																		
17–19 Oct	Mediana	POP	724	30.0	17.9	7.7	7.4	5.2	0.4	0.2	3.5	1.6	1.1	1.0	1.9	1.2	1.0	19.3	12.1
10–14 Oct	Parsifal	Nova24	705	24.8	23.7	8.2	6.6	5.0	–	–	–	–	–	–	–	–	5.4	26.4	1.1
10–12 Oct	Ninamedia	Dnevnik	700	29.8	24.1	9.8	8.0	6.0	–	–	–	–	–	–	–	–	2.7	21.2	5.7
10 Oct	Let's Connect Slovenia ceases to exist																		
3–6 Oct	Mediana	Delo	719	29.2	21.9	6.4	5.9	5.7	1.3	1.1	3.2	1.1	1.7	0.5	0.8	0.8	1.0	16.6	7.3
26–28 Sep	Parsifal	Planet	721	37.4	29.1	9.4	8.6	5.9	0.8	–	3.2	–	2.1	1.0	0.8	–	–	–	8.3
19–22 Sep	Mediana	POP	729	30.9	17.9	4.8	5.6	4.4	0.8	0.6	3.6	1.2	1.2	1.2	1.7	1.4	1.3	23.1	13.0
12–15 Sep	Ninamedia	Dnevnik	700	33.4	23.9	9.0	6.8	4.7	–	–	–	–	–	–	–	–	2.0	20.2	9.5
5–8 Sep	Mediana	Delo	723	29.9	21.7	8.1	6.4	4.9	2.0	0.0	2.7	1.5	2.3	0.3	1.8	0.7	1.2	16.3	8.2
30 Aug–2 Sep	Parsifal	Nova24	703	29.3	22.5	7.3	6.6	3.6	–	–	–	–	–	–	–	–	4.9	25.7	6.8
29–31 Aug	Parsifal	Planet	704	25.9	22.4	4.9	4.4	3.0	0.5	–	2.2	–	2.6	–	1.7	2.0	–	30.4	3.5
22–25 Aug	Mediana	POP	721	31.4	23.4	5.5	5.0	5.3	0.8	0.0	3.0	0.7	1.6	0.4	1.3	1.0	1.6	18.7	8.0
8–10 Aug	Ninamedia	Dnevnik	700	33.8	23.7	8.1	5.3	4.9	–	–	–	–	–	–	–	–	1.1	23.1	10.1
12–14 Jul	Ninamedia	Dnevnik	700	33.1	22.2	7.9	5.5	5.1	–	–	–	–	–	–	–	–	3.6	22.6	10.9
12 Jul	Party of Alenka Bratušek and List of Marjan Šarec merge into Freedom Movement																		
4–7 Jul	Mediana	Delo	716	30.2	18.9	6.8	7.0	4.7	2.7		2.4	1.1	2.4	0.5	0.5	1.3	1.9 (Note: 1.7 - For a Healthy Society)	17.6	11.3
2 Jul	Marko Balažic is elected as leader of Slovenian People's Party																		
22–24 Jun	Parsifal	Nova24	727	30.3	22.6	6.6	6.8	3.7	–		–	–	–	–	–	–	5.2	24.8	7.7
20–23 Jun	Mediana	POP	719	28.4	18.9	6.8	5.2	4.1	–		2.9		–	–	–	–	6.0 (Note: 2.3 - List of Marjan Šarec 1.9 - Party of Alenka Bratušek)	18.0	9.5
14–16 Jun	Ninamedia	Dnevnik	700	33.1	21.9	6.7	5.8	5.9	1.8		0.7	–	–	–	0.4	0.4	4.9 (Note: 2.3 - List of Marjan Šarec 1.9 - Party of Alenka Bratušek 0.2 - Democratic Party of Pensioners of Slovenia)	18.4	11.2
6–9 Jun	Mediana	Delo	714	31.0	21.4	7.1	5.8	4.2	1.6		2.0	0.8	1.6	1.7	0.6	0.8	4.6 (Note: 2.3 - List of Marjan Šarec 1.9 - Party of Alenka Bratušek)	11.4	9.6
25 May	Robert Golob is elected as the 13th Prime Minister of Slovenia																		
16–19 May	Parsifal	Nova24	703	30.4	24.8	8.8	5.6	4.8	–		–	–	–	–	–	–	8.7 (Note: 4.0 - List of Marjan Šarec 2.0 - Party of Alenka Bratušek)	16.8	8.2
16–19 May	Mediana	POP	724	30.6	19.7	4.3	6.9	4.1	2.9		2.9	1.9	1.7	1.6	0.9	1.3	6.0 (Note: 2.1 - List of Marjan Šarec 1.5 - Party of Alenka Bratušek 1.2 - For a Healthy Society)	11.4	10.9
13 May	Urška Klakočar Zupančič is elected as speaker of the National Assembly																		
10–12 May	Ninamedia	Dnevnik	700	38.4	19.9	5.8	6.0	5.5	1.7		–	–	1.3	–	–	1.0	4.6 (Note: 2.5 - List of Marjan Šarec 0.8 - Democratic Party of Pensioners of Slovenia)	13.3	18.5
9 May (Note: Publication date)	Mediana	Delo	–	36.9	25.3	8.5	6.2	5.9	2.8		1.0	0.8	0.6	1.0	1.3	1.5	8.3 (Note: 2.9 - List of Marjan Šarec 2.7 - Party of Alenka Bratušek)	38.8	11.4
24 Apr	Election results		1,168,542	34.5	23.5	6.9	6.7	4.4	3.4		2.9	1.7	1.6	1.5	1.5	1.4	11.8 (Note: 2.9 - List of Marjan Šarec 2.7 - Party of Alenka Bratušek)	–	11.0

Notes;

== Seat projection ==
46 seats needed for a majority.

=== MRP polls ===
Month published	Pollster	Client	GS	SDS	NSi	SLS	FOKUS	SD	Levica	Vesna	RES	DEM	PVP	PIR	Others (Note: 2 seats are reserved for MPs of the Italian and Hungarian minorities.)
Mar 2026	2026 Election		29	28	9			6	5		5	6	0	0	2
Mar 2026	Valicon	Siol	28	25	7			9	8		4	7	0	0	2
Mar 2026	Ninamedia	Dnevnik	29	25	8			8	8		4	6	0	0	2
Mar 2026	IJEK	N/A	23	26	10			8	8		7	6	0	0	2
Mar 2026	Mediana	POP & RTV	28	28	8			5	7		5	7	0	0	2
Mar 2026	Valicon	Siol	26	23	7			7	8		4	9	0	4	2
Mar 2026	IJEK	N/A	20	27	10			12	7		5	7	0	0	2
Mar 2026	Odmev	Volilna napoved	20	28	10			11	7		5	7	0	0	2
Mar 2026	Odmev	Volilna napoved	24	29	8			9	6		4	8	0	0	2
Mar 2026	Mediana	RTV	25	31	7			6	8		4	7	0	0	2
Mar 2026	Ninamedia	Dnevnik	27	26	8			8	8		4	7	0	0	2
Mar 2026	Odmev	Volilna napoved	23	28	8			9	7		4	9	0	0	2
Mar 2026	Valicon	Siol	24	25	7			9	8		4	11	0	0	2
Mar 2026	Odmev	Volilna napoved	23	33	9			9	6		0	8	0	0	2
Mar 2026	Odmev	Volilna napoved	27	29	8			9	7		0	8	0	0	2
Mar 2026	Odmev	Volilna napoved	24	31	8			9	8		0	8	0	0	2
Mar 2026	Mediana	POP	26	30	6			6	10		4	6	0	0	2
Feb 2026	Valicon	Siol	27	27	6			9	7		0	8	4	0	2
Feb 2026	Odmev	Volilna napoved	24	30	9			9	8		0	8	0	0	2
Feb 2026	Mediana	RTV	23	30	9			9	6		4	6	0	0	2
Feb 2026	IJEK	N/A	22	29	8			8	10		4	7	0	0	2
Feb 2026	Ninamedia	Nova24	20	28	10			8	6		0	7	0	0	2
Feb 2026	Parsifal	Nova24	20	28	10			8	6		0	7	0	0	2
Feb 2026	Valicon	Siol	25	29	8			12	7		0	7	0	0	2
Feb 2026	Mediana	Delo	22	29	9			10	7		0	11	0	0	2
Jan 2026	Mediana	POP	20	29	7			8	8		4	7	0	5	2
Jan 2026	Valicon	N/A	24	26	7			10	8		4	9	0	0	2
Jan 2026	IJEK	N/A	20	28	9			9	10		4	8	0	0	2
Jan 2026	Mediana	RTV	24	29	6	0	0	9	7		6	7	0	0	2
Jan 2026	Ninamedia	Dnevnik	24	29	6	0	0	9	7		6	7	0	0	2
Jan 2026	Odmev	Volilna napoved	24	30	7	0	0	8	7		5	7	0	0	2
Dec 2025	Odmev	Volilna napoved	25	31	7	0	0	9	5		4	7	0	0	2
Nov 2025	Odmev	Volilna napoved	25	32	7	0	0	8	6	0	0	6	4	0	2
Oct 2025	Odmev	Volilna napoved	24	32	6	0	0	9	6	0	4	7	0	0	2
Sep 2025	Odmev	Volilna napoved	24	32	6	0	0	9	6	0	4	7	0	0	2
Aug 2025	Odmev	Volilna napoved	24	31	6	0	0	9	6	0	4	7	0	0	2
Jul 2025	Odmev	Volilna napoved	24	32	6	0	0	10	5	0	5	6	0	0	2
Jun 2025	Odmev	Volilna napoved	24	33	6	0	0	8	5	0	5	7	0	0	2
May 2025	Odmev	Volilna napoved	25	31	6	0	0	9	6	0	5	6	0	0	2
Apr 2025	Odmev	Volilna napoved	18	33	5	0	0	9	7	4	5	7	0	0	2
Mar 2025	Odmev	Volilna napoved	23	31	7	0	0	9	8	0	4	6	0	0	2
Feb 2025	Odmev	Volilna napoved	20	33	7	0	0	11	7	4	0	6	0	0	2
Jan 2025	Odmev	Volilna napoved	23	36	7	0	0	11	7	4	0	0	0	0	2
Dec 2024	Odmev	Volilna napoved	23	34	6	0	0	10	7	4	0	4	0	0	2
Nov 2024	Odmev	Volilna napoved	21	37	7	0	0	11	7	5	0	0	0	0	2
Oct 2024	Odmev	Volilna napoved	22	37	8	0	0	10	6	4	0	0	0	0	2
Sep 2024	Odmev	Volilna napoved	24	36	7	0	0	10	7	4	0	0	0	0	2
Aug 2024	Odmev	Volilna napoved	25	35	7	0	0	10	6	5	0	0	0	0	2
Jul 2024	Odmev	Volilna napoved	27	37	7	0	0	11	6	0	0	0	0	0	2
Jun 2024	Odmev	Volilna napoved	25	34	7	4	0	8	6	4	0	0	0	0	2
May 2024	Odmev	Volilna napoved	25	31	6	0	0	9	6	0	5	6	0	0	2
Apr 2024	Odmev	Volilna napoved	25	39	9	0	0	8	7	0	0	0	0	0	2
Mar 2024	Odmev	Volilna napoved	25	39	9	0	0	8	7	0	0	0	0	0	2
Feb 2024	Odmev	Volilna napoved	23	41	9	0	0	5	9	0	0	0	0	0	2
Jan 2024	Odmev	Volilna napoved	23	36	8	0	0	13	8	0	0	0	0	0	2
Dec 2023	Odmev	Volilna napoved	25	37	7	0	0	11	8	0	0	0	0	0	2
Nov 2023	Odmev	Volilna napoved	24	37	9	0	0	12	6	0	0	0	0	0	2
Oct 2023	Odmev	Volilna napoved	28	33	10	0	0	10	7	0	0	0	0	0	2
Sep 2023	Odmev	Volilna napoved	33	30	9	0	0	9	7	0	0	0	0	0	2
Aug 2023	Odmev	Volilna napoved	32	33	7	0	0	9	7	0	0	0	0	0	2
Jul 2023	Odmev	Volilna napoved	34	31	0	0	8	9	6	0	0	0	0	0	2
Jun 2023	Odmev	Volilna napoved	32	30	8	0	0	11	7	0	0	0	0	0	2
May 2023	Odmev	Volilna napoved	35	29	9	0	0	9	6	0	0	0	0	0	2
Apr 2023	Odmev	Volilna napoved	33	32	8	0	0	9	6	0	0	0	0	0	2
Mar 2023	Odmev	Volilna napoved	34	30	8	0	0	9	7	0	0	0	0	0	2
Feb 2023	Odmev	Volilna napoved	37	28	8	0	0	8	7	0	0	0	0	0	2
Jan 2023	Odmev	Volilna napoved	37	28	8	0	0	9	6	0	0	0	0	0	2
Dec 2022	Odmev	Volilna napoved	39	25	10	0	0	9	5	0	0	0	0	0	2
Nov 2022	Odmev	Volilna napoved	37	27	9	0	0	9	6	0	0	0	0	0	2
Oct 2022	Odmev	Volilna napoved	38	26	9	0	0	8	7	0	0	0	0	0	2
Sep 2022	Odmev	Volilna napoved	40	27	9	0	0	7	5	0	0	0	0	0	2
Aug 2022	Odmev	Volilna napoved	39	29	8	0	0	7	5	0	0	0	0	0	2
July 2022	Odmev	Volilna napoved	39	26	9	0	0	8	6	0	0	0	0	0	2
June 2022	Odmev	Volilna napoved	40	27	8	0	0	7	6	0	0	0	0	0	2
May 2022	Odmev	Volilna napoved	41	26	8	0	0	7	6	0	0	0	0	0	2
Apr 2022	2022 Election		41	27	8	0	0	7	5	0	0	0	0	0	2

== Leadership polls ==
=== Preferred prime minister ===
Poll results showing public opinion on who would make the best prime minister or who is better positioned to win are shown in the table below in reverse chronological order, showing the most recent first.

Polling firm/Link	Fieldwork date	Janez Janša	Robert Golob	Anže Logar	Matjaž Han	Und.	Lead
Ninamedia	12–14 Jan 2026	30.7	28.7	19.4	9.7	—N/a	2.0

=== Cabinet approval/disapproval ratings ===
Poll results showing public opinion on the performance of the Government are shown in the table below in reverse chronological order, showing the most recent first.

Polling firm/Link	Fieldwork date	Sample size	Robert Golob's cabinet			
Polling firm/Link	Fieldwork date	Sample size	Approve	Disapprove	Undecided	Net
Mediana	23–26 Feb 2026	719	39	48	12	9.0
Ninamedia	9–11 Feb 2026	1000	41.9	52.3	5.9	10.4
Mediana	26–29 Jan 2026	725	36	53	10	17.0
Ninamedia	12–14 Jan 2026	700	38.3	57.3	4.4	19.0
Mediana	8–11 Dec 2025	715	32.0	53.8	14.2	21.8
Mediana	24–27 Nov 2025	710	34.2	52.7	13.1	18.5
Ninamedia	10–12 Nov 2025	700	36.6	57.0	6.4	20.5
Mediana	20–23 Oct 2025	709	33.6	53.2	13.2	19.6
Parsifal	20–22 Oct 2025	700	28.7	64.3	7.0	35.6
Ninamedia	13–15 Oct 2025	700	36.6	57.1	6.3	20.4
Mediana	22–25 Sep 2025	700	35.1	51.5	13.3	16.4
Ninamedia	8–10 Sep 2025	700	38.9	56.7	4.4	17.8
Mediana	18–21 Aug 2025	706	33.9	53.3	12.8	19.4
Ninamedia	11–13 Aug 2025	700	40.6	54.3	5.1	13.7
Mediana	21–24 Jul 2025	728	34.6	54.0	11.4	19.4
Ninamedia	7–9 Jul 2025	700	39.1	56.3	4.6	17.2
Mediana	16–19 Jun 2025	712	32.5	56.0	11.4	23.5
Parsifal	10–12 Jun 2025	700	30.7	60.8	8.6	30.1
Ninamedia	9–11 Jun 2025	700	36.3	58.1	5.6	22.1
Mediana	19–22 May 2025	704	31.3	54.8	13.9	23.5
Ninamedia	12–14 May 2025	700	37.0	59.4	3.6	22.4
Mediana	22-24 Apr 2025	725	32.3	52.3	15.4	20.0
Ninamedia	14–16 Apr 2025	700	36.1	59.2	4.7	23.1
Parsifal	7–10 Apr 2025	700	30.0	58.7	11.3	28.7
Mediana	21-24 Mar 2025	716	30.8	59.2	10.0	28.4
Ninamedia	10–12 Mar 2025	700	34.7	60.2	5.1	25.5
Mediana	17-20 Feb 2025	728	28.4	59.0	12.6	30.6
Parsifal	14 Feb 2025	700	29.8	59.0	11.2	29.2
Ninamedia	10–12 Feb 2025	700	31.6	63.8	4.6	32.2
Mediana	21-23 Jan 2025	724	29.4	54.5	16.2	25.1
Ninamedia	13–15 Jan 2025	700	33.5	62.4	4.1	28.9
Mediana	16-19 Dec 2024	739	32.9	51.6	15.5	18.7
Ninamedia	9-11 Dec 2024	700	33.6	62.6	3.9	29.0
Mediana	18-21 Nov 2024	737	36.3	50.2	13.5	13.9
Ninamedia	14-16 Nov 2024	700	28.4	67.4	4.1	39.0
Mediana	21-24 Oct 2024	725	26.3	58.3	15.4	32.0
Ninamedia	14-16 Oct 2024	700	31.9	64.3	3.9	32.4
Parsifal	4 Oct 2024	700	30.7	62.9	–	32.2
Mediana	16-19 Sep 2024	720	31.9	52.1	16.0	20.2
Ninamedia	9-11 Sep 2024	700	32.6	63.0	4.4	30.4
Mediana	20-22 Aug 2024	718	36.2	46.6	17.2	10.2
Ninamedia	12-14 Aug 2024	700	36.9	58.4	4.7	21.5
Mediana	22-25 Jul 2024	717	36.2	51.6	12.2	15.4
Ninamedia	15-17 Jul 2024	700	35.1	58.6	6.3	23.5
Mediana	18-20 Jun 2024	804	36.2	51.6	12.2	15.4
Ninamedia	17-19 Jun 2024	700	33.8	62.4	3.8	28.6
Mediana	21-24 May 2024	713	32.8	53.4	13.8	20.6
Ninamedia	13-15 May 2024	700	33.4	62.3	4.3	28.9
Mediana	23-25 Apr 2024	723	35.3	52.0	12.7	16.7
Ninamedia	8-10 Apr 2024	700	30.3	65.1	4.6	34.8
Mediana	19-21 Mar 2024	712	30.7	53.3	16.0	22.6
Ninamedia	11-14 Mar 2024	700	24.4	70.3	5.3	45.9
Mediana	20-22 Feb 2024	724	30.4	55.1	14.5	24.7
Ninamedia	12-14 Feb 2024	700	24.4	70.0	5.1	45.6
Mediana	22-25 Jan 2024	716	30.8	54.8	14.5	24.0
Ninamedia	10-11 Jan 2024	700	32.9	55.4	11.7	22.5
Mediana	18-21 Dec 2023	717	34.9	51.4	13.7	16.5
Ninamedia	11-14 Dec 2023	700	31.7	53.9	14.4	22.2
Mediana	20-24 Nov 2023	714	28.4	55.4	16.2	27.0
Ninamedia	13-15 Nov 2023	700	30.1	56.3	13.6	26.2
Mediana	17-19 Oct 2023	716	40.4	46.9	12.7	6.5
Ninamedia	9-11 Oct 2023	700	39.3	53.1	14.4	13.8
Mediana	19-21 Sep 2023	715	44.9	38.9	16.2	6.0
Ninamedia	11-13 Sep 2023	700	49.3	45.4	5.3	3.9
Mediana	22-24 Aug 2023	715	51.7	34.8	13.5	16.9
Ninamedia	16-17 Aug 2023	700	51.7	44.9	3.5	6.8
Mediana	17-20 Jul 2023	716	44.1	41.6	14.3	2.5
Ninamedia	10-12 Jul 2023	700	48.8	47.6	3.6	1.2
Mediana	20-22 Jun 2023	717	43.1	46.7	10.2	3.6
Ninamedia	12-14 Jun 2023	700	50.3	43.2	6.5	7.1
Mediana	22-25 May 2023	710	46.4	40.7	12.9	2.5
Ninamedia	8-10 May 2023	700	45.8	48.2	6.0	2.4
Mediana	17-20 Apr 2023	717	45.5	41.9	12.6	3.6
Ninamedia	11-13 Apr 2023	700	46.9	47.3	5.8	0.4
Mediana	20-23 Mar 2023	721	41.5	42.4	16.0	0.9
Ninamedia	13-15 Mar 2023	700	47.6	47.3	5.1	0.3
Mediana	21-23 Feb 2023	717	46.0	40.6	13.4	5.4
Ninamedia	9-12 Feb 2023	700	50.8	43.2	6.0	7.6
Mediana	6-10 Feb 2023	706	35.0	31.4	33.6	3.6
Mediana	16-19 Jan 2023	715	50.6	35.5	13.9	15.1
Ninamedia	9-12 Jan 2023	700	46.1	47.3	6.6	1.2
Mediana	19-22 Dec 2022	719	53.5	35.2	11.4	18.3
Ninamedia	12-14 Dec 2022	700	49.3	41.0	9.7	8.3
Mediana	5-8 Dec 2022	718	45.0	26.3	28.7	18.7
Mediana	21-24 Nov 2022	723	59.2	29.0	11.8	30.2
Ninamedia	7-11 Nov 2022	700	56.3	32.6	11.1	23.7
Mediana	7-9 Nov 2022	718	42.6	28.5	28.9	14.1
Mediana	17-19 Oct 2022	724	53.1	32.2	14.7	20.9
Ninamedia	10-12 Oct 2022	700	51.7	39.6	8.7	12.1
Ninamedia	3-6 Oct 2022	700	39.5	29.2	31.3	10.3
Mediana	19-22 Sep 2022	729	58.9	30.1	11.7	30.1
Ninamedia	12-15 Sep 2022	700	58.2	28.8	12.3	28.8
Mediana	22-25 Aug 2022	721	58.4	26.7	14.9	31.7
Ninamedia	8-10 Aug 2022	700	55.5	30.6	13.9	24.9
Mediana	18-21 Jul 2022	728	51.4	33.5	15.1	17.9
Ninamedia	12-14 Jul 2022	700	51.8	32.5	15.7	19.3
Mediana	4-7 Jul 2022	716	21.3	65.0	14.0	43.7
Mediana	20-23 Jun 2022	719	53.1	31.6	15.4	21.5
Ninamedia	14-16 Jun 2022	700	37.5	17.2	45.4	20.3
Mediana	6-9 Jun 2022	714	28.0	37.3	34.7	9.3
