= Opinion polling for the next Slovenian parliamentary election =

In the run-up to the Next Slovenian parliamentary election, various organisations carry out opinion polling to gauge voting intention in Slovenia. Results of such polls are displayed in this article.

The date range for these opinion polls are from the previous parliamentary election, held on 22 March 2026, to the present day. The next parliamentary election is scheduled to be held no later than four years since the previous one.

== Pollsters ==
Public opinion polls on voting intention in Slovenia are mainly conducted regularly by five agencies:

- Mediana, which conducts separate public opinion polls for the newspaper Delo, RTV Slovenia and for the television channel POP TV and its respective multimedia web portal 24ur.com;
- Ninamedia, which conducts the Vox Populi public opinion polls for the newspaper Dnevnik and Večer;
- Parsifal SC, which conducts public opinion polls for the conservative news media enterprise Nova24TV, owned by members of right-wing SDS;
- Research Center IJEK, which conducts the Pulse of Society public opinion polls and is the think tank of centre-right NSi;
- Valicon, which conducts polls for Siol.net.

== Graphical summary ==
The following graph depicts the evolution of standings of the main political parties in the polling average since last parliamentary election. The graph shows the average vote share of each party, excluding undecided voters.

== Poll results ==
Poll results are listed in the table in reverse chronological order, showing the most recent first. The highest figure in each survey is displayed in bold, and the background shaded in the leading party's colour. In the case of a tie, no figure is shaded. When available, seat projections for 88 out of 90 seats (without seats reserved for minorities) are displayed below the percentages in a smaller font. 46 seats are required for an absolute majority in the National Assembly. The dates of when the poll was conducted are given when available, otherwise, the date of publication is listed.

Political parties or lists must surpass the national 4% electoral threshold to qualify for seat allocation.

=== 2026 ===
Date(s) conducted	Pollster	Client	Sample size	GS	SDS	SA	SD	DEM	L	RES	PVP	PIR	SNS	MI!	Others	Lead
19 Nov	Katja Kokot and Aleksander Štorek leave Resni.ca, continuing as independent MPs.															
16–19 Nov	Mediana	POP	721	25.6	**28.7**	9.4	10.4	4.3	10.5	2.5	2.1	2.1	2.9	—	1.4	3.1
15 Nov	First round of local elections are held.															
5–8 Nov	Mediana	Delo	716	23.4	**28.7**	12.1	9.3	4.8	8.5	2.3	3.6	3.3	1.8	—	2.0	2.4
19–22 Oct	Mediana	POP	717	24.1	**27.0**	9.8	10.3	4.6	8.1	4.2	2.1	1.2 (Note: The poll grouped the party with others and reported only a rounded percentage.)	1.2	—	1.2	2.9
1–16 Oct	IJEK	N/A	608	21.8	**27.2**	11.3	11.7	4.8	9.8	5.0	1.9	4.0	1.9	—	0.9	5.4
12–14 Oct	Ninamedia	Dnevnik	700	23.0	**28.5**	10.7 (Note: Polled separate. 8.9 - N.Si 1.1 - SLS 0.7 - Focus of Marko Lotrič)	11.5	3.9	11.1	1.5	2.5	2.0	1.8	1.5	2.2 (Note: 0.7 - Party of Generations 0.4 - Vesna – Green Party 0.2 - Greens of Slovenia 0.2 - For a Healthy Society 0.2 - None of This)	5.0
5–8 Oct	Mediana	Delo	736	24.6	**27.0**	10.4	11.6	2.6	8.2	4.4	2.2	3.6	3.4	—	2.0	2.4
24 Sep	Karl Erjavec - Trust Party dissolves, its local branch continues in Kranj, under a different name.															
21–24 Sep	Mediana	POP	716	26.1	**30.4**	9.0	8.7	5.4	7.8	3.7	1.4	3.6	1.9	—	2.2	4.3
1–18 Sep	IJEK	N/A	643	23.9	**27.9**	8.8	9.5	4.7	8.7	3.9	3.6	3.4	3.0	—	2.4	4.0
14–16 Sep	Ninamedia	Dnevnik	700	24.8	**28.6**	10.0 (Note: Polled separate. 8.6 - N.Si 0.9 - SLS 0.5 - Focus of Marko Lotrič)	10.2	4.2	9.1	2.5	3.4	1.8	1.4	1.1	2.8 (Note: 0.7 - Vesna – Green Party 0.5 - Greens of Slovenia 0.5 - Party of Generations 0.4 - For a Healthy Society 0.2 - None of This)	3.8
7–10 Sep	Mediana	Delo	717	24.1	**29.1**	9.9	9.7	4.4	6.2	3.8	4.0	3.7	1.7	—	3.5	5.0
17–20 Aug	Mediana	POP	719	26.3	**27.3**	10.4	8.5	3.5	6.1	5.0	2.5	4.3	2.5	—	1.3	1.0
10–12 Aug	Ninamedia	Dnevnik	700	26.5	**26.9**	9.3 (Note: Polled separate. 7.6 - N.Si 1.0 - SLS 0.7 - Focus of Marko Lotrič)	10.2	4.4	8.7	3.2	2.7	2.5	1.9	1.4	2.7 (Note: 1.0 - Vesna – Green Party 0.7 - Greens of Slovenia 0.5 - Party of Generations 0.3 - For a Healthy Society 0.2 - None of This)	0.4
3–6 Aug	Mediana	Delo	720	25.8	**29.6**	9.7	6.9	5.3	7.3	3.1	2.4	4.5	2.3	—	3.2	3.8
23 July	Levica and Vesna ceases to exist.															
20–23 Jul	Mediana	POP	719	24.8	**27.8**	10.5	8.4	5.8	8.5 (Note: Polled as Levica and Vesna.)	4.2	2.4	2.4	2.5	—	1.2	3.0
13–15 Jul	Ninamedia	Dnevnik	700	25.6	**27.3**	8.6 (Note: Polled as N.Si not the SA alliance.)	10.2	4.2	9.7	3.2	—	—	—	—	14.5	1.7
6–9 Jul	Mediana	Delo	725	25.9	**28.3**	10.7	7.5	4.7	9.9	4.3	2.9	2.4	1.8	—	1.5	2.4
22–24 Jun	Mediana	POP	721	27.5	**28.4**	10.3	9.9	3.5	8.3	3.9	2.5	3.1	1.9	—	0.5	0.9
8–19 Jun	IJEK	N/A	543	24.4	**26.3**	11.0	9.0	4.6	9.7	6.4	2.9	2.4	1.9	—	1.4	1.9
11 June	Vlado Dimovski resigns as a leader of the Party of Generations, Darinka Mravljak becomes interim leader.															
8–11 Jun	Mediana	Delo	719	26.7	**26.8**	11.1	10.2	5.1	9.1	3.8	1.7	3.0	—	—	2.4	0.1
8–10 Jun	Ninamedia	Dnevnik	700	26.6	**28.3**	9.5 (Note: Polled separate. 8.8 - N.Si 0.4 - SLS 0.3 - Focus of Marko Lotrič)	9.1	4.3	8.3	3.9	3.2	1.8	1.9	1.2	1.9 (Note: 0.4 - Vesna – Green Party)	1.7
4 June	16th Government of Slovenia is confirmed.															
22 May	Janez Janša is elected as prime minister.															
18–21 May	Mediana	POP	719	26.6	**29.2**	8.7	8.0	4.6	6.8	3.7	3.9	2.8	3.4	—	2.3	2.6
4–20 May	IJEK	N/A	611	24.4	**27.1**	10.8	10.2	4.5	7.8	4.6	3.5	2.3	3.5	—	1.3	2.7
11–13 May	Ninamedia	Dnevnik	700	**28.9**	25.0	11.5 (Note: Combined result of N.Si and SLS)	9.3	3.2	9.7	4.3	2.1	1.6	1.3	0.7	2.1 (Note: 0.4 - Vesna – Green Party)	3.9
8–12 May	Valicon	Siol	1,527	**25.4**	25.0	8.9	7.8	4.7	6.1	7.5	3.2	4.8	2.8	1.3	2.8 (Note: 0.9 - Alternative for Slovenia 0.9 - Voice of Pensioners (polled, despite dissolving))	0.4
5–7 May	Mediana	Delo	718	**29.7**	28.7	10.8	5.7	5.5	6.4	4.0	2.3	3.3	1.3	—	2.3	1.0
21–23 Apr	Mediana	POP	722	28.0	**29.2**	10.4	7.1	4.9	6.9	4.6	3.4	1.4	2.9	—	1.4	1.2
13–15 Apr	Ninamedia	Dnevnik	700	**29.3**	27.9	8.7 (Note: Polled as New Slovenia not as the NSi, SLS, FOKUS alliance)	7.3	5.2	5.8	4.4	3.1	2.0	2.8	—	3.5	1.4
1–10 Apr	IJEK	N/A	675	26.4	**28.1**	10.9	7.5	6.2	7.7	5.4	2.6	1.4	1.8	0.6	1.6 (Note: 0.6 - Greens of Slovenia and Party of Generations 0.6 - Alternative for Slovenia)	1.7
10 Apr	Zoran Stevanović is elected as speaker of the National Assembly															
7–9 Apr	Mediana	Delo	700	**27.6**	27.0	10.6	6.4	6.8	6.4	5.6	1.8	2.9	3.5	—	1.4	0.6
23 Mar	Pavel Rupar abandons Voice of Pensioners, the party dissolves, but is not deleted from the party register.															
22 Mar	Election results		1,179,769	28.7	27.9	9.3	6.7	6.7	5.7 (Note: As part of Levica and Vesna)	5.5	3.1	2.4	2.2	0.5	1.6 (Note: 0.5 - Greens of Slovenia and Party of Generations 0.4 - Alternative for Slovenia 0.4 - Voice of Pensioners 0.3 - Karl Erjavec - Trust Party 0.0 - Unity 0.0 - Solution - Party of Pensioners Velenje, Slovenia)	0.8

Notes;

== Seat projection ==
46 seats needed for a majority.

=== MRP polls ===
Month published	Pollster	Client	GS	SDS	SA	SD	DEM	LV	RES	Others (Note: 2 seats are reserved for MPs of the Italian and Hungarian minorities.)
Jul 2026	Ninamedia	Dnevnik	26	28	9	11	4	10	0	2
Jun 2026	Odmev	N/A	27	28	10	10	4	9	0	2
May 2026	Odmev	N/A	27	27	10	8	4	7	5	2
May 2026	IJEK	N/A	25	27	11	10	4	7	4	2
May 2026	Odmev	N/A	31	30	11	5	5	6	0	2
Apr 2026	Odmev	N/A	27	27	10	7	5	6	5	2
Apr 2026	Ninamedia	Dnevnik	29	28	9	7	5	6	4	2
Apr 2026	IJEK	N/A	27	27	10	7	6	6	5	2
Apr 2026	Odmev	N/A	26	27	10	7	6	7	5	2
Mar 2026	2026 Election		29	28	9	6	6	5	5	2

== Leadership polls ==
=== Leaders' ratings ===
Poll results showing the public opinion on all political party leaders rated from 1 to 5. The results are shown in the table below in reverse chronological order (showing the most recent first).

Polling firm/Link	Fieldwork date	Nataša Pirc Musar	Matjaž Han	Franci Matoz	Andrej Šircelj	Marko Lotrič	Jernej Vrtovec	Janez Cigler Kralj	Meira Hot	Janez Janša	Tadej Ostrc	Lead
Mediana	5–8 Oct 2026	3.1	3.1	2.7	2.7	2.7	2.7	2.6	2.5	2.5	2.5	0.03

=== Cabinet approval/disapproval ratings ===
Poll results showing public opinion on the performance of the Government are shown in the table below in reverse chronological order, showing the most recent first.

Polling firm/Link	Fieldwork date	Sample size	Janez Janša's cabinet			
Polling firm/Link	Fieldwork date	Sample size	Approve	Disapprove	Undecided	Net
Mediana	20–23 Jul 2026	719	36.8	46.6	16.6	9.8
Ninamedia	13–15 Jul 2026	700	33.7	49.6	16.7	15.9
Mediana	21–24 Jun 2026	721	38	44	17	6.0
