= Candidates in the 2026 Slovenian parliamentary election =

Parliamentary candidates were selected for the 2026 parliamentary election.

At the deadline on 19 February 2026, a total of 11 MPs announced they were standing down at the election. This included a record number of Freedom Movement MPs. As of now 25 former Members of Parliament intend to stand in the election, this includes 10 current ministers and secretaries, some of which were elected to the current parliament, but were replaced after they took on their respective positions. And the PM Robert Golob, who was replaced by Bojan Čebela, after he took on the job as prime minister.

A total of 1,342 candidates were put forward.

== Parties ==
Parties	Number of candidates
Resni.ca	88
Democrats	88
Slovenian Democratic Party	87
Prerod - Party of Vladimir Prebilič	84
Freedom Movement	83
Social Democrats	83
The Left and Vesna	83
Pavel Rupar's Voice of Pensioners	82
We, Socialists!	72
Karl Erjavec - Trust Party	70 (Note: Karl Erjavec - Trust Party are running on the list together with Suvereni)
Slovenian National Party	66
Alternative for Slovenia	55
New Slovenia	49 (Note: New Slovenia, Slovenian People's Party and Focus of Marko Lotrič formed a three way coalition)
Pirate Party of Slovenia	48
Party of Generations	46 (Note: Greens of Slovenia and Party of Generations formed a coalition)
Greens of Slovenia	38 (Note: Greens of Slovenia and Party of Generations formed a coalition)
Slovenian People's Party	24 (Note: New Slovenia, Slovenian People's Party and Focus of Marko Lotrič formed a three way coalition)
Focus of Marko Lotrič	15 (Note: New Slovenia, Slovenian People's Party and Focus of Marko Lotrič formed a three way coalition)
Unity	11
Solution - Party of Pensioners	8
Suvereni	6 (Note: Suvereni are running on the list of Karl Erjavec - Trust Party)
NSi, SLS, FOKUS	1 (Note: Stojan Auer is candidate of all three parties)

== Candidate changes ==
=== MPs not standing for re-election ===
Name	Constituency	Party	Reason	Member since	Ref.
Predrag Baković	Kočevje	SD	Retiring	2018	
Mirjam Bon Klajnšček	Ljubljana Bežigrad II	GS	Unknown	2013	
Bojan Čebela	Vrhnika	GS	Unknown	2022	
Vera Granfol	Gornja Radgona	GS	Unknown	2022	
Andreja Kert	Kranj I	GS	Unknown	2022	
Aleš Lipičnik	Kamnik	GS	Unknown	2024	
Franc Rosec	Velenje II	SDS	Career opportunities	2018	
Gašper Ovnik	Hrastnik - Trbovlje	GS	Unknown	2022	
Mojca Stegovec	Ajdovščina	GS	Unknown	2026	
Ratislav Vrečko	Maribor VI	GS	Unknown	2022	
Jože Tanko	Ribnica - Dobrepolje	SDS	Retiring	2000	

== Election polling ==
- Opinion polling for the 2026 Slovenian parliamentary election
