= Elections in Slovenia =

Slovenian Electoral Constituencies

At a national level, Slovenia elects a head of state (a president) and a legislature. The president is elected for a five-year term by the people using the run-off system. The National Assembly (Državni zbor), Slovenia's parliament, has 90 members each elected for four-year terms. All but two of these are elected using the D'Hondt method of list proportional representation. The remaining two members are elected by the Italian and Hungarian ethnic minorities using the Borda count.

Slovenia's multi-party system means that any one party is unlikely to gain power alone. Coalition governments must therefore be negotiated and formed.

At an international level, Slovenia elects 9 members of the European Parliament. The MEPs term is five years.

In addition to the elections mentioned above, Slovenia organizes the local elections. Mayors of all 212 municipalities and members of municipal councils are elected. Local elections are held once every four years and have two rounds of voting.

== Latest elections ==
=== 2022 presidential election ===
In the first round Anže Logar received 34% of the voter share against 27% for Nataša Pirc Musar. Milan Brglez was third with around 15%. For the second round Golob then turned his support to Pirc Musar.

In the run-off, independent Pirc Musar was expected to win since August 2022. Logar also ran as an independent, but was a member of the Slovenian Democratic Party (SDS), which lost parliamentary elections six months prior. Logar was therefore associated with Janša, who was accused with attempting to restrict the freedom of expression and undermine the independence of the judiciary during his term in office.

In the evening of 13 November 2022, the electoral commission reported that Pirc Musar won with nearly 54% of the vote, after which Logar conceded defeat and congratulated Pirc Musar on her victory. Pirc Musar will become Slovenia's first female president, commander-in-chief of the Slovenian Army and also be responsible for appointing the head of the Central Bank of Slovenia.

Candidate	Party	First round		Second round	
Candidate	Party	Votes	%	Votes	%
Anže Logar	Independent (Note: Endorsed by the SDS and the SLS.)	296,000	33.95	414,029	46.11
Nataša Pirc Musar	Independent (Note: Endorsed by the Pirati and the SMS-Z.)	234,361	26.88	483,812	53.89
Milan Brglez	Social Democrats	134,726	15.45		
Vladimir Prebilič	Independent	92,456	10.60		
Sabina Senčar	Resni.ca	51,767	5.94		
Janez Cigler Kralj	New Slovenia	38,113	4.37		
Miha Kordiš	The Left	24,518	2.81		
Total		871,941	100.00	897,841	100.00
Valid votes		871,941	99.47	897,841	98.87
Invalid/blank votes		4,625	0.53	10,224	1.13
Total votes		876,566	100.00	908,065	100.00
Registered voters/turnout		1,694,437	51.73	1,694,373	53.59
Source: Volitve

=== 2024 European Parliament election ===
Party	Votes	%	Seats	+/–
Slovenian Democratic Party	206,368	30.61	4	+2
Freedom Movement	149,200	22.13	2	New
Vesna – Green Party	71,023	10.54	1	New
Social Democrats	52,390	7.77	1	–1
New Slovenia – Christian Democrats	51,182	7.59	1	0
Slovenian People's Party	48,637	7.21	0	–1
The Left	32,436	4.81	0	0
Resni.ca	26,767	3.97	0	New
Democratic Party of Pensioners − Good State	14,980	2.22	0	0
Greens of Slovenia	10,865	1.61	0	0
None of the Above	10,263	1.52	0	New
Total	674,111	100.00	9	+1
Valid votes	674,111	95.58		
Invalid/blank votes	31,182	4.42		
Total votes	705,293	100.00		
Registered voters/turnout	1,689,586	41.74		

=== 2026 parliamentary election ===
The election resulted in a hung parliament, with no major party being likely to secure a majority of 46 seats. Freedom Movement (GS) received 28.63% of the vote, while the opposition Slovenian Democratic Party (SDS) received 27.95% of the vote, creating a gap of 0.68 percentage points, the smallest margin ever between the top two parties in a Slovenian parliamentary election. With GS and SDS winning 29 and 28 seats respectively, the left-leaning bloc led by Golob decreased to 40 MPs and the right-leaning bloc led by Janša increased to 43 MPs.

In third place was the right-wing coalition of New Slovenia, Slovenian People's Party and Focus taking 9.29% of the vote and winning a total of nine seats (NSi won 7 seats, SLS won 1 seat and Focus won 1 seat). The Social Democrats and Democrats each took around 6.70% of the vote, giving both parties their respective six seats. Left–Vesna took five seats (The Left won all 5 seats) with 5.58% of the vote, while Resni.ca also took five seats with 5.52% of the vote. Zoran Stevanović, leader of Resni.ca, stated that the party was not interested in joining the right-leaning bloc led by Janša.

Party	Votes	%	Seats	+/–
Freedom Movement	338,102	28.66	29	–12
Slovenian Democratic Party	328,923	27.88	28	+1
NSi, SLS, FOKUS	109,201	9.26	9	+1
Social Democrats	79,175	6.71	6	–1
Democrats	78,902	6.69	6	New
Levica and Vesna	67,183	5.69	5	0
Resni.ca	64,799	5.49	5	+5
Prerod – Party of Vladimir Prebilič	35,976	3.05	0	New
Pirate Party	27,811	2.36	0	0
Slovenian National Party	26,375	2.24	0	0
We, Socialists!	5,657	0.48	0	New
Greens of Slovenia and Party of Generations	5,277	0.45	0	0
Alternative for Slovenia	4,785	0.41	0	0
Voice of Pensioners	4,193	0.36	0	New
Karl Erjavec – Trust Party	2,995	0.25	0	New
Unity	251	0.02	0	0
Solution – Party of Pensioners Velenje	164	0.01	0	New
Italian and Hungarian national minorities			2	0
Total	1,179,769	100.00	90	0
Valid votes	1,179,769	99.07		
Invalid/blank votes	11,050	0.93		
Total votes	1,190,819	100.00		
Registered voters/turnout	1,695,220	70.25		
Source: dvk-rs.si

=== Constituency results ===
The SDS prevailed in five constituencies out of eight, winning in Celje, as well as Kranj, Novo Mesto and Ptuj, where they secured their best result at 32.67% of the vote. The party also secured Maribor, Slovenia's second-largest city, with 30.75% of the vote. Conversely, the GS won the capital districts of Ljubljana Bežigrad and Ljubljana Center, as well as Postojna, where they recorded their best result at 34.79% of the vote. The GS's performance represented a decline from their 2022 result, when they won all eight constituencies; however, they still secured a plurality of seats in three electoral districts: Ljubljana Center, Ljubljana Bežigrad and Novo Mesto. Conversely, the SDS won their pluralities in Ptuj and Celje, while the two parties won an even amount of delegates in Postojna, Maribor and Kranj.

Constituency	GS		SDS		NSi, SLS and FOKUS		SD		Democrats		Levica and Vesna		Resni.ca		Others	
Constituency	Votes	%	Votes	%	Votes	%	Votes	%	Votes	%	Votes	%	Votes	%	Votes	%
Celje	39,450	26.36	46,705	31.60	15,508	10.39	11,373	7.62	10,166	6.81	6,128	4.11	7,676	5.14	12,328	8.26
Kranj	39,132	26.10	41,554	27.71	16,765	11.18	8,028	5.35	9,950	6.64	8,797	5.87	10,554	7.04	15,164	10.10
Ljubljana Bežigrad	43,082	29.18	38,279	25.93	12,768	8.65	8,662	5.87	9,936	6.73	10,287	6.97	7,792	5.28	16,834	11.41
Ljubljana Center	46,234	29.12	37,529	23.64	13,883	8.74	9,859	6.21	11,596	7.30	15,126	9.53	7,392	4.66	17,162	10.80
Maribor	39,037	28.33	42,471	30.83	9,782	7.10	9,375	6.80	9,686	7.03	6,406	4.65	8,092	5.87	12,926	9.38
Novo Mesto	41,423	27.74	43,928	29.42	15,330	10.27	12,171	8.15	9,160	6.13	5,905	3.95	7,100	4.75	14,303	9.57
Postojna	47,962	34.74	31,136	22.55	12,610	9.13	10,199	7.39	7,791	5.64	8,239	5.97	6,793	4.92	13,319	9.65
Ptuj	37,763	27.80	44,434	32.71	11,740	8.64	8,636	6.36	9,748	7.18	4,199	3.09	8,973	6.61	10,334	7.61
Total	333,973	28.63	326,036	27.95	108,386	9.29	78,303	6.71	78,033	6.69	65,087	5.58	64,372	5.52	110,204	9.44
Source: DVK

Maps
The GS's performance by constituency

The SDS's performance by constituency

The NSI-SLS-Fokus's performance by constituency

=== Turnout ===
==== Early voting ====
Day	Voters	%	Ref
Tuesday, 17 March	24,559	1.4	
Wednesday, 18 March	29,652	1.7	
Thursday, 19 March	27,494	1.6	
Total	81.705	4.8	

==== Election day ====
Time	Voters	%	Ref
Until 11am (Note: Does not include early voting.)	362.383	21.38	
Until 4pm (Note: Does not include early voting.)	859.909	50.73	
Until 4pm (Note: Also includes early voting.)	941.614	55.53	
Total turnout	1.190.819	70.25	

==== Turnout by electoral districts ====
Electoral district	Eligible voters	Turnout	2026 turnout	2022 turnout	Change
Kranj	208,965	150,564	72.05 %	74.14 %	▼2.09 %
Postojna	209,323	137,970	65.91 %	69.56 %	▼3.65 %
Ljubljana – Center	221,718	158,219	71.36 %	75.26 %	▼3.90 %
Ljubljana – Bežigrad	210,021	143,482	68.32 %	73.63 %	▼4.31 %
Celje	210,609	149,449	70.96 %	71.61 %	▼0.65 %
Novo Mesto	217,947	149,244	68.48 %	70.36 %	▼1.88 %
Maribor	206,707	138,193	66.85 %	67.94 %	▼1.09 %
Ptuj	209,914	136,010	64.79 %	65.13 %	▼0.34 %

Following the election, prime minister Robert Golob said that he would try to create a government of national unity and invited all parties, except SDS, for coalition talks. This offer was rejected by NSi and its partners, the Slovenian People's Party and Focus of Marko Lotrič. Leaders of the Democrats and Resni.ca stated that they do not want to be in a government together with The Left.

On 1 April, the leaders of Democrats, Resni.ca and NSi announced that their intention to form a centre-right coalition or a "third bloc" in anticipation of imminent post-election coalition talks. This third bloc would hold 20 seats in the National Assembly and would further complicate the path to a government formation. The leader of Resni.ca, Zoran Stevanović, stated that his party would not support any government led by Janez Janša or Robert Golob, stating his preference for a repeat snap election. Despite this, Golob called for the will of the voters to be respected and expressed enthusiasm that the next government would be led by his party. Anže Logar, the leader of the Democrats called for Golob to announce a ministry allocation proposal.

On 7 April, Golob announced allocations of ministries in the proposed national unity government: seven for Freedom Movement, three for NSi-led coalition and two for SD, Democrats and The Left each. He also expected external cooperation with Resni.ca on some topics. The offer was rejected by NSi-led coalition. Golob also proposed individual coalition talks with these parties.

On 10 April, Resni.ca leader Zoran Stevanović was elected speaker of the National Assembly after being nominated by Resni.ca, SDS and NSi MPs. GS announced that they voted against him, while The Left and SD abstained.

Candidate	Votes	Yes	No	Invalid
Zoran Stevanović	79	48	29	2

On 12 April, newsletter Dnevnik reported that at least two MPs from the Democrats had worries about possible Janša-led government. Leader of the Democrats, Anže Logar, later stated that his party is unified and that the GS is still the only party that invited them for coalition talks.

On 17 April, Anže Logar officially stated that his party is leaving coalition talks with GS, because GS attempted to negotiate with individual MPs to cross the floor. Robert Golob responded by accusing Logar and Stevanović of cheating their own voters by giving fake pre-election promises of not entering a government led by Janša and by only pretending to have real interest in forming a possible second government led by GS. Furthermore, Golob released documents from coalition negotiations, where GS promised to fulfill all main points of the pre-election programme of the Democrats.

On 20 April, Golob admitted that he could not form a government and said that his party would go into opposition.

On 21 April, Freedom Movement announced that they were filing a constitutional complaint regarding the election of the speaker, asserting that a number of ballots used in the speakership election were visibly marked, which would allegedly be a violation of national deputies’ right to the fairness of a secret vote in the speakership election.

On 25 April, president Nataša Pirc Musar stated after finishing personal consultations with all leaders of elected parties that she would not nominate someone for prime minister, because no one reached the required minimum of 46 votes. She also said that these personal consultations had no trust, respect or honesty and that she sees a lot of changes in positions and behavior of parties after the election.

On 6 May, a new round of coalition talks were initiated by Janša, who seeks to form a coalition with NSi-SLS-FOKUS, the Democrats and Resni.ca. Although Speaker Stevanović reaffirmed that his party wouldn't join a coalition, he stated that it would "support a candidate with widespread support". However, SDS later said it did not intend to continue negotiations. If no agreement is reached on a new prime ministerial candidate, fresh elections will be held.

On 16 May, Stevanović publicly announced that Resni.ca will externally support Janez Janša for prime minister, making his fourth government possible.

On 19 May, 48 MPs endorsed Janez Janša for Prime Minister. On the same day, an MP from Resni.ca, Katja Kokot, accused left-leaning MPs of attempting to bribe MPs from Resni.ca with seven figures bribes, in order to thwart the creation of the fourth Janša government. However she did not name any concrete names or support any evidence to her claims.

On 22 May, Janša was sworn in as Prime Minister. He received 51 votes in a secret ballot in the parliament, which came as surprise, because at least 1 opposition MP must have voted for Janša.

== See also ==
- Electoral calendar
- Electoral system
