= Let's Connect Slovenia =

Let's Connect Slovenia Povežimo Slovenijo
- Founded: September 2020 (announced); 26 January 2021 (formed)
- Ideology: Big tent
- Political position: Centre to centre-right
- National Assembly: 0 / 90
- European Parliament: 1 / 8

Website
- povezimoslovenijo.si

Let's Connect Slovenia (Slovene: Povežimo Slovenijo, PoS) was a political alliance in Slovenia. It ran for the 2022 parliamentary election but did not win any seats.

== Composition ==
Name	Main Ideology	Position	Leader	MPs	MEPs
Concretely	Liberalism	Centre	Zdravko Počivalšek	0 / 90	0 / 9
Slovenian People's Party	Conservatism	Centre-right	Marjan Podobnik	0 / 90	0 / 9
Greens of Slovenia	Green conservatism	Centre-right	Andrej Čuš	0 / 90	0 / 9
New People's Party of Slovenia	Conservatism	Centre-right	Željko Vogrin	0 / 90	0 / 9
New Social Democracy	Social democracy, Christian socialism	Centre-left	Andrej Magajna	0 / 90	0 / 9
Mayor List of Celje	Regionalism	Centre-right	Bojan Šrot	0 / 90	0 / 9

== Results ==
=== National Assembly ===
Election	Leader	Votes	%	Seats	+/–	Government
2022	Zdravko Počivalšek	40,612	3.41 (#7)	0 / 90	New	Extra-parliamentary
