= None of This =

None of This Nič od tega
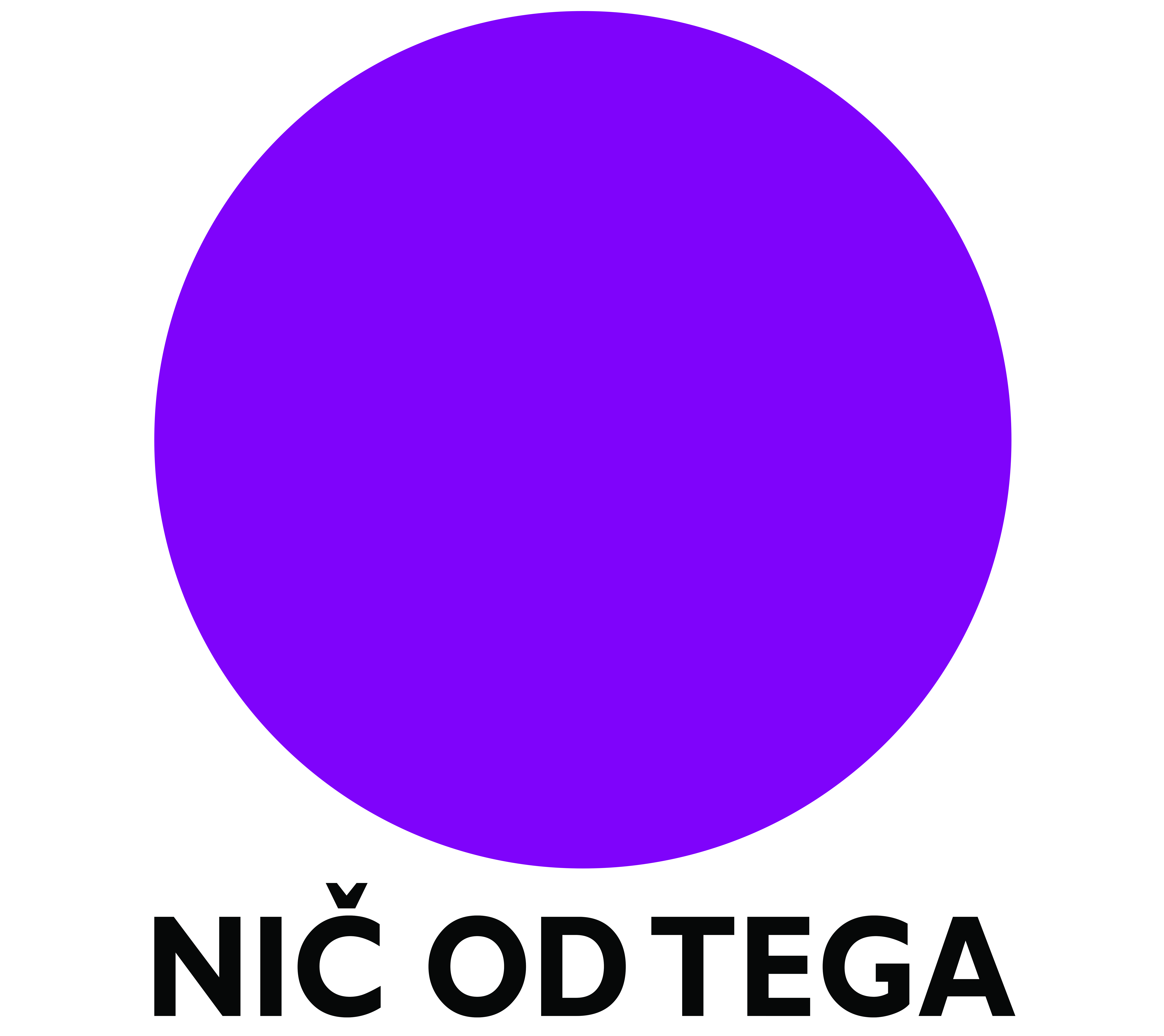
- President: Violeta Tomić; Boris Žulj
- Founded: 2024
- Headquarters: Komenskega 14; 1000 Ljubljana
- Ideology: Political satire Hard Russophilia; Euroscepticism
- Colours: Purple
- National Assembly: 0 / 90
- European Parliament: 0 / 9
- Mayors: 0 / 212
- Municipal councillors: 0 / 2,750

Website
- strankanot.si

None of This (Slovene: Nič od tega, abbreviated NOT) is a Slovenian political party, established at the beginning of 2024 after, according to leading members, more than a year of preparations. The party was officially presented to the public on 22 March 2024 in Ljubljana in a rather unusual way, with satirical slogans. The leaders of the party are activist Boris Žulj and former The Left MP Violeta Tomić.

== History ==
=== Beginnings ===
Originally it was a satirical party, describing itself as the "founder of nothingism and a party adapted to everyone." At the official press conference, representatives in their own style promised the legalization of corruption, victory at Eurovision, free spas and endless happiness. On social media, they published satirical positions such as the legalization of corruption, abolition of Mondays, renaming courts into farces, and so on. A three-member triumvirate was chosen to lead the party. They emphasized their desire to have an MEP, and therefore they also ran in the 2024 European Parliament election in Slovenia, with Violeta Tomić as the top candidate.

In debates, the leader advocated free movement of people within the EU, human rights, nuclear energy as "green" energy, opposition to defence investments, and the idea that the main polluters are "corporations and the military industry." Tomić, who regularly attends pro-Russian rallies, also claimed that a "proxy war" between the USA and Russia has been taking place on Ukrainian territory since 2014, and not only since the Russian invasion in 2022, blaming Ukraine for Russian aggression. She argued that the war in Ukraine should be "stopped," humanitarian aid sent there, and the war resolved "diplomatically at peace negotiations," citing the Pope's statement that it is time for Ukraine to surrender. During the campaign, she also claimed that "Russia has never been defeated in history" and spread Russian disinformation about an alleged "genocide in Donbas."

=== Departure of the ideological leader ===
Soon after the European elections, internal conflicts emerged. On 4 July 2024, Rok Gros, the party's ideological leader and one of the three members of the triumvirate, left the party due to disagreements. In a social media post, he wrote that Violeta Tomić and Boris Žulj "grossly betrayed his trust" and that "such people should never be near decisions about important matters, let alone lead the country." At the same time, the party's website was shut down, and a new official Facebook profile was created. According to Janez Stariha, a candidate on the European list, the triumvirate was also abolished through a statute change.

=== Pre-election cooperation ===
On 21 August 2025, it was announced in a joint press release that NOT would run in the 2026 Slovenian parliamentary election in cooperation with the party For a Healthy Society. Neither parties won any seats.

== European elections ==
=== 2024 European Parliament elections ===
The party ran independently in the 2024 European Parliament election in Slovenia, with Violeta Tomić as the lead candidate. Among others, the party was publicly endorsed by former Greek finance minister Yanis Varoufakis.

The list was submitted on the last day for candidate submissions, Friday, 10 May. The party emphasized that it sought success through a satirical campaign and by holding up a mirror to politicians.

1. Violeta Tomić
2. Darko Hribar
3. Tjaša Zorc Rupnik
4. Janez Stariha
5. Alenka Pečnik
6. Gregor Jankovič
7. Amadeja Kugl
8. Tomaž Makovec
9. Alberto Avguštinčič

In the election, the party won 1.53% of the vote, finishing last and failing to enter the European Parliament. The result was described as "good," and the party announced its intention to run in the next parliamentary elections.

== Election results ==
=== National Assembly ===
Election	Leader	Votes	%	Seats	+/–	Government
2026 (Note: Run as part of Alternative for Slovenia.)	Violeta Tomić; Boris Žulj	4,785	0.41 (#13)	0 / 90	New	Extra-parliamentary
