= Concretely =

Social-liberal political party in Slovenia

Concretely Konkretno
- President: Janez Dular
- Founder: Zdravko Počivalšek; Alojz Kovšca
- Founded: 4 December 2021
- Dissolved: June 2025
- Merger of: SMC; GAS
- Merged into: Democrats
- Headquarters: Ljubljana
- Ideology: Liberalism; Conservative liberalism Pro-Europeanism
- Political position: Centre
- National affiliation: Let's Connect Slovenia
- Regional affiliation: Liberal South East European Network (LIBSEEN)
- International affiliation: Liberal International

Website
- konkretno.si

Concretely (Slovene: Konkretno) was a liberal political party in Slovenia last led by Janez Dular. Founding congress took place on 4 December 2021 in Celje. Concretely was a result of a merger between the Modern Centre Party (SMC) and Economic Activity Party (GAS). It was a member of Let's Connect Slovenia alliance. In 2025 the party merged into the Democrats.

== History ==
At Počivalšek's takeover on the lead of the political party in 2019 he announced consolidation of SMC party. On SMC congress on 16 September Počivalšek announced a fusion with GAS, which was led by the president of the National Council of Slovenia, Alojz Kovšca. Delegates of both parties supported the merger, they also announced a merger with a few smaller local parties. GAS made a decision about consolidation in November 2021.

On 4 December 2021, SMC merged with the extra-parliamentary Economic Activity Party. With this, SMC's membership in Alliance of Liberals and Democrats for Europe Party (ALDE) was automatically terminated. After the process, newly formed Concretely kept its five members of the Parliament. Later in December 2021, MP Mateja Udovč left the party, leaving Concretely with four members of the parliament (the number which it kept until the 8th term of Slovene National Assembly concluded in 2022).

== Results ==
=== National Assembly ===
Election	Leader	Votes	%	Seats	+/–	Government
2022 (Note: Run within Let's Connect Slovenia coalition.)	Zdravko Počivalšek	40,612	3.41 (#7)	0 / 90	New	Extra-parliamentary
