= Dnevnik (Slovenia) =

Newspaper in Slovenia

- Type: Daily newspaper
- Format: Berliner
- Owner(s): DZS, d.d.
- Publisher: Dnevnik, d.d.
- Editor: Zlatko Šetinc (acting)
- Founded: 1951
- Political alignment: Left-wing
- Headquarters: Ljubljana, Slovenia
- Website: www.dnevnik.si

Dnevnik (English: The Daily) is a daily newspaper published in Ljubljana, Slovenia.

== History and profile ==
Dnevnik was first issued in June 1951 as Ljubljanski dnevnik but was renamed to Dnevnik in 1968. The paper is based in Ljubljana.

The circulation of Dnevnik was 66,000 copies in 2003. Its 2007 circulation was 58,300 copies, making it the third most read daily in the country. During the period of July–September 2011 it had a circulation of 37,194 copies. According to a periodic poll on printed media, conducted by marketing research company Valicon, Dnevnik had a reach of 147,000 from second half of 2011 and first half of 2012.
