= For a Healthy Society =

For a Healthy Society Za zdravo družbo
- Leader: Jure Pogačnik
- Founded: 28 March 2018
- Headquarters: Spodnji Rudnik II 33; 1000 Ljubljana
- Ideology: Vaccine hesitancy Anti-5G; Antiglobalism; Anti-immigration
- Colours: Orange, White
- National Assembly: 0 / 90
- European Parliament: 0 / 9

Website
- zazdravodruzbo.si

Za zdravo družbo (English: For a Healthy Society) is a Slovenian political party established on 26 March 2018.

The civil-society, non-party movement Gibanje Zdrava družba (English: Healthy Society Movement) participated in the 2022 parliamentary elections under the name Non-party People's List of the Healthy Society Movement.

== National Assembly elections ==
=== 2018 parliamentary election ===
The party participated in the election and received 0.62% of the vote.

=== 2022 parliamentary election ===
In the 2022 election, the party's successor, the civil-society movement Healthy Society, ran under the name Non-party People's List of the Healthy Society Movement. They received 21,021 votes, or 1.76%. For the first time in Slovenia’s history, a non-party movement successfully ran for elections using a non-party list procedure by collecting 8,000 voter signatures – at least 1,000 in each electoral district. They submitted 13,500 signatures in total.

=== 2026 parliamentary election ===
In the 2026 election, it was a part of the Alternative for Slovenia alliance along with None of This. The alliance received 4,785 votes (0.41%) and no seats.

== Presidential election ==
=== 2022 presidential election ===
The Healthy Society Movement intended to nominate Boris Vene, an author and personal development expert, as their presidential candidate. However, he did not file his candidacy due to an insufficient number of collected signatures.

== Policy positions ==
According to its own statements, the party opposes "the Davos agenda (WEF), the World Health Organization (WHO) and the global centers of power. We reject the ideas of global depopulation and deindustrialization of Europe, we reject the ideas of a new world order and digital totalitarianism." The party has promoted George Soros conspiracy theories.

Their main policy positions included:

- Preservation of Slovenian cultural heritage,
- Elimination of systemic corruption,
- Promotion of individual health through vegetarian and vegan organic food from local self-sufficiency without harmful pesticides,
- Increased civic participation,
- Individual choice in medical procedures (including the abolition of mandatory vaccination).

== Election results ==
=== National Assembly ===
Election	Leader	Votes	%	Seats	+/–	Government
2018	Jure Pogačnik	5,548	0.62 (#15)	0 / 90	New	Extra-parliamentary
2022 (Note: As the Non-party People's List of the Healthy Society Movement)	Jure Pogačnik	21,021	1.76 (#10)	0 / 90	0	Extra-parliamentary
2026 (Note: Run as part of Alternative for Slovenia.)	Jure Pogačnik	4,785	0.41 (#13)	0 / 90	0	Extra-parliamentary
