= Alternative for Slovenia =

Alternative for Slovenia Alternativa za Slovenijo
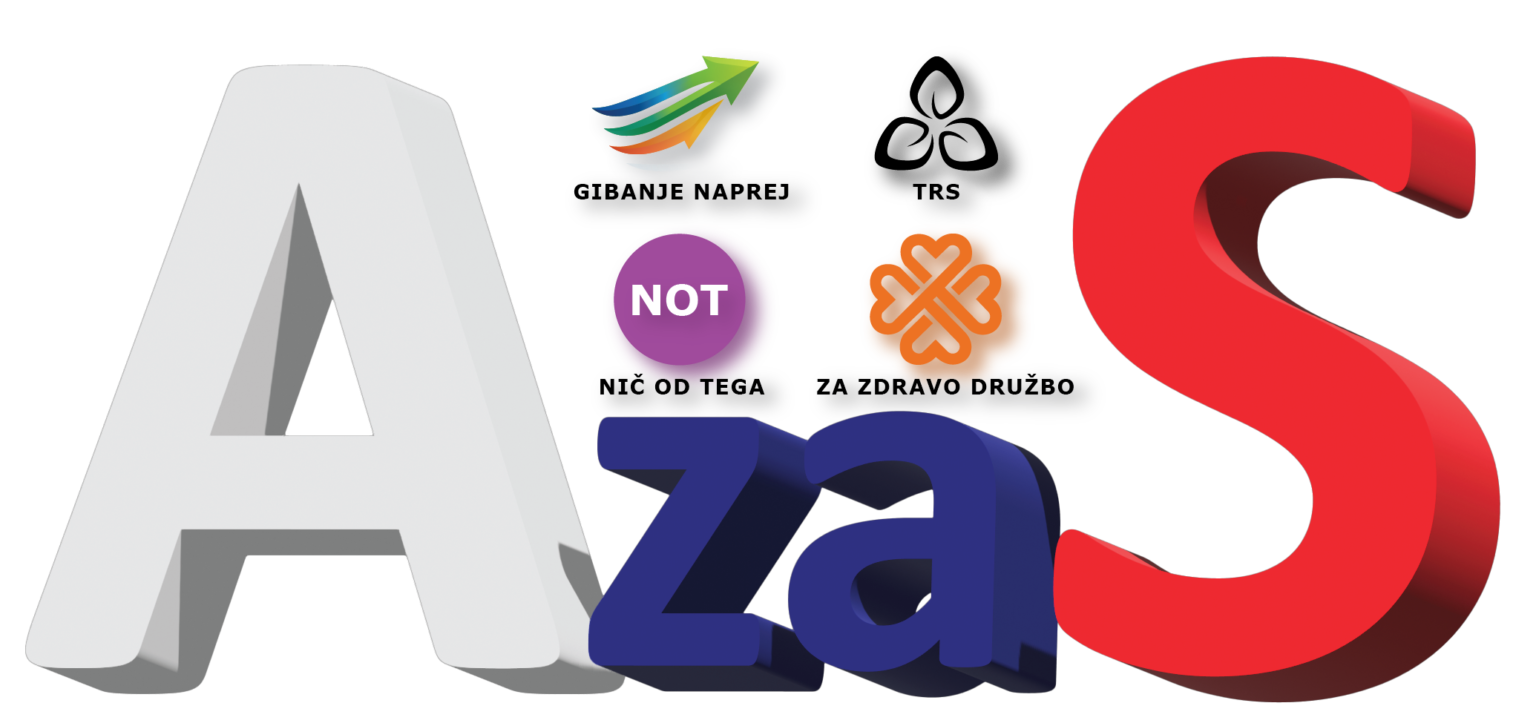
- Party Presidents: Violeta Tomić; Boris Žulj; Jure Pogačnik
- Founded: 19 January 2026
- Merger of: None of This; For a Healthy Society; Forward Movement; TRS Association; Civil Initiative FOR Pensioners
- Ideology: Anti-globalism; Sovereigntism; Populism; Soft Euroscepticism; Anti-vaccination
- Political position: Centre to centre-left
- Colors: White; Blue; Red
- National Assembly: 0 / 90
- European Parliament: 0 / 9
- Mayors: 0 / 212
- Municipal councillors: 0 / 2,750

Website
- Alternative for Slovenia

Alternative for Slovenia (Slovene: Alternativa za Slovenijo) is an alliance of two Slovenian extra-parliamentary political parties and three smaller movements that ran in the 2026 Slovenian parliamentary election. It is composed of None of This and For a Healthy Society, which first officially announced their candidacy on a joint list on 21 August 2025.

== History ==
On 21 August 2025, Jure Pogačnik, president of For a Healthy Society, and Violeta Tomić, vice-president of None of This, announced in a joint press release the beginning of cooperation between the parties, which would also include a joint list for the parliamentary elections. According to their statements, they also invited the party Resni.ca to cooperate, but it rejected the possibility of a joint electoral appearance.

In December 2025, a representative of None of This confirmed in an interview that talks were ongoing with For a Healthy Society, as well as with other movements such as Slovenia Against Russophobia and the Forward Movement.

On 19 January 2026, Jure Pogačnik (ZD), Violeta Tomić and Boris Žulj (NOT), together with representatives of smaller partner movements, announced a joint electoral list under the name Alternative for Slovenia at a press conference. They stated that they represent an alternative primarily to the left-wing political bloc and highlighted priorities such as the fight against systemic corruption, abolition of mandatory vaccination, advocacy for peace and a policy of non-alignment, and economic rapprochement with the BRICS countries. According to Tomić, the goal of the joint list is to enter parliament and “be an alternative to all existing parties.”

== Programme ==
=== Healthcare ===
In the field of healthcare, AZAS advocates the abolition of mandatory vaccination and opposes policies it sees as “imposed or centrally directed,” especially by the World Health Organization. It emphasizes national sovereignty in decisions regarding health measures. The programme also includes limiting electromagnetic radiation (particularly 5G) and reducing the use of chemical substances in the environment due to their impact on public health.

=== Foreign policy ===
The alliance advocates a “sovereign, neutral and peace-oriented foreign policy.” It is critical of the European Union and the NATO alliance and opposes Slovenia's involvement in military conflicts. Regarding the Russian invasion of Ukraine, it claims that “this is not a local conflict but a war of the NATO alliance against Russia.” It supports reducing militarisation, greater independence in foreign-policy decisions, focusing on diplomacy and dialogue, and closer relations with the BRICS countries.

=== Economy and taxation ===
The AZAS programme emphasizes economic sovereignty, opposition to deindustrialisation and the reduction of the influence of supranational economic centres. It advocates the protection of domestic production, food security and the preservation of non-genetically modified seeds. It proposes limiting pesticides and Glyphosate and promoting alternative agricultural solutions. In taxation, it advocates equal treatment of all entities, including religious institutions, and the “abolition of the financial privileges of the Church.” The programme also emphasises stricter measures against the non-payment of social contributions.

=== Fight against corruption ===
The programme foresees stronger prosecution of systemic corruption, stricter control over the legality of assets and more effective confiscation of illegally obtained funds. It proposes banning individuals connected to corrupt acts from holding leadership positions and examining the assets of related persons in bankruptcy cases. It also advocates banning the movement of senior personnel between regulators and regulated entities and strict enforcement of legislation on social contributions and the management of public assets.

== Partners ==
Political parties		Ideology	President	MPs at the time of the election	
Political parties		Ideology	President	National Assembly	Members of the European Parliament
NOT	None of This	Political satire Russophilia	Violeta Tomić	0 / 90	0 / 9
ZD	For a Healthy Society	Antiglobalism	Jure Pogačnik	0 / 90	0 / 9

== Election results ==
=== National Assembly ===
Election	Leader	Votes	%	Seats	+/–	Government
2026	Violeta Tomić; Boris Žulj; Jure Pogačnik	4,785	0.41 (#13)	0 / 90	New	Extra-parliamentary
