= Focus of Marko Lotrič =

Focus of Marko Lotrič FOKUS Marka Lotriča
- Abbreviation: FOKUS
- President: Marko Lotrič
- General Secretary: Monika Kirbiš Rojs
- Founded: 18 January 2025
- Ideology: Conservatism
- Political position: Centre-right
- National affiliation: Skupaj v Akcijo
- Colours: Blue, White, Light green
- National Assembly: 1 / 90
- European Parliament: 0 / 9
- Mayors: 0 / 212
- Municipal councillors: 1 / 2,750

Website
- fokus.center

Focus of Marko Lotrič (Slovene: FOKUS Marka Lotriča, short: Fokus) is a minor Slovenian political party founded by the President of the National Council of Slovenia and entrepreneur Marko Lotrič. The founding congress took place on 18 January 2025 at Brdo pri Kranju, where Lotrič was elected party president.

== History ==
Lotrič first publicly hinted at founding a new political party in autumn 2024, when he also began collecting signatures. He named businessman Igor Akrapovič, Marko Lukić, State Council Secretary Monika Kirbiš Rojs, and Žirovnica mayor Leopold Pogačar among his key early collaborators.

The party's logo and the date of the founding congress were announced on 13 January 2025. The congress took place on Saturday, 18 January 2025 at Brdo pri Kranju, where the party's programme was presented and its leadership bodies elected. In his address, Lotrič emphasized traditional values, free market economy, entrepreneurship, and lower taxation, while stressing a focus on “practical solutions over ideological issues.”

Prominent guests from other political parties attended the congress, including Aleš Hojs (vice-president of the Slovenian Democratic Party), Zdravko Počivalšek (former Minister for Economy) Matej Tonin (president of New Slovenia), Marko Balažic (then president of the Slovenian People's Party), Anže Logar (president of the Democrats), Janez Demšar (president of Concretely), and Smiljan Mekicar (president of Good State).

In 2025, the party actively participated in the campaign for the Referendum on the Pension Bonus for Cultural Figures, opposing the proposed law.

== Party Structure ==
- President: Marko Lotrič
- Vice-presidents: TBA
- President of the Party Council: TBA
- General Secretary: Monika Kirbiš Rojs
- Executive Committee (7 members): Brane Bertoncelj, Janko Heričko, Miha Istenič, Marko Staroveški, Rok Šimenc, Marjetka Šmid, Matej Tušak
- Supervisory Board (5 members): Jernej Bortolato, Ksenija Goričan, Anica Heričko, Simona Laznik, Štefan Lotrič
- Party Council: 21 members

== Election results ==
=== National Assembly ===
Election	Leader	Votes	%	Seats	+/–	Status
2026 (Note: Run in a joint list with NSi and SLS.)	Marko Lotrič	109,201	9.26 (#3)	1 / 90	New	Coalition
