= Unity (Slovenia) =

Sloga
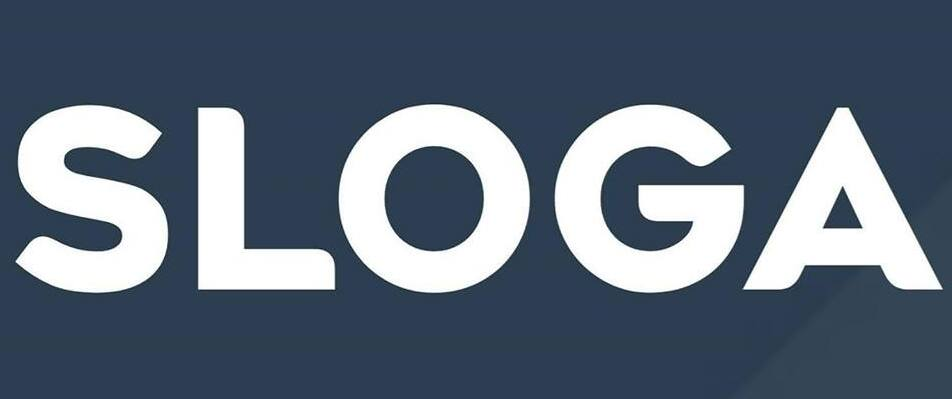
- President: Janko Veber
- Founded: 7 April 2018
- Headquarters: Trg zbora odposlancev 64; 1330 Kočevje
- Ideology: Liberalism; Populism
- Colours: Grey-blue
- Slogan: Strength is in Unity!
- National Assembly: 0 / 90
- European Parliament: 0 / 9
- Mayors: 0 / 212
- Municipal councillors: 2 / 2,750

SLOGA is a Slovenian extra-parliamentary political party founded by Janko Veber, former mayor of Kočevje, President of the National Assembly and MP of the Social Democrats. The founding congress took place on 7 April 2018 in Ljubljana, where Veber was elected president of the party.

== History ==
=== Background ===
On 19 December 2017, then MP Janko Veber left the Social Democrats parliamentary group, citing disagreements regarding voting positions.

On 8 January 2018, he also left the party itself, explaining that he could not agree with positions that “devalue everything that generations in Slovenia have created.”

The association Sloga existed before the official founding of the party. Veber announced the formation of the party on 8 March 2018 after collecting the required 200 verified signatures of support.

He stated that the party would not focus on ideology and emphasized priorities such as “returning power to the people” and “a dignified life with returns from common property for all citizens.”

=== Founding ===
The founding congress of the party took place on Saturday, 7 April 2018 in Ljubljana. Party bodies were elected, the party programme adopted and preparations for the parliamentary elections discussed.

In addition to Veber, speakers at the event included entrepreneur Matjaž Gams, economist Marko Golob and former UKC surgeon Zvonko Hočevar.

The party announced that it would seek an “immediate halt to the sale of citizens’ common property.”

== Election results ==
=== National Assembly ===
Election	Leader	Votes	%	Seats	+/–	Government
2018	Janko Veber	5,072	0.57 (#17)	0 / 90	New	Extra-parliamentary
2022	Janko Veber	564	0.05 (#19)	0 / 90	0	Extra-parliamentary
2026	Janko Veber	251	0.02 (#16)	0 / 90	0	Extra-parliamentary

=== 2018 parliamentary election ===
On the same day he left the Social Democrats, Veber announced an electoral alliance with the party Democratic Party of Labour.

The parties formed a joint electoral list. However, their list was rejected in one electoral district because it contained too many women candidates. Their appeal was unsuccessful.

In the election held on 3 June 2018 the coalition received 0.57% of the vote and failed to enter the National Assembly.

=== 2022 parliamentary election ===
In February 2022 Sloga joined the Alliance Liberate Slovenia (ZOS), formed around the party United Slovenia Movement led by Andrej Šiško.

The alliance received 0.05% of the vote and placed second to last among candidate lists.

=== 2026 parliamentary election ===
On 12 January 2026 MP Dejan Kaloh revealed in a television interview that Janko Veber would run on the list of the party Suvereni.

Later the cooperation collapsed after some candidates joined the list of the party Karl Erjavec - Trust Party. Sloga ultimately submitted its own candidate list only in the fourth electoral district (Ljubljana Bežigrad).

== Local elections ==
=== 2018 local elections ===
In the 2018 local elections Veber ran for mayor of Kočevje. He received 1,278 votes (19.11%) and lost in the first round to Vladimir Prebilič.

The Sloga list received 932 votes and won three seats in the municipal council.

=== 2022 local elections ===
Veber again ran for mayor in 2022, receiving 487 votes (8.26%). Prebilič won the election in the first round.

The Sloga list received 484 votes and won two seats in the municipal council.
