= Violeta Tomić =

Slovenian left-wing politician

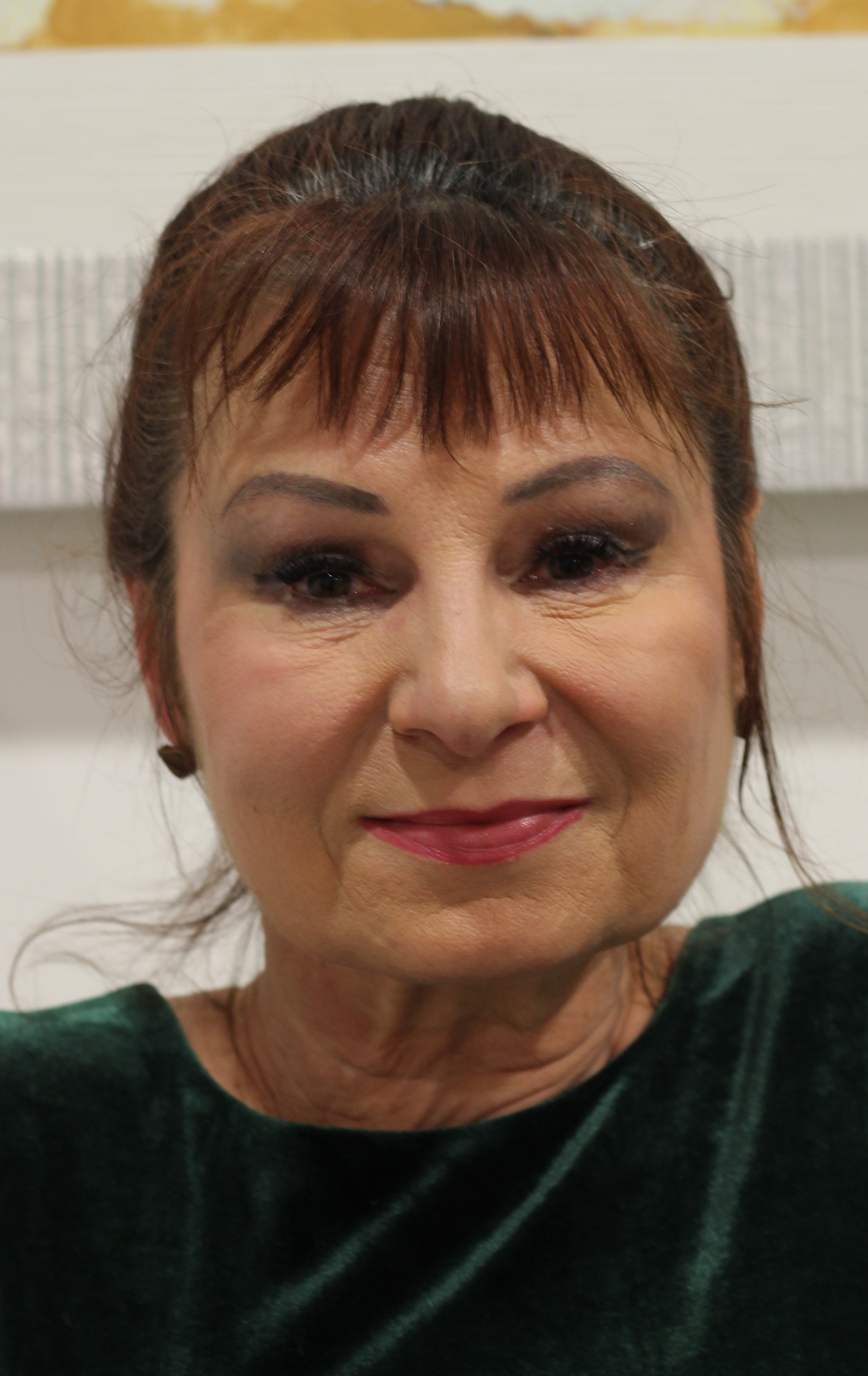
- in Ljubljana, 2022

Member of the National Assembly
- In office 13 July 2014 – 1 June 2022
- Constituency: Ljubljana Center

Personal details
- Born: 22 January 1963 (age 63) Sarajevo, PR Bosnia and Herzegovina, Yugoslavia
- Citizenship: Slovenian; Bosnian
- Party: Slovenian: None of the above EU: GUE/NGL
- Education: AGRFT

Violeta Tomić, sometimes known in Slovenian as Violeta Tomič (born 22 January 1963) is a Slovenian television presenter, actress, and politician serving as a deputy in the National Assembly. As a member of Party Our Future, founded by Ivan Gale, she was chosen as the lead candidate of the European United Left–Nordic Green Left group ahead of the 2019 European Parliament election but was not elected.

== Early life ==
Tomić was born on 22 January 1963 in Sarajevo. Her father was a musician in the Sarajevo National Theatre, and so she opted out of going to kindergarten and instead spent time at rehearsals at the theater which inspired her love for acting. Eventually, her mother and her went to Metlika, where she spent a lot of her life. They then moved again for her high school years to Črnomelj, and she took her entrance exams in Zagreb and Ljubljana. After graduating high school she studied at the Department of Drama at AGRFT in Ljubljana, graduating in 1985. Her very first role was as Jacinta in Ivan Cankar's Sentflorian Valley Scandal. Since then she has studied biodynamic methods of farming created by Rudolf Steiner and Marie Thun, which has led her to attempt to spread awareness of sustainable agriculture.

== Entertainment career ==
In 1987, she became employed at the Ljubljana City Theatre, a position she held until 2001, when she became a freelance artist. In the 1980s, she was part of the alternative art collective Neue Slowenische Kunst, which she stated led her to get condemned and monitored by the state security service.

Tomić hosted the Slovenian version of The Weakest Link quiz show, Najšibkejši člen.

== Political career ==
In 2010 she joined the Democratic Labour Party (DSD), where she has been vice-president of since 2013. In May 2013, she became leader of the United Left list which incorporated DSD.
