= Siol =

Slovenian internet portal

Siol.net is a Slovenian web media and the oldest news portal in Slovenia. It is owned and managed by TSmedia company that is itself owned by the Telekom Slovenije. The main contents cover daily politics, news, sports, technology, lifestyle, and motoring. Since November 2022, Mihael Šuštaršič serves as the editor-in-chief.

== History ==
Siol.net was established in 1996 by Telekom Slovenije. It was the first online news portal in Slovenia and has seen a number of visual changes over the years. Between 1999 and 2007, the portal was owned by Siol. In 2008 the ownership and management was taken over by Planet 9, which merged with the company Najdi on 1 April 2011. In September 2011 the company was renamed as TSmedia.

Siol news media should not be confused with SiOL, another part of Telekom Slovenije and is a cable TV, internet, and telephone provider and deals only with providing access and offering support for these services.

== Contents ==
- News: Slovenia and international daily news coverage, current affairs, interviews, reportages and columns.
- Business today: business news, tips for managing personal finances, articles on employment and the job market.
- Sports: information on sports with up-to-date sports results, interviews with known athletes, photo galleries and entertainment news. Added value is given by live coverage and an archive of sports events.
- Trends: lifestyle information including fashion and beauty trends, health, leisure, music news, movies’ presentations, travelogues and daily news on the world of entertainment.
- Planet TV: Siol.net is official web page of Slovenian broadcast channel Planet TV. This page features many TV shows and videos.
- Motoring: motoring information: cars' tests, trends and great video contents.
- Digiworld: news and innovations on technology, computing, telecommunications and the world of online and mobile games.
- TV Schedule: daily TV schedules with descriptions and ratings of movies and shows.
