= Resni.ca =

Political party in Slovenia

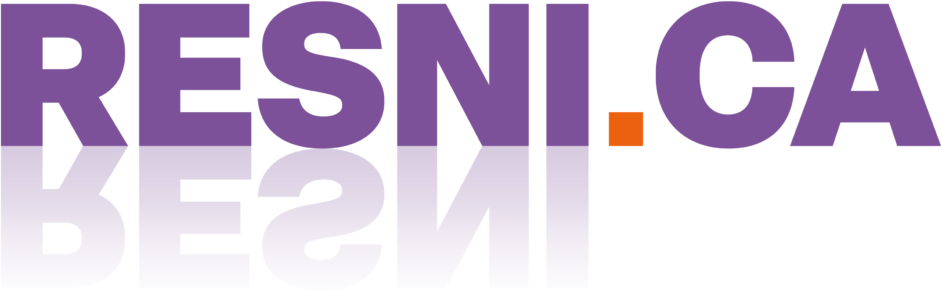
- Leader: Zoran Stevanović
- Founder: Zoran Stevanović
- Founded: 14 January 2021
- Preceded by: Zoran For Kranj
- Headquarters: Cigaletova ulica 4A, 1000 Ljubljana
- Ideology: Right-wing populism Economic liberalism Ultraconservatism; Sovereigntism; Anti-vaccination; Conspiracism
- Political position: Far-right
- European affiliation: Europe of Sovereign Nations Party (Since 2026)
- Colours: Purple; Orange
- Slogan: Moč ljudem! ('Power to the people!')
- National Assembly: 5 / 90
- European Parliament: 0 / 9
- Mayors: 0 / 212
- Municipal council: 1 / 2,750

Website
- resni.ca

Resni.ca (Slovene: [rɛsnìːt͡sa]) is a Slovenian political party, founded on 14 January 2021, and led by Zoran Stevanović. The party organized protests against the introduction of the "recovered, vaccinated, tested" measure for limiting the COVID-19 pandemic, which contributed to its visibility. The party's stated central issues are fighting corruption, national sovereignty, reducing taxes, opposition to COVID-19 pandemic lockdown measures, and reducing budget deficits and public debt.

== Overview ==
Former party logo

On 14 January 2021, the Resni.ca Citizens' Movement party was formed by Kranj City Councilor Zoran Stevanović and other like-minded individuals. The party is headquartered in Kranj.

According to Stevanović, its name represents the words "truth" (resnica) and "serious" (resni); the party represents truth (in contrast to the corrupt main political parties, which divide citizens into left- and right-wingers as they jostle to control public funds) and is serious about carrying out their goals. According to Stevanović, it was founded after requests by supporters. In a February 2021 interview, Stevanović said that the party had at least 37,000 "ambassadors" and "many more" supporters across the country. It was establishing a network of party representatives across Slovenia; contesting the upcoming parliamentary elections was the party's "first-order ambition", and it intended to stand in local and European elections. According to Stevanović, Resni.ca was not backed by any "lobbies or other power structures, which is also reflected in the fact that the mainstream media does not pay us even a second of attention ... I was called by journalists I know personally, who told me they had received instructions from their editors-in-chief that it was forbidden to report about us." According to the results of a Mediana poll, the newspaper Delo concluded in October 2021 that the party had little electoral potential.

In a December 2020 interview, Stevanović said that he wrote to Prime Minister Janez Janša to propose that Resni.ca and the government cooperate in finding solutions to ongoing challenges. He was active in Kranj municipal politics before the party was founded, standing twice for mayor and winning the same number of council seats with his Zoran Za Kranj electoral list as the local Slovenian Democratic Party (SDS) in the second election. Stevanović spoke at the January 2021 Kranj City Council session as a representative of Resni.ca, but did not answer a question about whether the party was the legal successor of the municipal Zoran Za Kranj list.

A former member of the Slovenian National Party (SNS), Stevanović said that he was invited to join the SNS in 2016 by party leader Zmago Jelinčič with promises to overhaul the party and fight corruption but soon realized that the party was "Jelinčič's personal political firm" and called his SNS membership a mistake. In 2018, as an SNS representative, he participated in a roundtable discussion on patriotism organized by the far-right Institute for Patriotic Values which was also attended by Andrej Šiško and SDS MP Branko Grims. A key Resni.ca figure also co-founded the far-right Homeland League party.

Resni.ca's increased visibility fueled speculation that the party might be a Slovenian Democratic Party satellite or Trojan horse, with which the SDS could secure enough parliamentary support for a coalition government under SDS leadership.

== History ==
The party was founded on 14 January 2021, headquartered in Kranj with Stevanović as party leader. On 3 October 2021, Stevanović wrote to the Slovenian government calling for the repeal of the "recovered, vaccinated, or tested" (RVT) measure and the resignation of the government. Stevanović wrote that the government bears "all responsibility for what is happening on the streets, squares and protocol locations", hinting that RVT protests might disrupt the EU-Western Balkans summit in Brdo pri Kranju. The following day, he met with the President Borut Pahor at the presidential palace. Pahor expressed his expectation that Stevanović would instruct the protesters to adhere to non-violence, and warned him that protesters choosing where they would protest was unacceptable. Stevanović suggested that Pahor call on the government to resign and lift its RVT measure, which the president rejected. Stevanović attended the meeting without a face covering.

On the morning of 7 October, the National Bureau of Investigations directed searches of party headquarters and Stevanović's home. Stevanović reportedly surrendered to police. The following day, The Reporter magazine said that it had received a written request from Resni.ca to withdraw a photograph of Stevanović's house. The letter threatened a lawsuit, but The Reporter said that filming or photographing private real estate from public areas was prohibited; the media routinely publishes such images during house searches, however, but The Reporter was not one of the media outlets which published pictures of Stevanović's house.

== Ideology ==
In Resni.ca's draft constitution, the party identified its core principles as the fight against corruption, opposition to political servility to the EU, opposition to "theft of funds through high taxes and excise duties", opposition to increasing government debt, opposition to "misappropriation of public funds", advocacy for higher wages and greater purchasing power of citizens, "improved conditions in health care and public administration" and "elimination of injustices suffered by our citizens". Stevanović said in a February 2021 interview that the party's goals were "ridding the country of corruption, establishing sovereignty, reducing taxes, increasing salaries by lowering of taxes and contributions, reforming the healthcare system from a state-administered one to a public one, increasing pensions, revitalizing the administrative state, and starting to reduce external debt."

=== Populism ===
Stevanović said in a December 2020 interview that he met the dictionary definition of a populist (someone "advocating something that is liked by the broad public"), and did not see populism as negative despite the term's negative political connotation. In a February 2021 interview, he said that the party's candidates would be "nominated by citizens" and prospective candidates had to prove that they had never been criminally convicted or involved in ongoing criminal proceedings. Stevanović expressed his belief that "[in Slovenia] we don't really have a left or a right wing. It's just two poles that falsely divide people based on attitudes towards recent history and marginal topics. So it's two wings of the same bird of prey, with one and the same interest, namely the control of public funds ..."

=== Economy ===
In a December 2020 interview about the party's goals, Stevanović proposed that Slovenia become a tax haven and said that the party advocated a €300 universal basic income which would replace existing social assistance and encourage citizens to seek employment.

=== Support of Russia ===
The position of Resni.ca regarding the Russo-Ukrainian war has been described as supporting Russia and Vladimir Putin. The party denies pro-Russian views.

One of the candidates for the 2024 European Parliament election, Bojan Potočnik, attended a farewell ceremony for Sergei Lemeshev, a Russian diplomat that Slovenia expelled after the Ministry of Internal Affairs revealed he conducted propaganda activities against Slovenia. 24ur.com reported that Lemeshev was also possibly involved in 2024 cyber attacks in Slovenia and paid Resni.ca to spread Russian propaganda. It was also reported that multiple other members of Resni.ca have had contact with Lemeshev. Regarding the expulsion Potočnik and party president Stevanović said, that they don't see any problems in close ties to the Russian spy. Stevanović described the expulsion as a "mistake".

In March 2024, the president of Resni.ca, Zoran Stevanović, posted a video on social networks titled "The truth about Ukraine". In the video he called the Russian invasion of Ukraine a "military intervention". Fact-checking done by Siol.net concluded that the video included a number of false claims that mirrored those made by the Russian government.

=== Party program ===
Resni.ca's party program is:

- Fight corruption and economic crime: fight corruption through legislative change and the establishment of departments in the prosecutor's office and police and a special court for the speedy evaluation of corruption cases, abolish the statute of limitations for economic crimes, suspend and audit all potentially-corrupt infrastructure projects, audit all major privatisations of state-owned companies
- Sovereignism in relation to international organisations, "re-evaluation of Slovenia's status in the EU, ECB, UN and NATO systems", "moratorium on the adoption and implementation of binding or principled international acts, especially if they are not in accordance with the Slovenian Constitution, national legislation, or were not approved by referendum"
- Reduction of public debt to avoid bankruptcy and dependence on international organisations, elimination of the budget deficit and enshrining balanced state budgets in the constitution
- Reduction of taxes and duties: reduction of the average effective tax rate (initially to 33 percent), abolition of progressive taxation and introduction of a flat tax, "significant increase in wages through lowering taxes and contributions", "reduction of all taxes", reduction of excise duties on energy, abolition of climate taxes, real-estate taxes and other "unjust taxes"
- Pension reform: significant increase in pensions at the expense of funds saved through the elimination of corruption and "vitalisation of the state administration", reorganisation of the pension system, and "overhauling of the exceptional pensions system"
- Ending compulsory vaccination
- Reorganisation of NGO funding
- Reorganisation of public institutions and agencies
- Abolition of all welfare payments and introduction of universal basic income as a replacement for welfare payments
- Tightening conditions for acquiring citizenship, linking social rights to citizenship, "abolition of privileges for certain social groups and minorities and making all citizens of the Republic of Slovenia equal before the law", adoption of measures to prevent abuses of asylum legislation
- Reorganisation of the labor market, ensuring a competitive labor market for Slovenian citizens
- Reorganisation of the Slovenian Army, training of the SAF for territorial operation in Slovenia instead of within NATO
- Reorganisation of the judiciary
- Decriminalisation of cannabis
- Protection of key natural resources (such as water) and ban on their privatisation; promotion of organic farming, restriction of the use of plant-protection products in agriculture, promotion of the reprocessing of "waste plastics into petroleum products", promotion of wood management, promotion of economic hemp, promotion of hemp biodiesel as an alternative to fossil-fuel imports
- Introduction of direct democracy, including e-elections and e-referendums, changing the electoral system in accordance with the Constitutional Court
- Reform of the public education system and curricula, emphasizing higher education
- Moratorium on the introduction of the 5G system "until all the effects of the technology on human health are fully clarified"
- Preserving the current vignette highway tax system
- Unconditional freedom of speech

== Election results ==
=== National Assembly ===
Election	Leader	Votes	%	Seats	+/–	Government
2022	Zoran Stevanović	34.107	2.86 (#8)	0 / 90	New	Extra-parliamentary
2026	Zoran Stevanović	64,799	5.49 (#7)	5 / 90	▲5	Support

=== European Parliament ===
Election	List leader	Votes	%	Seats	+/–	EP Group
2024	Zoran Stevanović	26,767	3.97 (#8)	0 / 9	New	–

=== Presidential ===
Election	Candidate	1st round		2nd round		Result
Election	Candidate	Votes	%	Votes	%	Result
2022 (Note: In coalition with For the People of Slovenia)	Sabina Senčar	51,767	5.94			Lost

== See also ==
- List of political parties in Slovenia
