= Karl Erjavec - Trust Party =

Slovenian political party

Trust Zaupanje
- President: Karl Erjavec
- General Secretary: Zlatko Ficko
- Vice Presidents: Naila Sluga; Robert Latin
- President of the Party Council: Boris Štefanec
- Founded: 27 November 2024
- Dissolved: 24 September 2026
- Split from: Democratic Party of Pensioners of Slovenia
- Headquarters: Ferdo Kozak Street 50; 1000 Ljubljana
- Ideology: Pensioners' interests
- Political position: Centre
- European affiliation: European Democratic Party (Note: Erjavec is vice president of the Europarty)
- Colours: Purple; Light blue
- National Assembly: 0 / 90
- European Parliament: 0 / 9
- Mayors: 0 / 212
- Municipal councillors: 0 / 2,750

Website
- zaupanje.eu

The Karl Erjavec - Trust Party (Slovene: Karl Erjavec -Stranka Zaupanje, SZ) is a Slovene political party founded by former DeSUS president and longtime politician Karl Erjavec. The founding congress of the party took place on 27 November 2024, where Erjavec was elected president. Their slogan is For a Safe Future.

Among the prominent members of the new party are former Minister of the Economy Metod Dragonja, former Interior Minister Dragutin Mate, former Minister of Justice Lilijana Kozlovič, former UN ambassador Andrej Logar, former ambassador Milan Jazbec, former Environment Minister Irena Majcen, and former president of the Commission for the Prevention of Corruption Boris Štefanec. According to Erjavec, economist Jože P. Damijan and the first governor of the Bank of Slovenia France Arhar also contributed to drafting the programme.

== History ==
Erjavec first publicly mentioned the new political project in July 2024, when he announced the formation of the Assembly for the Future, which would later evolve into a centrist political party formed by former politicians. At the end of September 2024, he revealed four pillars on which the new party would operate: pensioners, healthcare and education; security and migration; economy and agriculture; and climate policy.

== Election results ==
=== National Assembly ===
Election	Leader	Votes	%	Seats	+/–	Government
2026	Karl Erjavec	2,995	0.25 (#15)	0 / 90	New	Extra-parliamentary
