= Democrats (Slovenia) =

Political party founded 2023

Anže Logar’s Democrats. Demokrati. Anžeta Logarja
- President: Anže Logar
- Founder: Anže Logar
- Founded: 31 May 2023 (Cooperation Platform association); 16 November 2024 (Democrats party)
- Split from: Slovenian Democratic Party
- Headquarters: Kamniška ulica 47, 1000 Ljubljana
- Youth wing: Mladi Demokrati.
- Ideology: Conservative liberalism
- Political position: Centre-right
- Colours: Blue; Cyan
- National Assembly: 6 / 90
- European Parliament: 0 / 9
- Mayors: 1 / 212
- Municipal council: 39 / 2,750

Website
- demokrati.si (Democrats) www.sodelujmo.si (Cooperation Platform)

Democrats, whose full name is Anže Logar's Democrats. (Slovene: Demokrati. Anžeta Logarja), is a centre-right political party in Slovenia, founded by Anže Logar, a long-time member of the Slovenian Democratic Party (SDS) and a former foreign minister. The party's founding congress took place on 16 November 2024 in Maribor, where Logar was elected president of the party.

== History ==
=== Background ===
After the 2022 presidential election, there was speculation about the future path of Anže Logar, not least because he had won more votes than his SDS party in that year's parliamentary election. On 13 November 2022, after the second round had concluded, Logar said: "Today we are at the beginning of something big". There were rumors that Logar would found his own party, but in the spring of 2023 he announced the founding of the "Cooperation Platform" association.

On 24 November 2023, Logar resigned from the position of president of the SDS Council, emphasizing in a press statement that he would direct his efforts to the Cooperation Platform. On 6 December 2023, the SDS executive committee assessed that everything indicated that Logar would establish his own party, and SDS expected that the deputies elected on its list would respect the will of the voters and finish their mandate in accordance with the SDS mandate. The executive committee did not expel Anže Logar from the party, but it assessed that "further appearances and positions of MP Anže Logar can no longer be automatically considered SDS positions, but positions of a new party in the making".

On 9 October 2024, Logar sent his resignation from the SDS to party president Janez Janša, and a day later announced the creation of a new party by the end of 2024. Eva Irgl also announced her joining the party. MP Dejan Kaloh, who also left SDS, denied joining Logar's party. Kaloh later founded his own party, Suvereni, on 20 June 2025.

=== Establishment ===
On 24 October 2024, Logar revealed that the party will be called the Democrats, as the name "emphasises the political breath that the party wants to represent on the new path".

The congress of the new party was held on 16 November 2024 in Maribor. It approved the program and charter, and elected other party bodies. In his speech, Party President Logar emphasized that "the state and politics must serve the people" and announced the creation of a "large program coalition", naming political breadth and the fight against corruption as his priorities. It also supports decentralisation.

== Election results ==
=== National Assembly ===
Election	Leader	Votes	%	Seats	+/–	Status
2026	Anže Logar	78,902	6.69 (#5)	6 / 90	New	Coalition
