= Maribor (National Assembly constituency) =

Constituency in Slovenia

- Constituency for the National Assembly
- Location of Maribor within Slovenia
- Municipality: List: Bistrica ob Sotli; Duplek; Hoče-Slivnica; Kozje; Lovrenc na Pohorju; Makole; Maribor; Miklavž na Dravskem Polju; Oplotnica; Podčetrtek; Poljčane; Rače-Fram; Rogaška Slatina; Rogatec; Ruše; Selnica ob Dravi; Slovenska Bistrica; Slovenske Konjice; Šmarje pri Jelšah; Starše; Vitanje; Zreče
- Population: 261,907 (2025)
- Electorate: 206,713 (2026)
- Area: 1,543 km^{2} (2024)

Current Constituency
- Created: 1992
- Seats: 11 (1992–present)
- Deputies: List: Karmen Furman (SDS); Lena Grgurevič (Svoboda); Katja Kokot (Resni.ca); Franc Križan (D); Tomaž Lah (Svoboda); Martin Mikolič (NSi); Bojan Podkrajšek (SDS); Andreja Rajbenšu (Svoboda); Darko Ratajc (SD); Vladimir Šega (Levica); Anton Šturbej (SDS)
- Electoral districts: List: Maribor 1; Maribor 2; Maribor 3; Maribor 4; Maribor 5; Maribor 6; Maribor 7; Ruše; Slovenska Bistrica; Slovenska Konjice; Šmarje pri Jelšah

Maribor, officially known as the 7th constituency (Slovene: 7. volilna enota), is one of the eight multi-member constituencies (electoral units) of the National Assembly, the national legislature of Slovenia. The constituency was established in 1992 following Slovenia's independence from Yugoslavia. It consists of the municipalities of Bistrica ob Sotli, Duplek, Hoče-Slivnica, Kozje, Lovrenc na Pohorju, Makole, Maribor, Miklavž na Dravskem Polju, Oplotnica, Podčetrtek, Poljčane, Rače-Fram, Rogaška Slatina, Rogatec, Ruše, Selnica ob Dravi, Slovenska Bistrica, Slovenske Konjice, Šmarje pri Jelšah, Starše, Vitanje and Zreče. The constituency currently elects 11 of the 90 members of the National Assembly using the open party-list proportional representation electoral system. At the 2026 parliamentary election the constituency had 206,713 registered electors.

== History ==
The 7th constituency (Maribor) was one of the eight constituencies established by the Determination of Constituencies for the Election of Deputies to the National Assembly Act (ZDVEDZ) (Zakon o določitvi volilnih enot za volitve poslancev v državni zbor (ZDVEDZ)) passed by the Assembly of the Republic of Slovenia (Skupščina Republike Slovenije) in September 1992. It consisted of the municipalities of Maribor, Ruše, Slovenska Bistrica, Slovenske Konjice and Šmarje pri Jelšah.

Following the re-organisation of municipalities in October 1994, parts of Maribor municipality were transferred to the newly created municipalities of Duplek, Rače-Fram and Starše; parts of Slovenske Konjice municipality were transferred to the newly created municipalities of Vitanje and Zreče; and parts of Šmarje pri Jelšah municipality was split into the newly created municipalities of Kozje, Podčetrtek, Rogaška Slatina and Rogatec.

In August 1998 parts of Maribor municipality were transferred to the newly created municipalities of Hoče-Slivnica and Miklavž na Dravskem Polju; parts of Podčetrtek municipality were transferred to the newly created Bistrica ob Sotli municipality; parts of Ruše municipality were transferred to the newly created municipalities of Lovrenc na Pohorju and Selnica ob Dravi; and parts of Slovenska Bistrica municipality were transferred to the newly created Oplotnica municipality. Makole and Poljčane municipalities was created from parts of Slovenska Bistrica municipality in June 2006.

In February 2021 the National Assembly passed Amendments and Supplements to the Determination of Constituencies for the Election of Deputies to the National Assembly Act (ZDVEDZ-B) (Zakon o spremembah in dopolnitvah Zakona o določitvi volilnih enot za volitve poslancev v državni zbor (ZDVEDZ-B)) which defined the Maribor constituency as consisting of the municipalities of Bistrica ob Sotli, Duplek, Hoče-Slivnica, Kozje, Lovrenc na Pohorju, Maribor, Miklavž na Dravskem polju, Makole, Oplotnica, Podčetrtek, Poljčane, Rače Fram, Rogaška Slatina, Rogatec, Ruše, Selnica ob Dravi, Slovenska Bistrica, Slovenske Konjice, Šmarje pri Jelšah, Starše, Vitanje in Zreče.

== Electoral system ==
Maribor currently elects 11 of the 90 members of the National Assembly using the open party-list proportional representation electoral system. Each constituency is divided into 11 electoral districts (volilni okraji) in which each party stands a single candidate. Electors vote for a candidate of their choice in their electoral district and then the votes received by each party's candidates are aggregated at the constituency level.

Allocation of seats was carried out in two stages. In the first stage, seats are allocated to parties at the constituency level using the Droop quota (Hare quota prior to 2006). In the second stage, unallocated seats from the first stage are aggregated at the national level and allocated to parties using the D'Hondt method (any seats won by the party at the constituency level are subtracted from the party's national seats). Though calculated nationally, national seats are allocated at the constituency level.

Since 2000, only parties that reach the 4% national threshold compete for seats at both constituency and national levels. Prior to this there was no threshold at the constituency level but parties needed to reach 3/88 (c3.4%) to compete for seats at the national level.

Seats won by each party in a constituency are allocated to the candidates with the highest percentage of votes. As a consequence, multiple candidates may be elected from an electoral district whilst others may have no candidates elected. Prior to 2000 parties had the option to have up to 50% of their national seats allocated in the order they appear on their party list (closed list).

== Electoral districts ==
Maribor is divided into 11 electoral districts:

- 1. Šmarje pri Jelšah - municipalities of Bistrica ob Sotli, Kozje, Podčetrtek, Rogaška Slatina, Rogatec and Šmarje pri Jelšah.
- 2. Slovenska Bistrica - municipalities of Makole, Oplotnica, Poljčane, Slovenska Bistrica (except Bukovec, Gabernik, Gaj, Kočno pri Polskavi, Ogljenšak, Pokoše, Pragersko, Sele pri Polskavi, Spodnja Polskava, Zgornja Polskava and parts of Kalše) and Zreče (Zlakova only).
- 3. Slovenska Konjice - municipalities of Slovenske Konjice, Vitanje and Zreče (except Zlakova).
- 4. Ruše - municipalities of Lovrenc na Pohorju, Ruše and Selnica ob Dravi.
- 5. Maribor 1 - municipalities of Hoče-Slivnica (Hočko Pohorje, Polana, Slivniško Pohorje and parts of Pivola, Spodnje Hoče and Zgornje Hoče only), Maribor (Bresternica, Gaj nad Mariborom, Hrastje, Jelovec, Kamnica, Laznica, Limbuš, Pekre, Srednje, Šober, Vrhov Dol and parts of Maribor, Rošpoh, Vinarje and Zgornji Slemen only), Rače-Fram and Slovenska Bistrica (Bukovec, Gabernik, Gaj, Kočno pri Polskava, Ogljenšak, Pokoše, Pragersko, Sele pri Polskava, Spodnja Polskava, Zgornja Polskava and parts of Kalše only).
- 6. Maribor 2 - municipalities of Hoče-Slivnica (except Hočko Pohorje, Polana, Slivniško Pohorje and parts of Pivola, Spodnje Hoče and Zgornje Hoče), Maribor (part of Maribor only), Miklavž na Dravskem Polju and Starše.
- 7. Maribor 3 - municipalities of Duplek and Maribor (Celestrina, Dogoše, Grušova, Hrenca, Malečnik, Meljski Hrib, Metava, Nebova, Počehova, Ruperče, Trčova, Vodole, Zrkovci and parts of Maribor only).
- 8. Maribor 4 - municipality of Maribor (Pekel, Ribniško selo, Za Kalvarijo and parts of Maribor and Vinarje only).
- 9. Maribor 5 - municipality of Maribor (parts of Maribor and Razvanje only).
- 10. Maribor 6 - municipality of Maribor (parts of Maribor and Razvanje only).
- 11. Maribor 7 - municipality of Maribor (parts of Maribor only).

== Election results ==
=== Summary ===
Election	Left Levica / ZL / TRS			Social Democrats SD / ZLSD / ZL			Freedom Movement Svoboda			Positive Slovenia PS / LZJ-PS			Liberal Democracy LDS			Let's Connect PoS / SMC			Slovenian People's SLS / SLS-SMS / SLS-SKD			Christian Democrats SKD			New Slovenia NSi			Slovenian Democrats SDS / SDSS			Slovenian Nationalists SNS		
Election	Votes	%	Seats	Votes	%	Seats	Votes	%	Seats	Votes	%	Seats	Votes	%	Seats	Votes	%	Seats	Votes	%	Seats	Votes	%	Seats	Votes	%	Seats	Votes	%	Seats	Votes	%	Seats
2026	6,603	4.75%	0	9,451	6.80%	0	39,481	28.39%	3										with NSi						9,844	7.08%	0	42,766	30.75%	3	4,356	3.13%	0
2022	5,571	3.98%	0	8,577	6.12%	0	47,996	34.26%	4							7,371	5.26%	0	with PoS						7,104	5.07%	0	35,157	25.09%	3	2,699	1.93%	0
2018	8,871	8.47%	1	9,537	9.10%	1										12,041	11.49%	1	3,281	3.13%	0				6,075	5.80%	0	26,071	24.88%	2	6,535	6.24%	0
2014	5,632	5.45%	0	5,469	5.30%	0				1,879	1.82%	0				37,790	36.60%	4	3,731	3.61%	0				4,107	3.98%	0	20,402	19.76%	2	3,285	3.18%	0
2011	1,787	1.38%	0	14,171	10.97%	1				27,688	21.43%	2	1,540	1.19%	0				9,328	7.22%	0				4,246	3.29%	0	38,881	30.09%	3	2,872	2.22%	0
2008				31,379	25.25%	3							5,752	4.63%	0				7,376	5.94%	0	451	0.36%	0	2,866	2.31%	0	36,022	28.99%	3	7,678	6.18%	0
2004				10,464	9.11%	1							23,045	20.06%	2				9,020	7.85%	0				7,828	6.82%	0	33,990	29.59%	3	10,570	9.20%	1
2000				11,422	9.08%	1							47,739	37.95%	4				13,945	11.09%	1	with SLS			7,898	6.28%	0	18,548	14.74%	1	6,547	5.20%	0
1996				8,643	7.00%	0							30,214	24.46%	2				28,538	23.10%	2	9,384	7.60%	0				17,594	14.24%	1	4,271	3.46%	0
1992				23,226	16.11%	1							35,254	24.46%	2				11,524	7.99%	0	16,788	11.65%	1				7,028	4.88%	0	10,734	7.45%	0

(Excludes national seats. Figures in italics represent alliances/joint lists.)

=== Detailed ===
Party has received at least 4% of the vote nationally (since 2000).

==== 2020s ====
===== 2026 =====
Results of the 2026 parliamentary election held on 22 March 2026:

Party		Votes per electoral district											Total votes	%	Seats		
Party		Maribor 1	Maribor 2	Maribor 3	Maribor 4	Maribor 5	Maribor 6	Maribor 7	Ruše	Slovenska Bistrica	Slovenska Konjice	Šmarje pri Jelšah	Total votes	%	Con.	Nat.	Tot.
Slovenian Democratic Party	SDS	4,620	4,095	4,049	1,737	2,424	2,418	1,826	2,220	7,103	5,725	6,549	42,766	30.75%	3	0	3
Freedom Movement	Svoboda	5,081	4,500	3,165	2,845	3,565	3,823	2,888	2,680	4,091	2,937	3,906	39,481	28.39%	3	0	3
New Slovenia – Christian Democrats, Slovenian People's Party and Focus	NSi-SLS- FOKUS	1,242	925	697	376	516	545	327	472	1,310	1,358	2,076	9,844	7.08%	0	1	1
Democrats	D	1,268	1,099	777	582	737	675	464	626	1,094	908	1,527	9,757	7.02%	0	1	1
Social Democrats	SD	1,035	1,011	624	674	696	871	511	681	1,077	1,218	1,053	9,451	6.80%	0	1	1
Resni.ca	Resni.ca	1,054	1,078	897	374	645	621	494	613	910	512	945	8,143	5.85%	0	1	1
The Left and Vesna – Green Party	Levica-Vesna	843	611	448	872	691	664	536	520	559	334	525	6,603	4.75%	0	1	1
Slovenian National Party	SNS	417	444	297	157	270	205	243	232	759	448	884	4,356	3.13%	0	0	0
Prerod	Prerod	413	331	273	240	293	294	214	210	353	263	366	3,250	2.34%	0	0	0
Pirate Party	Pirati	360	308	257	216	277	266	206	182	291	234	297	2,894	2.08%	0	0	0
Voice of Pensioners	GU	58	39	63	49	61	48	52	33	63	63	69	598	0.43%	0	0	0
Greens of Slovenia and Party of Generations	ZS-SG	60	81	31	21	45	44	25	17	138	59	59	580	0.42%	0	0	0
We, Socialists!	MI!	46	60	37	46	53	41	60	26	51	37	59	516	0.37%	0	0	0
Alternative for Slovenia	AzaS	67	43	38	34	52	49	28	30	65	39	54	499	0.36%	0	0	0
Karl Erjavec - Trust Party	SZ	31	31	14	31	26	14	26	48	59	28	40	348	0.25%	0	0	0
Valid votes		16,595	14,656	11,667	8,254	10,351	10,578	7,900	8,590	17,923	14,163	18,409	139,086	100.00%	6	5	11
Rejected votes		138	100	109	59	100	103	82	65	164	133	225	1,278	0.91%			
Total polled		16,733	14,756	11,776	8,313	10,451	10,681	7,982	8,655	18,087	14,296	18,634	140,364	67.90%			
Registered electors		23,702	21,160	17,408	13,845	16,994	15,745	13,288	12,516	25,170	19,000	27,885	206,713				
Turnout		70.60%	69.74%	67.65%	60.04%	61.50%	67.84%	60.07%	69.15%	71.86%	75.24%	66.82%	67.90%				

The following candidates were elected:

- Constituency seats - Karmen Furman (SDS, Slovenske Bistrica), 7,103 votes; Lena Grgurevič (Svoboda, Maribor 4), 2,845 votes; Tomaž Lah (Svoboda, Maribor 6), 3,823 votes; Bojan Podkrajšek (SDS, Slovenske Konjice), 5,725 votes; Andreja Rajbenšu (Svoboda, Maribor 7), 2,888 votes; and Anton Šturbej (SDS, Šmarje pri Jelšah), 6,549 votes.
- National seats - Katja Kokot (Resni.ca, Maribor 3), 897 votes; Franc Križan (D, Šmarje pri Jelšah), 1,527 votes; Martin Mikolič (NSi-SLS-FOKUS, Šmarje pri Jelšah), 2,076 votes; Darko Ratajc (SD, Slovenske Konjice), 1,218 votes; and Vladimir Šega (Levica, Maribor 4), 872 votes.

===== 2022 =====
Results of the 2022 parliamentary election held on 24 April 2022:

Party		Votes per electoral district											Total votes	%	Seats		
Party		Maribor 1	Maribor 2	Maribor 3	Maribor 4	Maribor 5	Maribor 6	Maribor 7	Ruše	Slovenska Bistrica	Slovenska Konjice	Šmarje pri Jelšah	Total votes	%	Con.	Nat.	Tot.
Freedom Movement	Svoboda	6,226	5,644	3,844	3,617	4,255	4,629	3,516	3,180	4,913	3,663	4,509	47,996	34.26%	4	1	5
Slovenian Democratic Party	SDS	3,692	3,637	2,925	1,554	2,060	2,164	1,718	1,961	5,871	4,926	4,649	35,157	25.09%	3	1	4
Social Democrats	SD	1,072	938	602	610	675	796	560	635	949	856	884	8,577	6.12%	0	1	1
Let's Connect Slovenia	PoS	864	331	1,018	185	212	278	175	184	1,218	714	2,192	7,371	5.26%	0	0	0
New Slovenia – Christian Democrats	NSi	764	711	448	337	399	456	297	391	792	752	1,757	7,104	5.07%	0	0	0
The Left	Levica	674	552	433	627	546	605	485	435	445	320	449	5,571	3.98%	0	1	1
Resni.ca		599	563	448	237	413	327	351	337	612	284	537	4,708	3.36%	0	0	0
List of Marjan Šarec	LMŠ	494	447	274	310	333	377	264	333	404	316	397	3,949	2.82%	0	0	0
Party of Alenka Bratušek	SAB	359	344	289	325	306	382	267	198	301	169	292	3,232	2.31%	0	0	0
Slovenian National Party	SNS	279	256	164	98	128	128	125	118	452	652	299	2,699	1.93%	0	0	0
Our Country		254	238	233	80	123	120	106	131	435	344	548	2,612	1.86%	0	0	0
Pirate Party		283	232	194	177	189	225	181	151	250	163	235	2,280	1.63%	0	0	0
For a Healthy Society	ZSi	245	295	156	210	181	197	120	113	285	178	196	2,176	1.55%	0	0	0
Our Future and Good Country	SNP-DD	190	213	150	115	170	194	136	94	212	129	262	1,865	1.33%	0	0	0
Vesna – Green Party		214	167	159	193	147	135	112	172	157	121	142	1,719	1.23%	0	0	0
For the People of Slovenia	ZLS	201	149	138	55	123	114	85	68	142	75	138	1,288	0.92%	0	0	0
Democratic Party of Pensioners of Slovenia	DeSUS	82	97	55	60	74	62	66	108	143	66	132	945	0.67%	0	0	0
List of Boris Popovič – Let's Digitize Slovenia	LBP	41	43	70	24	30	30	30	38	63	36	52	457	0.33%	0	0	0
Homeland League	DOM	25	16	23	13	30	13	22	11	19	29	25	226	0.16%	0	0	0
United Slovenia	ZSi	20	21	15	5	9	21	17	6	20	12	22	168	0.12%	0	0	0
Valid votes		16,578	14,894	11,638	8,832	10,403	11,253	8,633	8,664	17,683	13,805	17,717	140,100	100.00%	7	4	11
Rejected votes		131	113	119	67	121	89	90	69	171	143	248	1,361	0.96%			
Total polled		16,709	15,007	11,757	8,899	10,524	11,342	8,723	8,733	17,854	13,948	17,965	141,461	67.92%			
Registered electors		23,511	21,181	17,439	14,209	16,737	16,215	14,247	12,684	25,292	19,050	27,716	208,281				
Turnout		71.07%	70.85%	67.42%	62.63%	62.88%	69.95%	61.23%	68.85%	70.59%	73.22%	64.82%	67.92%				

The following candidates were elected:

- Constituency seats - Karmen Furman (SDS, Slovenske Bistrica), 5,871 votes; Lena Grgurevič (Svoboda, Maribor 4), 3,617 votes; Barbara Kolenko Helbl (Svoboda, Maribor 5), 4,255 votes; Martin Marzidovšek (Svoboda, Maribor 7), 3,516 votes; Bojan Podkrajšek (SDS, Slovenske Konjice), 4,926 votes; Anton Šturbej (SDS, Šmarje pri Jelšah), 4,649 votes; and Rastislav Vrečko (Svoboda, Maribor 6), 4,629 votes.
- National seats - Tatjana Greif (Levica, Maribor 4), 627 votes; Dejan Kaloh (SDS, Maribor 3), 2,925 votes; Bojana Muršič (SD, Ruše), 635 votes; and Andreja Rajbenšu (Svoboda, Maribor 2), 5,644 votes.

Substitutions:

- Barbara Kolenko Helbl (Svoboda, Maribor 5) forfeited her seat on 9 June 2022 upon being appointed to the government and was replaced by Tomaž Lah (Svoboda, Maribor 1) on 21 June 2022.
- Martin Marzidovšek (Svoboda, Maribor 7) resigned on 18 September 2023 and was replaced by Jurij Lep (Svoboda, Ruše) on 20 September 2023.

==== 2010s ====
===== 2018 =====
Results of the 2018 parliamentary election held on 3 June 2018:

Party		Votes per electoral district											Total votes	%	Seats		
Party		Maribor 1	Maribor 2	Maribor 3	Maribor 4	Maribor 5	Maribor 6	Maribor 7	Ruše	Slovenska Bistrica	Slovenska Konjice	Šmarje pri Jelšah	Total votes	%	Con.	Nat.	Tot.
Slovenian Democratic Party	SDS	2,202	2,694	2,500	1,358	1,520	1,750	1,411	1,375	4,651	3,297	3,313	26,071	24.88%	2	1	3
Modern Centre Party	SMC	1,164	1,164	893	886	901	1,088	705	618	1,242	878	2,502	12,041	11.49%	1	1	2
List of Marjan Šarec	LMŠ	1,058	1,260	906	601	856	957	816	736	1,616	991	1,067	10,864	10.37%	1	0	1
Social Democrats	SD	964	1,034	700	791	742	905	640	729	1,228	1,080	724	9,537	9.10%	1	0	1
The Left	Levica	903	814	669	1,155	881	1,020	801	719	859	422	628	8,871	8.47%	1	0	1
Slovenian National Party	SNS	504	678	489	281	440	421	394	453	1,100	1,006	769	6,535	6.24%	0	1	1
New Slovenia – Christian Democrats	NSi	500	538	455	303	368	339	239	301	812	742	1,478	6,075	5.80%	0	0	0
Democratic Party of Pensioners of Slovenia	DeSUS	412	565	373	356	482	514	443	757	798	379	538	5,617	5.36%	0	1	1
Party of Alenka Bratušek	SAB	472	517	395	413	439	500	370	238	481	255	373	4,453	4.25%	0	1	1
Slovenian People's Party	SLS	295	233	145	37	68	49	44	41	1,338	659	372	3,281	3.13%	0	0	0
Pirate Party		192	204	166	211	172	184	128	95	276	130	161	1,919	1.83%	0	0	0
Good Country	DD	190	211	112	161	144	167	102	70	210	102	163	1,632	1.56%	0	0	0
Andrej Čuš and Greens of Slovenia	AČZS	107	235	169	108	104	82	90	68	291	107	109	1,470	1.40%	0	0	0
List of Journalist Bojan Požar	LNBP	171	140	119	142	104	129	99	51	100	58	82	1,195	1.14%	0	0	0
United Right		98	87	570	67	70	79	54	32	51	45	35	1,188	1.13%	0	0	0
Save Slovenia from Elite and Tycoons	ReSET	108	168	154	86	90	130	90	59	61	17	17	980	0.94%	0	0	0
United Slovenia	ZSi	53	114	78	44	81	70	129	60	132	86	102	949	0.91%	0	0	0
For a Healthy Society	ZD	59	56	46	61	55	56	32	30	86	30	39	550	0.52%	0	0	0
United Left and Unity	ZLS	79	42	33	25	33	44	48	22	43	50	95	514	0.49%	0	0	0
Movement Together Forward	GSN	31	54	41	37	29	43	27	50	42	23	29	406	0.39%	0	0	0
Solidarity–For a Fair Society!		30	37	17	19	14	6	17	15	35	14	22	226	0.22%	0	0	0
Economic Active Party	GAS	27	32	16	22	15	23	19	12	25	9	17	217	0.21%	0	0	0
Party of Slovenian People	SSN	24	32	25	7	12	14	10	9	28	18	21	200	0.19%	0	0	0
Valid votes		9,643	10,909	9,071	7,171	7,620	8,570	6,708	6,540	15,505	10,398	12,656	104,791	100.00%	6	5	11
Rejected votes		99	105	97	60	82	77	78	66	170	102	132	1,068	1.01%			
Total polled		9,742	11,014	9,168	7,231	7,702	8,647	6,786	6,606	15,675	10,500	12,788	105,859	49.66%			
Registered electors		18,636	21,278	19,064	14,763	16,851	16,929	15,267	13,071	30,380	19,126	27,800	213,165				
Turnout		52.28%	51.76%	48.09%	48.98%	45.71%	51.08%	44.45%	50.54%	51.60%	54.90%	46.00%	49.66%				

The following candidates were elected:

- Constituency seats - Lidija Divjak Mirnik (LMŠ, Maribor 7), 816 votes; Karmen Furman (SDS, Slovenske Bistrica), 4,651 votes; Bojana Muršič (SD, Ruše), 729 votes; Zdravko Počivalšek (SMC, Šmarje pri Jelšah), 2,502 votes; Bojan Podkrajšek (SDS, Slovenske Konjice), 3,297 votes; and Franc Trček (Levica, Maribor 4), 1,155 votes.
- National seats - Zmago Jelinčič Plemeniti (SNS, Ruše & Slovenske Konjice), 1,459 votes; Dejan Kaloh (SDS, Maribor 3), 2,500 votes; Jurij Lep (DeSUS, Ruše), 757 votes; Andrej Rajh (SAB, Maribor 6), 500 votes; and Branislav Rajić (SMC, Maribor 6), 1,088 votes.

Substitutions:

- Zdravko Počivalšek (SMC, Šmarje pri Jelšah) forfeited his seat on 13 September 2018 upon being elected to the government and was replaced by Gregor Židan (SMC, Maribor 4) on 26 September 2018.

===== 2014 =====
Results of the 2014 parliamentary election held on 13 July 2014:

Party		Votes per electoral district											Total votes	%	Seats		
Party		Maribor 1	Maribor 2	Maribor 3	Maribor 4	Maribor 5	Maribor 6	Maribor 7	Ruše	Slovenska Bistrica	Slovenska Konjice	Šmarje pri Jelšah	Total votes	%	Con.	Nat.	Tot.
Modern Centre Party	SMC	3,764	3,943	3,087	2,983	3,118	3,672	2,778	2,298	4,783	3,105	4,259	37,790	36.60%	4	1	5
Slovenian Democratic Party	SDS	1,732	2,126	1,971	1,142	1,260	1,433	1,088	1,151	3,328	2,383	2,788	20,402	19.76%	2	0	2
Democratic Party of Pensioners of Slovenia	DeSUS	1,174	1,334	1,061	839	1,157	1,170	1,245	958	2,011	1,001	1,437	13,387	12.96%	1	1	2
United Left	ZL	512	530	482	560	544	592	496	439	594	415	468	5,632	5.45%	0	1	1
Social Democrats	SD	590	546	361	445	414	563	366	523	686	541	434	5,469	5.30%	0	1	1
New Slovenia – Christian Democrats	NSi	300	337	292	213	234	190	161	143	637	603	997	4,107	3.98%	0	0	0
Alliance of Alenka Bratušek	ZaAB	382	419	300	387	384	402	313	229	432	308	305	3,861	3.74%	0	0	0
Slovenian People's Party	SLS	335	292	682	66	93	115	65	141	773	625	544	3,731	3.61%	0	0	0
Slovenian National Party	SNS	323	374	348	176	255	292	257	183	437	348	292	3,285	3.18%	0	0	0
Positive Slovenia	PS	120	191	134	180	203	196	183	82	285	135	170	1,879	1.82%	0	0	0
Pirate Party		146	146	141	139	137	113	0	60	155	87	127	1,251	1.21%	0	0	0
Verjamem		99	87	50	76	69	106	84	138	127	66	66	968	0.94%	0	0	0
Greens of Slovenia	ZS	48	61	67	43	52	59	57	37	86	40	64	614	0.59%	0	0	0
Civic List	DL	42	33	29	20	35	33	26	38	118	39	138	551	0.53%	0	0	0
Equal Land–Forward Slovenia	ED-NPS	22	17	26	8	18	19	18	20	25	17	25	215	0.21%	0	0	0
Economically Liberal Party	LGS	27	14	8	7	7	13	6	5	18	9	7	121	0.12%	0	0	0
Valid votes		9,616	10,450	9,039	7,284	7,980	8,968	7,143	6,445	14,495	9,722	12,121	103,263	100.00%	7	4	11
Rejected votes		107	139	145	65	117	98	107	66	184	168	179	1,375	1.31%			
Total polled		9,723	10,589	9,184	7,349	8,097	9,066	7,250	6,511	14,679	9,890	12,300	104,638	48.74%			
Registered electors		18,698	21,098	19,073	15,022	17,353	17,264	15,822	13,209	30,149	19,215	27,797	214,700				
Turnout		52.00%	50.19%	48.15%	48.92%	46.66%	52.51%	45.82%	49.29%	48.69%	51.47%	44.25%	48.74%				

The following candidates were elected:

- Constituency seats - Srečko Blažič (SMC, Maribor 6), 3,672 votes; Vinko Gorenak (SDS, Šmarje pri Jelšah), 2,788 votes; Jasna Murgel (SMC, Maribor 5), 3,118 votes; Bojan Podkrajšek (SDS, Slovenske Konjice), 2,383 votes; Ivan Prelog (SMC, Maribor 1), 3,764 votes; Uroš Prikl (DeSUS, Maribor 7), 1,245 votes; and Branislav Rajić (SMC, Maribor 7), 2,778 votes.
- National seats - Marjana Kotnik Poropat (DeSUS, Ruše), 958 votes; Ksenija Korenjak Kramar (SMC, Maribor 2), 3,943 votes; Bojana Muršič (SD, Ruše), 523 votes; and Franc Trček (ZL, Maribor 4), 560 votes.

Substitutions:

- Srečko Blažič (SMC, Maribor 6) resigned on 2 March 2015 and was replaced by Bojan Krajnc (SMC, Maribor 3) on 3 March 2015.

===== 2011 =====
Results of the 2011 parliamentary election held on 4 December 2011:

Party		Votes per electoral district											Total votes	%	Seats		
Party		Maribor 1	Maribor 2	Maribor 3	Maribor 4	Maribor 5	Maribor 6	Maribor 7	Ruše	Slovenska Bistrica	Slovenska Konjice	Šmarje pri Jelšah	Total votes	%	Con.	Nat.	Tot.
Slovenian Democratic Party	SDS	3,235	3,983	3,750	2,059	2,531	2,767	2,423	2,357	6,241	4,167	5,368	38,881	30.09%	3	0	3
Zoran Janković's List – Positive Slovenia	LZJ-PS	2,520	2,697	2,004	2,591	2,707	2,969	2,330	1,386	3,121	2,317	3,046	27,688	21.43%	2	1	3
Social Democrats	SD	1,534	1,495	1,037	1,341	1,241	1,461	1,154	852	1,972	960	1,124	14,171	10.97%	1	1	2
Gregor Virant's Civic List	LGV	1,274	1,447	1,099	876	951	1,186	860	899	1,750	987	1,214	12,543	9.71%	1	0	1
Democratic Party of Pensioners of Slovenia	DeSUS	981	1,244	871	695	1,019	1,059	971	920	1,735	1,017	1,505	12,017	9.30%	1	0	1
Slovenian People's Party	SLS	831	940	1,612	300	359	404	337	489	1,741	1,119	1,196	9,328	7.22%	0	1	1
New Slovenia – Christian People's Party	NSi	288	349	301	215	242	193	194	189	551	639	1,085	4,246	3.29%	0	0	0
Slovenian National Party	SNS	297	384	263	153	263	269	208	188	281	248	318	2,872	2.22%	0	0	0
Party for Sustainable; Development of Slovenia	TRS	214	147	138	265	183	194	154	86	173	93	140	1,787	1.38%	0	0	0
Liberal Democracy of Slovenia	LDS	143	125	85	109	92	103	75	394	127	111	176	1,540	1.19%	0	0	0
Youth Party – European Greens	SMS-Z	152	116	108	78	93	123	62	113	123	55	62	1,085	0.84%	0	0	0
Democratic Labour Party	DSD	93	82	75	58	46	62	63	62	78	66	73	758	0.59%	0	0	0
Zares		38	100	25	47	54	42	37	18	163	141	56	721	0.56%	0	0	0
Greens of Slovenia	ZS	57	65	54	65	57	64	48	27	76	54	51	618	0.48%	0	0	0
Movement for Slovenia	GZS	11	103	30	9	26	10	8	11	17	10	19	254	0.20%	0	0	0
Party of Equal Opportunities	SEM-Si	16	18	15	26	22	13	13	11	35	13	29	211	0.16%	0	0	0
Party of Slovenian People	SSN	7	16	10	13	28	12	8	9	21	27	20	171	0.13%	0	0	0
Forward Slovenia	NPS	17	15	68	0	0	0	0	0	27	17	23	167	0.13%	0	0	0
Party of Humane Slovenia	SHS	21	9	10	11	15	9	12	8	24	0	18	137	0.11%	0	0	0
Valid votes		11,729	13,335	11,555	8,911	9,929	10,940	8,957	8,019	18,256	12,041	15,523	129,195	100.00%	8	3	11
Rejected votes		177	260	260	120	248	218	226	217	288	245	372	2,631	2.00%			
Total polled		11,906	13,595	11,815	9,031	10,177	11,158	9,183	8,236	18,544	12,286	15,895	131,826	61.21%			
Registered electors		18,703	21,000	19,121	15,286	17,659	17,432	15,952	13,257	29,978	19,151	27,818	215,357				
Turnout		63.66%	64.74%	61.79%	59.08%	57.63%	64.01%	57.57%	62.13%	61.86%	64.15%	57.14%	61.21%				

The following candidates were elected:

- Constituency seats - Borut Ambrožič (LZJ-PS, Maribor 4), 2,591 votes; Vinko Gorenak (SDS, Šmarje pri Jelšah), 5,368 votes; Jožef Jerovšek (SDS, Slovenska Bistrica), 6,241 votes; Marjana Kotnik Poropat (DeSUS, Ruše), 920 votes; Truda Pepelnik (LGV, Ruše), 899 votes; Majda Potrata (SD, Maribor 4), 1,341 votes; Mateja Pučnik (SDS, Slovenske Konjice), 4,167 votes; and Peter Vilfan (LZJ-PS, Maribor 5), 2,707 votes.
- National seats - Dragan Bosnić (LZJ-PS, Maribor 6), 2,969 votes; Matevž Frangež (SD, Maribor 6), 1,461 votes; and Janez Ribič (SLS, Maribor 3), 1,612 votes.

Substitutions:

- Vinko Gorenak (SDS, Šmarje pri Jelšah) forfeited his seat on 10 February 2012 upon being elected to the government and was replaced by Ivan Pišek (SDS, Maribor 2) on 14 February 2012.
- Truda Pepelnik (LGV, Ruše) resigned on 28 December 2012 and was replaced by Branko Kurnjek (LGV, Maribor 2) on 28 January 2013.
- Ivan Pišek (SDS, Maribor 2) forfeited his seat on 20 March 2013 when Vinko Gorenak (SDS, Šmarje pri Jelšah) lost his government position, regaining his seat.
- Peter Vilfan (LZJ-PS, Maribor 5) resigned on 14 May 2014 and was replaced by Alenka Lampe (LZJ-PS, Maribor 7) on the same day.

==== 2000s ====
===== 2008 =====
Results of the 2008 parliamentary election held on 21 September 2008:

Party		Votes per electoral district											Total votes	%	Seats		
Party		Maribor 1	Maribor 2	Maribor 3	Maribor 4	Maribor 5	Maribor 6	Maribor 7	Ruše	Slovenska Bistrica	Slovenska Konjice	Šmarje pri Jelšah	Total votes	%	Con.	Nat.	Tot.
Slovenian Democratic Party	SDS	3,035	3,810	3,129	2,104	2,369	2,743	2,199	2,037	5,527	4,072	4,997	36,022	28.99%	3	0	3
Social Democrats	SD	3,170	3,065	2,381	3,143	3,165	3,610	2,801	1,635	3,405	1,967	3,037	31,379	25.25%	3	0	3
Democratic Party of Pensioners of Slovenia	DeSUS	948	1,137	790	851	1,130	1,107	1,130	1,397	1,533	943	1,919	12,885	10.37%	1	0	1
Zares		1,182	977	827	1,340	982	1,142	954	501	1,654	1,241	863	11,663	9.38%	1	0	1
Slovenian National Party	SNS	664	843	627	360	599	546	489	667	1,083	880	920	7,678	6.18%	0	1	1
Slovenian People's Party and Youth Party of Slovenia	SLS-SMS	955	409	1,785	131	209	294	134	209	2,098	589	563	7,376	5.94%	0	1	1
Liberal Democracy of Slovenia	LDS	405	786	306	464	431	587	300	989	590	486	408	5,752	4.63%	0	1	1
Lipa		344	683	539	256	409	566	433	157	284	164	199	4,034	3.25%	0	0	0
New Slovenia – Christian People's Party	NSi	149	192	175	154	168	126	130	97	296	387	992	2,866	2.31%	0	0	0
List for Justice and Development	LPR	222	558	184	169	231	232	417	137	132	41	58	2,381	1.92%	0	0	0
Greens of Slovenia	ZS	89	87	66	79	91	74	71	41	109	66	46	819	0.66%	0	0	0
Christian Democratic Party	SKD	31	40	49	44	37	29	39	21	43	65	53	451	0.36%	0	0	0
Party of Slovenian People	SSN	31	40	36	32	41	23	30	31	54	26	65	409	0.33%	0	0	0
List for Clear Drinking Water	LZČPV	31	30	24	35	34	33	28	25	39	34	36	349	0.28%	0	0	0
Green Coalition: Green Party and Green Progress	ZL-ZP	19	27	26	14	28	16	9	14	31	16	11	211	0.17%	0	0	0
Valid votes		11,275	12,684	10,944	9,176	9,924	11,128	9,164	7,958	16,878	10,977	14,167	124,275	100.00%	8	3	11
Rejected votes		176	193	272	114	187	149	185	180	328	175	317	2,276	1.80%			
Total polled		11,451	12,877	11,216	9,290	10,111	11,277	9,349	8,138	17,206	11,152	14,484	126,551	58.85%			
Registered electors		18,397	20,784	18,975	15,717	17,626	17,856	16,498	13,280	29,471	18,963	27,486	215,053				
Turnout		62.24%	61.96%	59.11%	59.11%	57.36%	63.16%	56.67%	61.28%	58.38%	58.81%	52.70%	58.85%				

The following candidates were elected:

- Constituency seats - Bogdan Čepič (SD, Maribor 5), 3,165 votes; Matevž Frangež (SD, Maribor 6), 3,610 votes; Vinko Gorenak (SDS, Šmarje pri Jelšah), 4,997 votes; Jožef Jerovšek (SDS, Slovenska Bistrica), 5,527 votes; Rudolf Petan (SDS, Slovenske Konjice), 4,072 votes; Majda Potrata (SD, Maribor 4), 3,143 votes; Vili Rezman (DeSUS, Ruše), 1,397 votes; and Ivo Vajgl (Zares, Maribor 4), 1,340 votes.
- National seats - Ljubo Germič (LDS, Ruše), 989 votes; Silven Majhenič (SNS, Slovenske Konjice), 4,072 votes; and Janez Ribič (SLS-SMS, Maribor 3), 1,785 votes.

Substitutions:

- Ivo Vajgl (Zares, Maribor 4) forfeited his seat on 1 July 2009 upon being elected to the European Parliament and was replaced by Tadej Slapnik (Zares, Slovenske Konjice) on 15 July 2009.

===== 2004 =====
Results of the 2004 parliamentary election held on 3 October 2004:

Party		Votes per electoral district											Total votes	%	Seats		
Party		Maribor 1	Maribor 2	Maribor 3	Maribor 4	Maribor 5	Maribor 6	Maribor 7	Ruše	Slovenska Bistrica	Slovenska Konjice	Šmarje pri Jelšah	Total votes	%	Con.	Nat.	Tot.
Slovenian Democratic Party	SDS	2,817	3,736	2,602	2,278	2,362	2,739	2,359	2,089	5,900	3,815	3,293	33,990	29.59%	3	0	3
Liberal Democracy of Slovenia	LDS	2,065	2,123	1,498	2,316	2,186	2,412	2,057	1,736	2,264	2,442	1,946	23,045	20.06%	2	1	3
Slovenian National Party	SNS	872	1,569	818	788	935	1,431	963	647	937	684	926	10,570	9.20%	1	0	1
United List of Social Democrats	ZLSD	935	818	586	1,130	1,152	1,073	885	564	1,150	895	1,276	10,464	9.11%	1	0	1
Slovenian People's Party	SLS	1,131	591	2,546	181	205	203	283	208	1,992	704	976	9,020	7.85%	0	1	1
New Slovenia – Christian People's Party	NSi	544	663	644	580	549	553	467	379	824	879	1,746	7,828	6.82%	0	1	1
Democratic Party of Pensioners of Slovenia	DeSUS	507	526	331	489	730	502	649	1,001	622	273	1,180	6,810	5.93%	0	1	1
Slovenia is Ours	SN	564	414	309	223	412	708	317	299	233	161	461	4,101	3.57%	0	0	0
Youth Party of Slovenia	SMS	194	213	156	125	140	201	173	184	539	149	364	2,438	2.12%	0	0	0
Active Slovenia	AS	164	237	129	203	136	175	133	81	324	539	302	2,423	2.11%	0	0	0
Greens of Slovenia	ZS	77	67	99	113	82	108	77	31	60	36	64	814	0.71%	0	0	0
June List	JL	64	54	60	93	91	109	68	27	70	55	101	792	0.69%	0	0	0
Women's Voice of Slovenia, Association for Primorska, Union of Independents of Slovenia and New Democracy of Slovenia	GZS- ZZP- ZNS- NDS	64	76	54	83	57	88	85	35	48	28	26	644	0.56%	0	0	0
Party of Ecological; Movements of Slovenia	SEG	53	45	43	39	53	57	43	31	67	140	30	601	0.52%	0	0	0
List for Enterprising Slovenia	PS	81	59	75	53	81	44	19	35	37	79	35	598	0.52%	0	0	0
Democratic Party of Slovenia	DS	26	30	26	29	25	33	32	15	28	16	14	274	0.24%	0	0	0
Party of Slovenian People	SSN	21	16	26	15	24	17	25	18	23	19	36	240	0.21%	0	0	0
United for an Independent and Just Slovenia		4	8	11	7	9	12	6	10	18	9	11	105	0.09%	0	0	0
Social Liberal Party	LS	14	5	7	9	9	7	10	9	7	8	15	100	0.09%	0	0	0
Valid votes		10,197	11,250	10,020	8,754	9,238	10,472	8,651	7,399	15,143	10,931	12,802	114,857	100.00%	7	4	11
Rejected votes		186	221	223	146	239	205	184	163	322	266	392	2,547	2.17%			
Total polled		10,383	11,471	10,243	8,900	9,477	10,677	8,835	7,562	15,465	11,197	13,194	117,404	55.85%			
Registered electors		17,864	19,960	18,408	15,971	17,281	18,372	16,687	12,929	28,213	18,236	26,297	210,218				
Turnout		58.12%	57.47%	55.64%	55.73%	54.84%	58.12%	52.95%	58.49%	54.82%	61.40%	50.17%	55.85%				

The following candidates were elected:

- Constituency seats - Srečko Hvauc (SDS, Maribor 2), 3,736 votes; Jožef Jerovšek (SDS, Slovenska Bistrica), 5,900 votes; Rudi Moge (LDS, Maribor 4), 2,316 votes; Sašo Peče (SNS, Maribor 6), 1,431 votes; Rudolf Petan (SDS, Slovenske Konjice), 3,815 votes; Milan Petek (LDS, Maribor 8), 2,057 votes; and Majda Potrata (ZLSD, Maribor 4), 1,130 votes.
- National seats - Ljubo Germič (LDS, Ruše), 1,736 votes; Franc Kangler (SLS, Maribor 3), 2,546 votes; Martin Mikolič (NSi, Šmarje pri Jelšah), 1,746 votes; and Vili Rezman (DeSUS, Ruše), 1,001 votes.

Substitutions:

- Franc Kangler (SLS, Maribor 3) resigned on 5 March 2007 and was replaced by Ivan Žagar (SLS, Slovenska Bistrica) on 9 March 2007.
- Ivan Žagar (SLS, Slovenska Bistrica) forfeited his seat on 9 March 2007 upon being elected to the government and was replaced by Marjan Drofenik (SLS, Šmarje pri Jelšah) on the same day.

===== 2000 =====
Results of the 2000 parliamentary election held on 15 October 2000:

Party		Votes per electoral district											Total votes	%	Seats		
Party		Maribor 1	Maribor 2	Maribor 3	Maribor 4	Maribor 5	Maribor 6	Maribor 7	Ruše	Slovenska Bistrica	Slovenska Konjice	Šmarje pri Jelšah	Total votes	%	Con.	Nat.	Tot.
Liberal Democracy of Slovenia	LDS	4,153	4,715	3,505	4,617	4,604	4,920	4,215	3,529	4,571	4,352	4,558	47,739	37.95%	4	0	4
Social Democratic Party of Slovenia	SDSS	1,450	1,617	1,450	1,327	1,325	1,562	1,204	934	3,284	2,381	2,014	18,548	14.74%	1	1	2
Slovenian People's Party and Slovene Christian Democrats	SLS-SKD	1,935	926	2,201	368	361	650	634	410	2,957	1,250	2,253	13,945	11.09%	1	0	1
United List of Social Democrats	ZLSD	1,041	1,029	719	1,322	1,349	1,406	1,189	560	1,764	345	698	11,422	9.08%	1	0	1
Democratic Party of Pensioners of Slovenia	DeSUS	679	692	665	708	796	616	903	763	1,089	507	1,240	8,658	6.88%	0	1	1
New Slovenia – Christian People's Party	NSi	620	700	864	621	697	540	515	441	800	999	1,101	7,898	6.28%	0	1	1
Slovenian National Party	SNS	525	1,017	515	511	549	1,028	539	379	578	513	393	6,547	5.20%	0	1	1
Youth Party of Slovenia	SMS	355	444	372	335	383	444	382	220	583	738	576	4,832	3.84%	0	0	0
Women's Voice of Slovenia	GŽS	133	142	176	206	219	220	180	115	173	87	173	1,824	1.45%	0	0	0
Greens of Slovenia	ZS	82	112	50	70	131	86	60	55	80	43	177	946	0.75%	0	0	0
Democratic Party of Slovenia	DS	49	63	85	77	71	73	58	140	38	47	53	754	0.60%	0	0	0
New Party	NS	42	79	30	59	59	55	41	24	51	46	87	573	0.46%	0	0	0
Regional Party of Styria	DSŠ	37	63	35	61	31	19	42	33	120	45	65	551	0.44%	0	0	0
Party of Democratic Action of Slovenia	SDAS	21	30	45	35	76	44	52	39	22	25	40	429	0.34%	0	0	0
Mirko Justin (Independent)	Ind	8	15	7	11	18	15	16	8	23	27	256	404	0.32%	0	0	0
Forward Slovenia	NPS	17	28	29	30	17	27	35	14	23	19	48	287	0.23%	0	0	0
Milan Robič (Independent)	Ind	22	15	14	15	17	11	8	113	14	7	25	261	0.21%	0	0	0
Valter Skok (Independent)	Ind	20	16	37	19	25	12	18	2	6	10	13	178	0.14%	0	0	0
Valid votes		11,189	11,703	10,799	10,392	10,728	11,728	10,091	7,779	16,176	11,441	13,770	125,796	100.00%	7	4	11
Rejected votes		333	416	426	310	428	363	422	298	566	419	595	4,576	3.51%			
Total polled		11,522	12,119	11,225	10,702	11,156	12,091	10,513	8,077	16,742	11,860	14,365	130,372	63.07%			
Registered electors		17,616	18,716	17,699	16,537	17,682	18,519	17,130	12,640	27,229	17,460	25,496	206,724				
Turnout		65.41%	64.75%	63.42%	64.72%	63.09%	65.29%	61.37%	63.90%	61.49%	67.93%	56.34%	63.07%				

The following candidates were elected:

- Constituency seats - Ljubo Germič (LDS); Franc Kangler (SLS-SKD); Leo Kremžar (LDS); Rudi Moge (LDS); Tone Partljič (LDS); Rudolf Petan (SDSS); and Majda Potrata (ZLSD).
- National seats - Jožef Jerovšek (SDSS); Ivan Kebrič (DeSUS); Sašo Peče (SNS); and Marija Ana Tisovic (NSi).

==== 1990s ====
===== 1996 =====
Results of the 1996 parliamentary election held on 10 November 1996:

Party		Votes per electoral district											Total votes	%	Seats		
Party		Maribor 1	Maribor 2	Maribor 3	Maribor 4	Maribor 5	Maribor 6	Maribor 7	Ruše	Slovenska Bistrica	Slovenska Konjice	Šmarje pri Jelšah	Total votes	%	Con.	Nat.	Tot.
Liberal Democracy of Slovenia	LDS	2,722	2,469	2,154	2,858	2,486	3,273	2,621	1,888	3,298	3,499	2,946	30,214	24.46%	2	1	3
Slovenian People's Party	SLS	3,120	2,751	3,449	1,860	2,119	2,377	2,258	1,313	3,288	1,812	4,191	28,538	23.10%	2	1	3
Social Democratic Party of Slovenia	SDSS	1,308	1,377	1,286	1,396	1,338	1,454	1,198	878	3,237	2,101	2,021	17,594	14.24%	1	1	2
Democratic Party of Pensioners of Slovenia	DeSUS	951	1,133	1,014	1,216	1,703	1,004	1,752	842	1,026	659	1,359	12,659	10.25%	1	0	1
Slovene Christian Democrats	SKD	673	981	432	516	530	462	390	934	1,174	1,800	1,492	9,384	7.60%	0	0	0
United List of Social Democrats	ZLSD	674	500	375	1,449	1,107	1,338	692	447	1,079	397	585	8,643	7.00%	0	1	1
Slovenian National Party	SNS	449	502	295	351	399	513	401	324	449	319	269	4,271	3.46%	0	1	1
Democratic Party of Slovenia	DS	234	199	200	306	333	280	208	201	180	128	144	2,413	1.95%	0	0	0
Slovenian Craftsmen and Entrepreneurial; Party and Centrum Party	SOPS	211	210	209	164	108	153	150	151	231	148	466	2,201	1.78%	0	0	0
Greens of Slovenia	ZS	160	191	130	217	176	185	147	94	295	135	160	1,890	1.53%	0	0	0
Green Alternative of Slovenia	ZA	85	125	80	93	186	132	75	97	109	68	106	1,156	0.94%	0	0	0
Communist Party of Slovenia	KPS	0	78	86	108	128	113	128	52	94	59	94	940	0.76%	0	0	0
Liberal Party	LS	51	63	46	57	47	50	42	24	48	68	145	641	0.52%	0	0	0
Slovenian Forum	SF	27	27	23	55	36	87	62	51	30	22	66	486	0.39%	0	0	0
National Labour Party	NSD	41	54	39	44	35	32	40	34	52	36	65	472	0.38%	0	0	0
Slovenian National Right	SND	36	52	43	24	46	45	49	23	51	24	61	454	0.37%	0	0	0
Republican Association of Slovenia	RZS	24	34	27	18	17	27	27	27	52	52	57	362	0.29%	0	0	0
Christian Social Union	KSU	57	35	18	26	26	25	19	11	50	23	61	351	0.28%	0	0	0
New Party	NS	31	38	28	18	33	32	23	9	40	31	58	341	0.28%	0	0	0
Tonček Anton Kos (Independent)	Ind	29	30	22	46	43	26	40	35	22	20	15	328	0.27%	0	0	0
Patriotic United Retirement Party and League for Slovenia	DEUS-LZS	0	0	0	0	74	0	105	0	0	0	0	179	0.14%	0	0	0
Valid votes		10,883	10,849	9,956	10,822	10,970	11,608	10,427	7,435	14,805	11,401	14,361	123,517	100.00%	6	5	11
Rejected votes													8,146	6.19%			
Total polled													131,663	65.01%			
Registered electors													202,536				
Turnout													65.01%				

The following candidates were elected:

- Constituency seats - Jožef Jerovšek (SDSS); Franc Kangler (SLS); Ivan Kebrič (DeSUS); Jožef Košir (LDS); Tone Partljič (LDS) and Franc Potočnik (SLS).
- National seats - Anton Bergauer (SLS); Peter Lešnik (SNS); Rudi Moge (LDS); Rudolf Petan (SDSS); and Boris Sovič (ZLSD).

Substitutions:

- Anton Bergauer (SLS) forfeited his seat on 27 February 1997 upon being elected to the government and was replaced by Štefan Klinc (SLS) on 25 March 1997.
- Boris Sovič (ZLSD) forfeited his seat on 13 January 1999 upon being elected Mayor of Maribor and was replaced by Jože Jagodnik (ZLSD) on 22 January 1999.
- Peter Lešnik (SNS) died on 8 March 2000 and was replaced by Sašo Peče (SNS) on 21 March 2000.

===== 1992 =====
Results of the 1992 parliamentary election held on 6 December 1992:

Party		Votes	%	Seats		
Party		Votes	%	Con.	Nat.	Tot.
Liberal Democracy of Slovenia	LDS	35,254	24.46%	2	1	3
United List	ZL	23,226	16.11%	1	1	2
Slovene Christian Democrats	SKD	16,788	11.65%	1	0	1
Slovenian People's Party	SLS	11,524	7.99%	0	1	1
Slovenian National Party	SNS	10,734	7.45%	0	1	1
Social Democratic Party of Slovenia	SDSS	7,028	4.88%	0	1	1
Democratic Party of Slovenia	DS	6,670	4.63%	0	0	0
Greens of Slovenia	ZS	5,831	4.04%	0	1	1
Socialist Party of Slovenia	SSS	4,097	2.84%	0	0	0
Styrian Democratic Christian Party	SDKS	3,833	2.66%	0	0	0
Slovenian Craftsmen and Entrepreneurial; Party and Centrum Party	SOPS	3,546	2.46%	0	0	0
Independent Party	SN	2,376	1.65%	0	0	0
DEMOS	DEMOS	2,177	1.51%	0	0	0
Liberal Democratic Party of Slovenia	LDSS	2,121	1.47%	0	0	0
Liberal Party	LS	1,934	1.34%	0	0	0
National Democratic Party and Slovenian Party	ND-SGS	1,676	1.16%	0	0	0
Christian Socialists, DS Forward and Free Party	KS-DS	1,518	1.05%	0	0	0
Slovenian Ecological Movement	SEG	1,155	0.80%	0	0	0
“SMER" Association of Slovenia	SMER	929	0.64%	0	0	0
Republican Association of Slovenia	RZS	753	0.52%	0	0	0
Movement for General Democracy	GOD	643	0.45%	0	0	0
Primorska Association	ZZP	344	0.24%	0	0	0
Valid votes		144,157	100.00%	4	6	10
Rejected votes		12,271	7.84%			
Total polled		156,428	79.19%			
Registered electors		197,539				

The following candidates were elected:

- Constituency seats - Stane Firm (SKD); Davorin Kračun (LDS); Jože Protner (LDS); and Ivan Sisinger (ZL).
- National seats - Jože Jagodnik (ZL); Jožef Kopše (SNS); Tone Partljič (LDS); Franc Potočnik (SLS); Janko Predan (ZS); and Jože Pučnik (SDSS).

Substitutions:

- Davorin Kračun (LDS) forfeited his seat on 25 January 1993 upon being elected to the government and was replaced by Rudi Moge (LDS) on 23 February 1993.
