= Ivan Cankar District =

Coordinates: 46°33′37″N 15°38′59″E

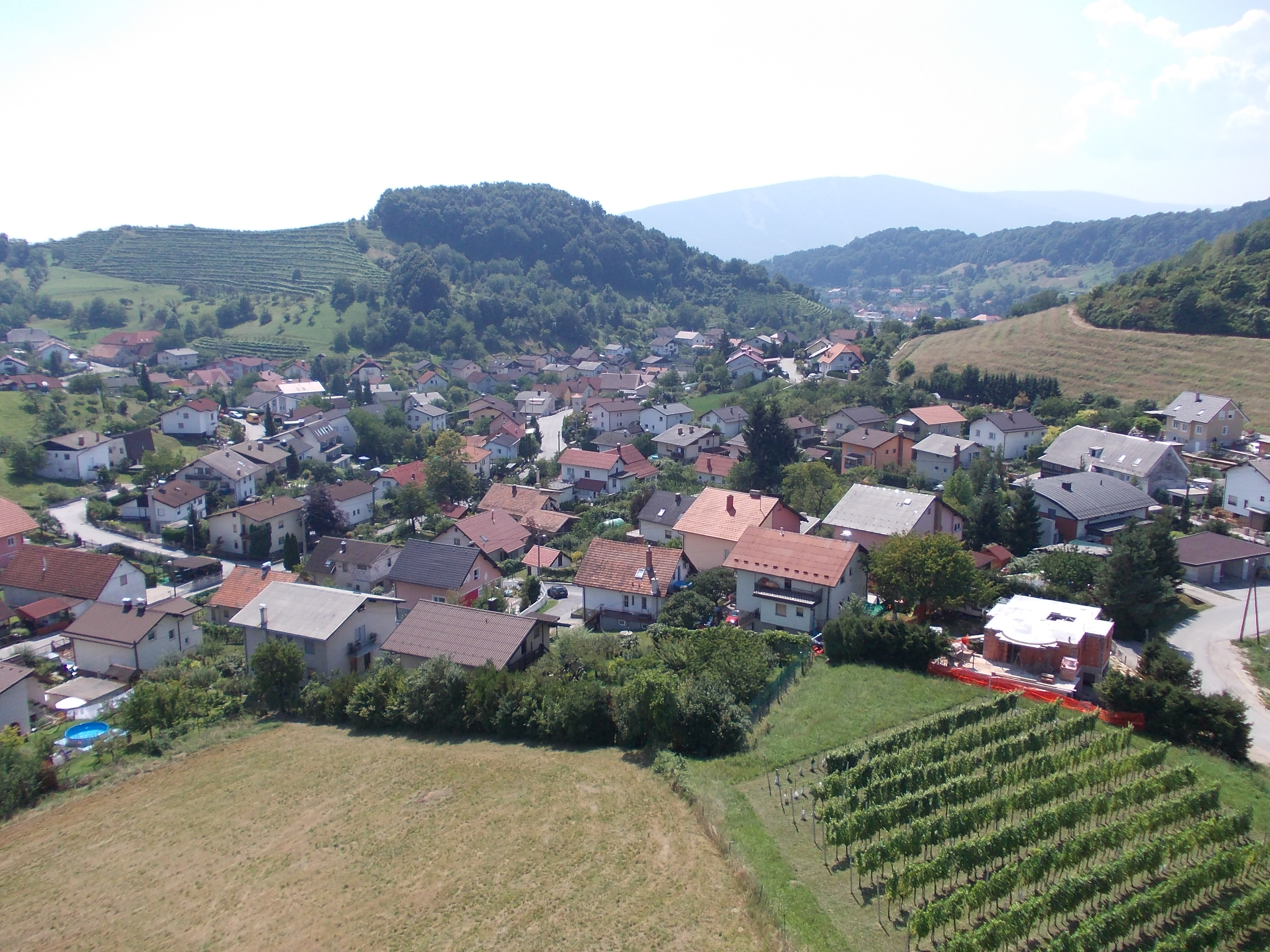
Košaki, a neighbourhood in the Ivan Cankar District

The Ivan Cankar District (pronounced [ˈiːʋan ˈtsaːŋkaɾ]; Slovene: Mestna četrt Ivan Cankar) is a city district of the City Municipality of Maribor in northeastern Slovenia. It is named after Ivan Cankar, one of Slovenia's greatest writers. In 2014, the district had a population of 7,242.
