= Mark an der Drau =

- circa 970s–1482
- A map of the Gau of Zistanesfeld (i.e. Mark an der Drau; red) within the Duchy of Carinthia (pale) at the beginning of the 11th century.
- Status: March
- Government: March
- Margrave
- Historical era: Medieval
  - Established: circa 970s
  - Attached to the Mark an der Mur, forming the Carantanian March: 1147
  - Taken by Hungary: 1254
  - Taken by Ottokar II of Bohemia: 1260
  - Taken by the Habsburgs: 1278
  - Integrated into the Duchy of Styria: 1482
- Today part of: Slovenia (Slovenian Styria)

The Mark an der Drau (German for "March on the (river) Drava") was a historical territory of the Holy Roman Empire and its predecessors during the Middle Ages. It came into being during the second half of the 10th century, covering an area from the eastern border of the Carolingian Carantanian Gaugrafschaft of Jauntal (that is, the Drava valley between the mouth of the Vellach and Schwabegg) to Pettau (modern Ptuj) in the territory of Friedau (Ormož). After 1147 it was attached to the Mark an der Mur forming the March of Styria/Carantania, which later gave rise to the Duchy of Styria. Other designations for the territory include Mark Pettau ('March of Pettau'), Mark hinter dem Drauwald ('March beyond the Drava forest'), Grafschaft hinter dem Drauwald ('County beyond the Drava forest'), Marchia transsilvana/transsylvana, Pitouiensis, and untere Karantaner Mark ('lower Carantanian March').

== Geography ==
The territory of the march corresponded to that of the Gau of Zistanesfeld, which straddled the river Drau (Drava), south of where the Mur approaches it.

The Carinthian County of Jaun (also Jaune, Jaunetal) probably had its eastern border check-point in Hohenmauthen (Muta), beyond which, down the Drava, began the dense Drava forest, which only thinned out again when it reached Marburg (modern Maribor, which first appeared after 1147). In Feistritz (Bistrica pri Rušah, approx. 10 km west of Maribor and which as of 1992 forms part of Bistrica ob Dravi) lay an internal border customs point which is attested from 1093, where it is named as a customs point of the "March of Pettau", an alternative name for the march which is derived from its central settlement Pettau (modern Ptuj).

The course of the Wölka-Tschermenitzen (Slovene: Velka Črmenica) ditches were accepted as the border within the Drava forest itself. The territories west of this line — Mahrenberg (Radlje ob Dravi), Hohenmauthen (Muta), Saldenhofen (Vuzenica) and Windischgraz (Slovenj Gradec) — still belonged in the narrow sense to the Duchy of Carinthia (from 976). In the north the march extended as far as the crest of the Kozjak Mountains, in the east to the river Mur and in the south to the Sann-Drann-watershed. The eastern border with the Kingdom of Hungary was poorly defined; the lordship of Ankenstein (Borl) was an autonomous territory (Allod) until the reign of Maximilian I; Polstrau (Središče ob Dravi) on the other hand was a Hungarian fief of the Prince-Archbishopric of Salzburg until 1803. (Ebner)

== History ==
=== Formation ===
Following the German victory at the Battle of Lechfeld in 955 the Hungarian threat was lifted for the time being, and in the subsequent years (970–980) the Holy Roman Empire was secured through the establishment of a wide belt of border marches against south-eastern threats. These included the March of Austria (contemporarily Marcha orientalis in Latin or Ostarrîchi in Old High German), the Mark an der Mur (the Carantanian march, later the March of Styria), the Mark an der Drau, the Mark an der Sann (which at that time extended far to the south over the Sava river and encompassed the Windic March), and the Marches of Carniola and Istria. The marches of Verona and Friuli had already been integrated into what would become the northern half of the empire by 952.

A count (Graf) named Rachwin was mentioned in 980, in whose Grafschaft (county) a man named Willihalm (father of the later Margrave Wilhelm von der Sann) was granted the later lordship of Weitenstein (Vitanje) by Kaiser Otto II.

In 985 due to the intervention of Duke Henry of Carinthia, Otto III gave count Rachwin 15 Königshufen (a unit of land equivalent to the Scottish and English Oxgang) in Rosswein (Razvanje, south of Maribor). This is probably the same count Rachwin who was named in 980.

Until about 1005 the territory of Aribo, Markgraf im Jaunetal (Margrave in the Jaun valley) was administered by a brother of bishop Albuin of Brixen and member of the Aribonids, and who held large amounts of lucrative property in Bavaria, Salzburg, Carinthia and Styria (namely around Leoben and Straßgang), as well as in the Drava and Sann (Savinja) marches.

=== Church Organisation ===
In the 12th century several parishes in the area around the Patriarchate of Aquileia (south of the Drava, mostly in modern northern Italy) and the Archdiocese of Salzburg (north of the Drava) – "mother parishes" with vicariates and proprietary churches of the nobles — were condensed into Archdeaconates in accordance with Charlemagne's planned 811 division of ecclesiastical territory:

North of the Drava up to Kozjak Mountains, i.e., the area of the Archdiocese of Salzburg, the parishes were assigned to the "Archdeacon of the lower march". The Mahrenberg district alone belonged to the Archdeaconate of Lower Carinthia (and so to Salzburg). Here the boundaries are those of the old political borders between the march and the duchy.
South of the Drava, extending as far as the Sava, was the Archdeaconate of Sanntal (i.e., the Sann valley), which also included Ratschach (Radeče) and Schärfenberg (Svibno) beyond the river. However, the parishes of the Windic March and the Aquileian Saldenhofen district were subordinated to the Archdeaconate of Carinthia. This also covered its eastern border with the political border between the march and the duchy of Carinthia. (Ebner)

=== Sponheimer ===
In 1122 the Spanheim Duke Henry IV of Carinthia transferred the comital title in the Mark hinter dem Drauwald ('March beyond the Drava forest') to his brother Bernhard. At the same time, its Amtsbezirk was expanded up to Unterdrauburg (Dravograd).

=== Traungauer (Otakars) ===
Count Bernhard was married to Kundigunde, daughter of the Styrian Margrave Ottokar II and, upon Bernhard's death in 1147 during the Second Crusade in Laodicia in Asia Minor, all of his allods and ministeriales, as well as the Margravial feudal Amt, fell to Ottokar III of Styria, Ottokar II's son and Kundigunde's brother. This included the lordships of Marburg, Lembach (Limbuš) and Radkersburg, and the ministriales of Marburgm Lembach Haidin and Dranneck or Treun, as well as the Vogtei over the Salzburger lordship of Pettau. With that ended, the march's political dependence on Carinthia. (Ebner)

In 1164 Ottokar III founded the Kartause Seiz from his Spanheim inheritance. (Ebner)

=== Babenbergs ===
At the turn of the 13th century, Hungary took the Friedau district by way of the Salzburger Ministerialis Friedrich von Pettau.

=== Hungary, Bohemia ===
After the extinction of the Babenberg dynasty in 1246, their inheritance, namely Austria and Styria, was naturally of great interest to many rulers. In 1254 the Styrian Drava territory, along with large parts of the rest of Styria, fell to Hungary in the peace of Ofen. However, King Ottokar II of Bohemia subsequently annexed the territory, along with the rest of Styria, following his victory in the battle of Kressenbrunn in 1260. In the battle on the Marchfeld in 1278, in which Ottokar was defeated by Rudolf I of Germany, Ottokar was killed by a Mahrenberger. (Seifried von Mahrenberg, a prominent Styrian noble, had been tortured and killed some years before Ottokar for an invalid claim.) (Reichel)

=== Habsburgs ===
In 1336 the march umb Marchpurg was still mentioned.

In 1362 the territory of Windischgraz (Slovenj Gradec), which had been a possession of the Patriarchate of Aquileia since 1228 (and before that the Counts of Andechs; see Henry II, Margrave of Istria), fell to the Habsburgs, but belonged neither to Styria nor Carinthia. In 1407 it was de facto part of Styria, although it was not de jure Styrian until 1482. (Ebner)
