= Sveti Križ =

Sveti Križ (literally, 'Holy Cross' in Croatian and Slovene) may refer to several places:

In Austria:

- Heiligenkreuz im Lafnitztal, also known as Sveti Križ in Slovene

In Croatia:

- Sveti Križ, Krapina-Zagorje County, a village near Budinščina
- Sveti Križ, Međimurje County, a village near Mala Subotica
- Sveti Križ, Zagreb County, a village near Marija Gorica
- Sveti Križ, Tuhelj, a village in the Municipality of Tuhelj
- Sveti Križ Začretje, a village and municipality

In Slovenia:

- Beli Grič, a settlement in the Municipality of Mokronog–Trebelno, known as Sveti Križ until 1955
- Brnica, Žalec, a settlement in the Municipality of Žalec, known as Sveti Križ until 1953
- Gaj nad Mariborom, a settlement in the Municipality of Maribor, known as Sveti Križ until 1955
- Križevska Vas, Dol pri Ljubljani, a settlement in the Municipality of Dol pri Ljubljani, known as Sveti Križ until 1952
- Planina pod Golico, a settlement in the Municipality of Jesenice, known as Sveti Križ until 1955
- Podbočje, a settlement in the Municipality of Krško, known as Sveti Križ pri Kostanjevici until 1952
- Tlake, Grosuplje, a settlement in the Municipality of Grosuplje, where Zgornje Tlake was formerly known as Sveti Križ
- Vipavski Križ, a settlement in the Municipality of Ajdovščina, known as Sveti Križ until 1955
