= Tatjana Greif =

Slovenian politician (born 1966)

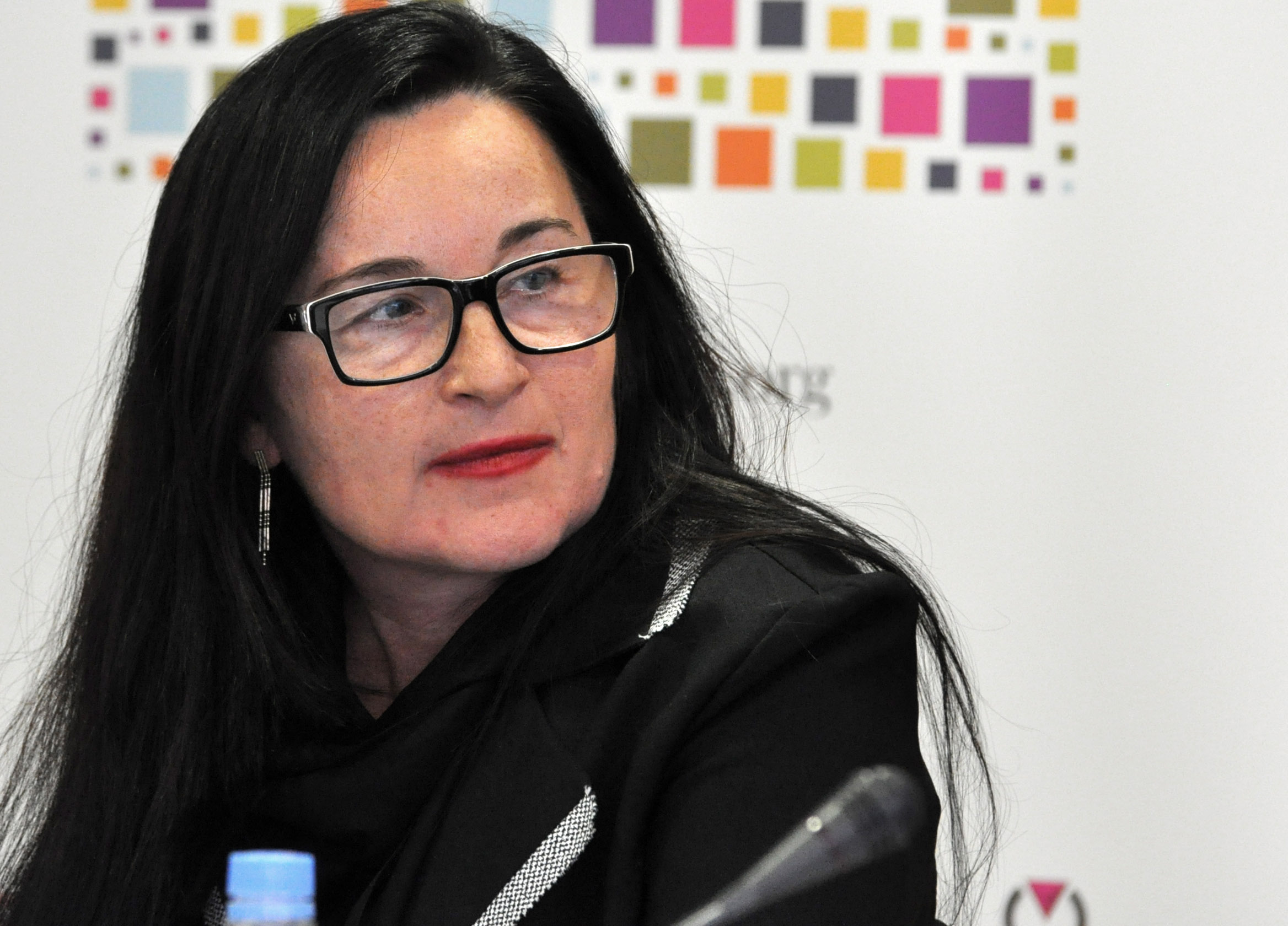
- Greif in February 2015

Member of the National Assembly
- In office 13 May 2022 – 10 April 2026
- Constituency: Maribor – Maribor 4

Personal details
- Born: 3 December 1966 (age 59) Maribor, Yugoslavia
- Party: The Left
- Education: University of Ljubljana

Tatjana Greif (born 3 December 1966) is a Slovenian politician and former member of the National Assembly. A member of The Left, she represented Maribor – Maribor 4 from May 2022 to April 2026.

Greif was born on 3 December 1966 in Maribor. She has bachelor's (1992) and master's (1997) degrees in archaeology from the University of Ljubljana. She also has a doctorate (2005) from the university. She qualified as a librarian from the National and University Library of Slovenia in 1994.

Between 1992 and 1999 Greif was a researcher and head of the library in the University of Ljubljana's Department of Archaeology. She was also on the editorial board of the Arheo journal as well as working for several museums (Ptuj Regional Museum, National Museum of Slovenia, City Museum of Ljubljana, Museo Civico di Storia Naturale di Trieste, Natural History Museum, Vienna and Institut für Pfahlbauforschung Hemmenhofen Bodensee). She held various self employed jobs between 1999 and 2018: editor of the Journal for the Critique of Science, Imagination and New Anthropology (ČKZ) and Delta magazine; programme manager; head of education; and Head of the Assistance to Victims of Discrimination Service at the Student Cultural Center Association (ŠKUC). She was a Fulbright visiting professor at the Northern Arizona University from 2009 to 2010. She was an advisor on culture, national minorities, relations with Slovenes in neighbouring countries and human rights at the National Assembly from 2018 to 2022.

Greif contested the 2014 European Parliament election as a Kacin – Concretely candidate but the list failed to win any seats. She contested the 2022 parliamentary election as The Left's candidate in Maribor – Maribor 4 and received a national seat in the National Assembly. She was a member of the Parliamentary Assembly of the Council of Europe from October 2022 to October 2023.

Greif is an LGBT activist.

== Electoral history ==
Electoral history of Tatjana Greif
Election	Constituency	Electoral district	Party	Votes	%	Result
2014 European Parliament	Slovenia		Kacin – Concretely	153	0.77%	Not elected
2022 parliamentary	Maribor	Maribor 4	The Left	627	7.10%	Elected
