= Rošpoh, Kungota =

Rošpoh
- Location in Slovenia
- Coordinates: 46°36′28.26″N 15°38′23.8″E
- Country: Slovenia
- Traditional region: Styria
- Statistical region: Drava
- Municipality: Kungota

Area
  - Total: 2.28 km^{2} (0.88 sq mi)
- Elevation: 264.2 m (867 ft)

Population (2002)
  - Total: 236

Rošpoh (pronounced [ˈɾoːʃpɔx]; in older sources also Rožpoh, German: Rossbach) is a dispersed settlement in the western Slovene Hills (Slovene: Slovenske gorice) in northeastern Slovenia. The hamlet of Mali Rošpoh in the northern part of the settlement lies in the Municipality of Kungota. The remaining part of the settlement, which the village was split from in 1982, belongs to the municipality of Maribor.

== Name ==
Rošpoh was attested in written sources in 1250 as am Rosspach (and as im Rospach in 1352, am Rosspach again in 1418, and am Rospach in 1445). The name is originally a hydronym that was transferred to the adjacent settlement. It is derived from the Middle High German compound Rosbach (from ros 'horse' + bach 'creek'). In the past the German name was Rossbach.
