= Laznica, Maribor =

Laznica
- Location in Slovenia
- Coordinates: 46°33′28.28″N 15°34′0.62″E
- Country: Slovenia
- Traditional region: Styria
- Statistical region: Drava
- Municipality: Maribor

Area
  - Total: 1.92 km^{2} (0.74 sq mi)
- Elevation: 291.4 m (956 ft)

Population (2021)
  - Total: 313

Laznica (pronounced [ˈlaːznitsa]) is a settlement on the right bank of the Drava River west of Maribor in northeastern Slovenia. It belongs to the City Municipality of Maribor.
