= Košaki =

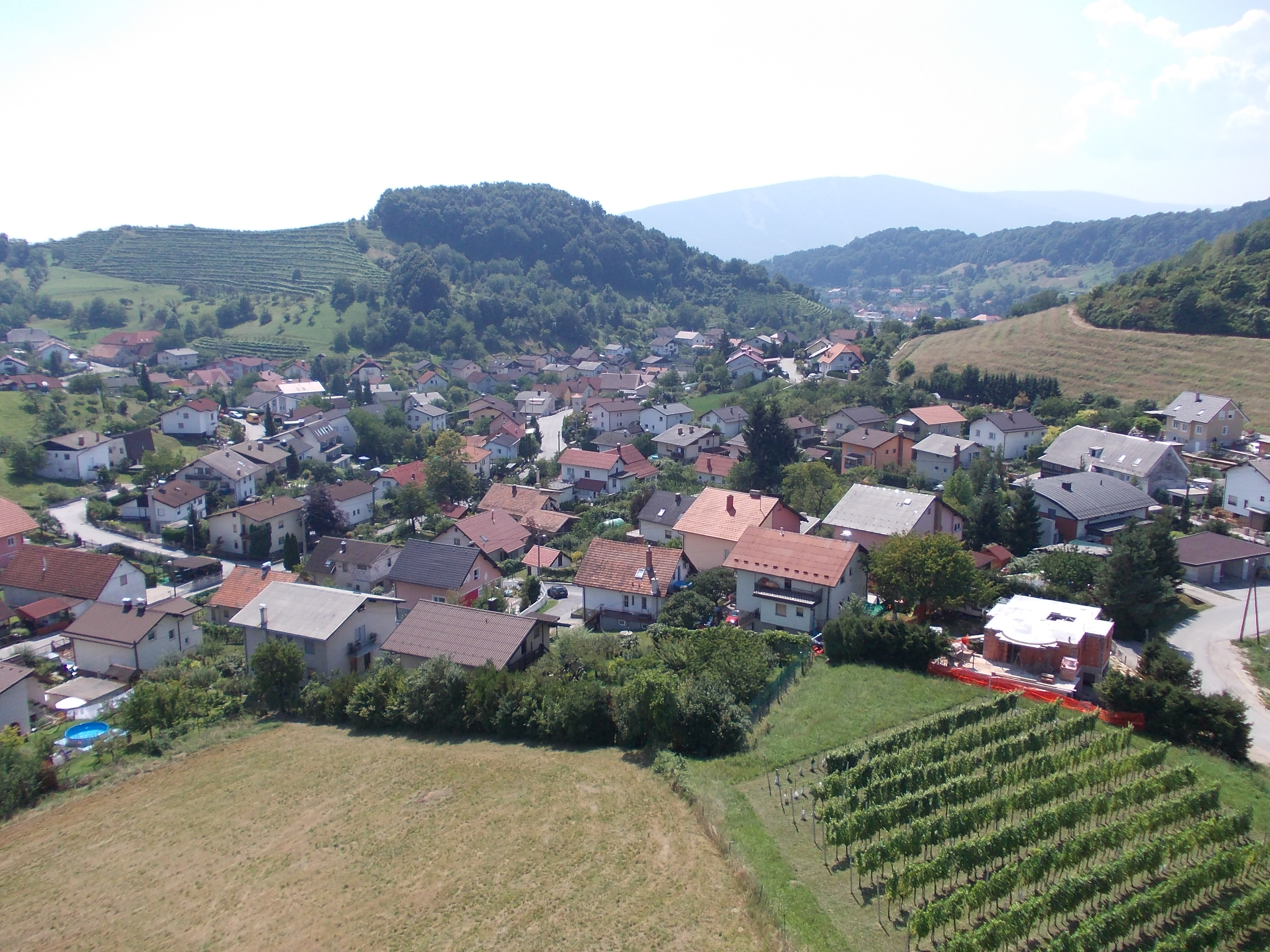

- Location in Slovenia
- Coordinates: 46°34′32.44″N 15°39′54.96″E
- Country: Slovenia
- Traditional region: Styria
- Statistical region: Drava
- Municipality: Maribor

Area
  - Total: 2.11 km^{2} (0.81 sq mi)
- Elevation: 305.1 m (1,001 ft)

Population (2002)
  - Total: 981

Košaki (pronounced [kɔˈʃaːki]) is a former settlement north of Maribor in the City Municipality of Maribor in northeastern Slovenia. Since 2008, it has been part of Maribor.
