= Karmen Furman =

Slovenian politician (born 1980)

Member of the National Assembly
- Incumbent
- Assumed office 22 June 2018
- Constituency: Maribor – Slovenska Bistrica

Personal details
- Born: 17 April 1980 (age 45)
- Party: Slovenian Democratic Party

Karmen Furman (born 17 April 1980) is a Slovenian politician serving as a member of the National Assembly since 2018. She has served as chairwoman of the Slovenian Democratic Party in Slovenska Bistrica since 2017.
