= Vinarje, Maribor =

Vinarje
- Location in Slovenia
- Coordinates: 46°34′51.14″N 15°38′16.55″E
- Country: Slovenia
- Traditional region: Styria
- Statistical region: Drava
- Municipality: Maribor

Area
  - Total: 1.33 km^{2} (0.51 sq mi)
- Elevation: 305.4 m (1,002 ft)

Population (2021)
  - Total: 240

Vinarje (pronounced [ʋiˈnaːɾjɛ]) is a dispersed settlement in the hills north of Maribor in northeastern Slovenia. It belongs to the City Municipality of Maribor.
