= Trčova =

- Location in Slovenia
- Coordinates: 46°32′22″N 15°43′12.85″E
- Country: Slovenia
- Traditional region: Styria
- Statistical region: Drava
- Municipality: Maribor

Area
  - Total: 2.01 km^{2} (0.78 sq mi)
- Elevation: 277.4 m (910 ft)

Population (2021)
  - Total: 783

Trčova (pronounced [təɾˈtʃɔːʋa] or [təɾˈtʃoːʋa], German: Tepsau) is a settlement on the left bank of the Drava River east of Maribor in northeastern Slovenia. It belongs to the City Municipality of Maribor.
