= Ruperče =

- Location in Slovenia
- Coordinates: 46°33′12.97″N 15°44′35.4″E
- Country: Slovenia
- Traditional region: Styria
- Statistical region: Drava
- Municipality: Maribor

Area
  - Total: 3.05 km^{2} (1.18 sq mi)
- Elevation: 337.1 m (1,106 ft)

Population (2021)
  - Total: 397

Ruperče (pronounced [ˈɾuːpɛɾtʃɛ], in older sources Roperce, German: Ruppersbach) is a settlement in the hills east of Maribor in northeastern Slovenia. It belongs to the City Municipality of Maribor.
