= Rošpoh, Maribor =

Rošpoh
- Location in Slovenia
- Coordinates: 46°35′21.11″N 15°37′45.43″E
- Country: Slovenia
- Traditional region: Styria
- Statistical region: Drava
- Municipality: Maribor

Area
  - Total: 7.73 km^{2} (2.98 sq mi)
- Elevation: 369.8 m (1,213 ft)

Population (2021)
  - Total: 857

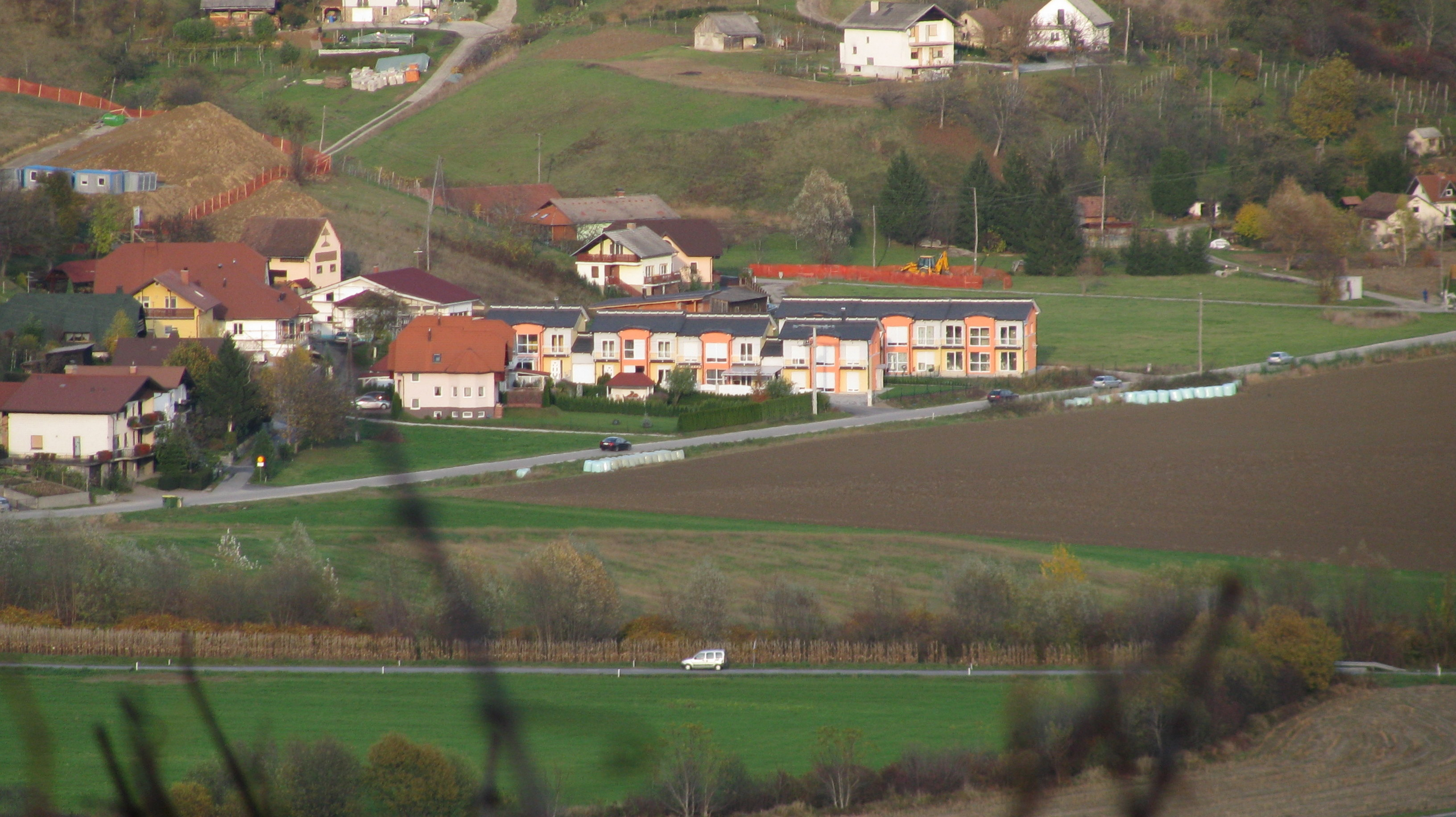

Rošpoh (pronounced [ˈɾoːʃpɔx]; in older sources also Rožpoh, German: Rossbach) is a dispersed settlement north of Maribor in northeastern Slovenia. The largest part of the settlement belongs to the City Municipality of Maribor. The remaining part of the settlement was split from the village in 1982 and now belongs to the Municipality of Kungota.

== Name ==
Rošpoh was attested in written sources in 1250 as am Rosspach (and as im Rospach in 1352, am Rosspach again in 1418, and am Rospach in 1445). The name is originally a hydronym that was transferred to the adjacent settlement. It is derived from the Middle High German compound Rosbach (from ros 'horse' + bach 'creek'). In the past the German name was Rossbach.
