= Hrastje, Maribor =

Hrastje
- Location in Slovenia
- Coordinates: 46°32′26.82″N 15°34′54.94″E
- Country: Slovenia
- Traditional region: Styria
- Statistical region: Drava
- Municipality: Maribor

Area
  - Total: 5.1 km^{2} (2.0 sq mi)
- Elevation: 354.7 m (1,164 ft)

Population (2021)
  - Total: 576

Hrastje (pronounced [ˈxɾaːstjɛ]) is a settlement southwest of Maribor in northeastern Slovenia. It belongs to the City Municipality of Maribor.

== Name ==
The name Hrastje is derived from the Slovene common noun hrast 'oak', referring to the local vegetation.

== Church ==
On the slopes of the Pohorje range, at the highest point of the settlement's territory on a hill overlooking Maribor, lie the ruins of a local church dedicated to Saint Wolfgang (Slovene: sveti Bolfenk). It was built at the end of the 15th century and was disused from 1785 onward. By 1869 it was already a ruin and began to be used as a mountain hut. A small chapel and the belfry have been restored.
