= Nebova =

- Location in Slovenia
- Coordinates: 46°33′27.63″N 15°43′32.03″E
- Country: Slovenia
- Traditional region: Styria
- Statistical region: Drava
- Municipality: Maribor

Area
  - Total: 1.29 km^{2} (0.50 sq mi)
- Elevation: 343.4 m (1,127 ft)

Population (2021)
  - Total: 123

Nebova (pronounced [nɛˈbɔːʋa] or [nɛˈboːʋa], German: Ebenkreuz) is a settlement east of Maribor in northeastern Slovenia. It belongs to the City Municipality of Maribor.
