= Pekre =

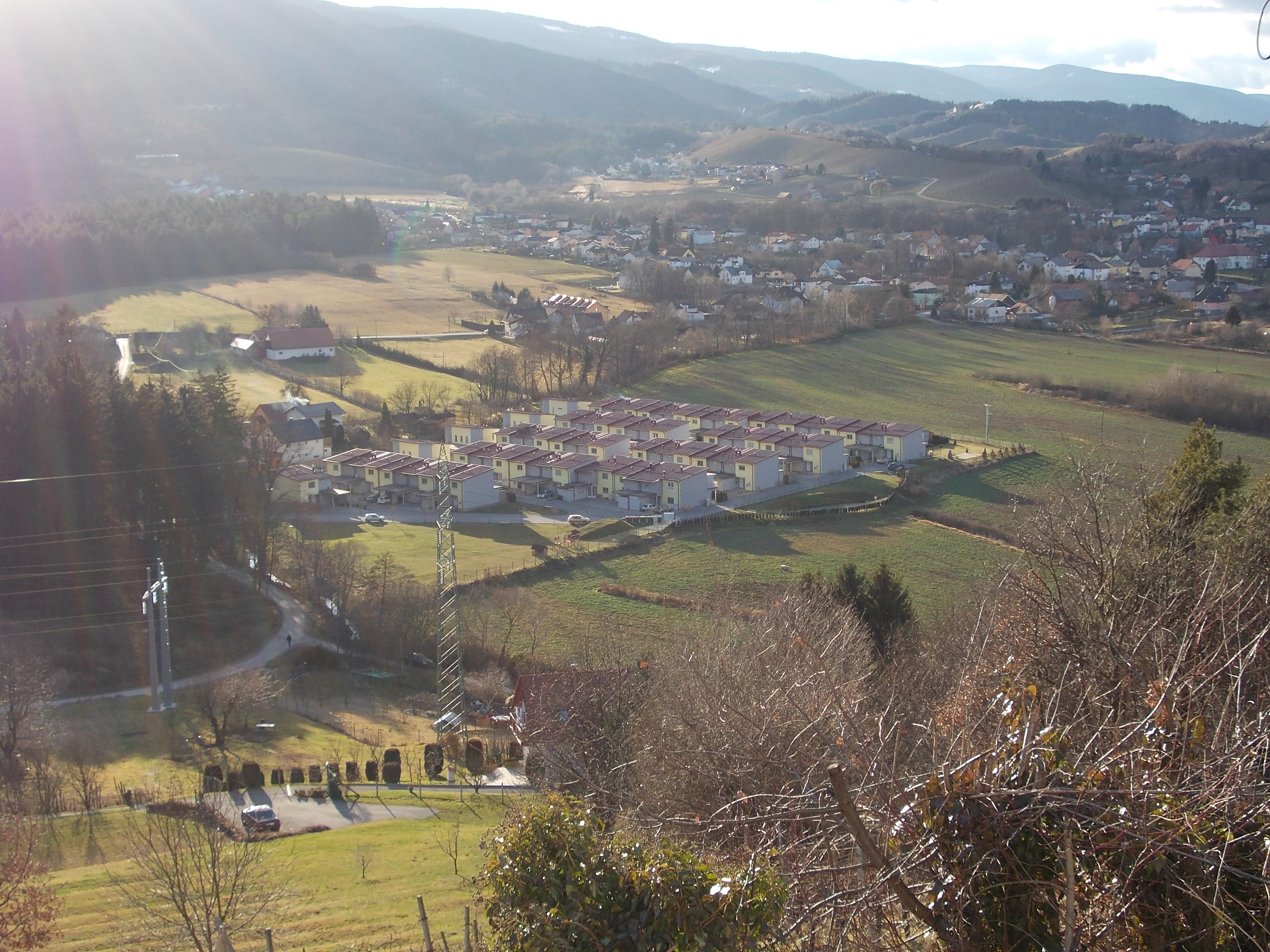

- Location in Slovenia
- Coordinates: 46°32′37.62″N 15°35′30.08″E
- Country: Slovenia
- Traditional region: Styria
- Statistical region: Drava
- Municipality: Maribor

Area
  - Total: 5.1 km^{2} (2.0 sq mi)
- Elevation: 317.9 m (1,043 ft)

Population (2021)
  - Total: 1,464

Pekre (pronounced [ˈpeːkɾɛ]) is a settlement southwest of Maribor in northeastern Slovenia. It belongs to the City Municipality of Maribor.

The local landmark is the church on top of a small hill to the east of the main settlement. It is dedicated to Our Lady of the Seven Sorrows and was built as a pilgrimage church between 1832 and 1835. There are also four small chapel-shrines along the road leading up to the church.

The first military clash between the Yugoslav People's Army and the Slovenian Territorial Defence in Slovenia's war of independence happened in Pekre on 23 May 1991.
