= Grušova =

- Location in Slovenia
- Coordinates: 46°33′16.53″N 15°45′25.03″E
- Country: Slovenia
- Traditional region: Styria
- Statistical region: Drava
- Municipality: Maribor

Area
  - Total: 1.85 km^{2} (0.71 sq mi)
- Elevation: 259 m (850 ft)

Population (2024)
  - Total: 75

Grušova (pronounced [ˈɡɾuːʃɔʋa], German: Gruschau) is a settlement east of Maribor in northeastern Slovenia. It belongs to the City Municipality of Maribor.

There is a small chapel with a belfry in the settlement. It is dedicated to the Holy Cross and was built in the late 19th century with a wooden altar dating to 1760.
