= Vodole =

- Location in Slovenia
- Coordinates: 46°34′12.39″N 15°41′37.57″E
- Country: Slovenia
- Traditional region: Styria
- Statistical region: Drava
- Municipality: Maribor

Area
  - Total: 1.85 km^{2} (0.71 sq mi)
- Elevation: 322.1 m (1,057 ft)

Population (2021)
  - Total: 208

Vodole (pronounced [ʋɔˈdoːlɛ], German: Wadlberg) is a dispersed settlement in the hills northeast of Maribor in northeastern Slovenia. It is a part of the City Municipality of Maribor.

== Name ==
Vodole was attested in written sources as W^{o}dul in 1259 (and as Wodel in 1265–1267 and Wodal in 1295). Like the related name Vodule, the name is derived from the accusative plural of the common noun *ǫdolъ 'small side valley', referring to the local geography.
