= Šober =

- Location in Slovenia
- Coordinates: 46°36′45.47″N 15°34′10.67″E
- Country: Slovenia
- Traditional region: Styria
- Statistical region: Drava
- Municipality: Maribor

Area
  - Total: 12.03 km^{2} (4.64 sq mi)
- Elevation: 478.3 m (1,569 ft)

Population (2021)
  - Total: 238

Šober (pronounced [ˈʃoːbəɾ]) is a dispersed settlement in the hills northwest of Maribor in northeastern Slovenia. It belongs to the City Municipality of Maribor.

The local church, built on a hill above the settlement, is a landmark visible from afar. It is dedicated to Saint Urban and was built in the 16th century. Between 1784 and 1855 it was abandoned, and was then restored in 1860.
