= Vrhov Dol =

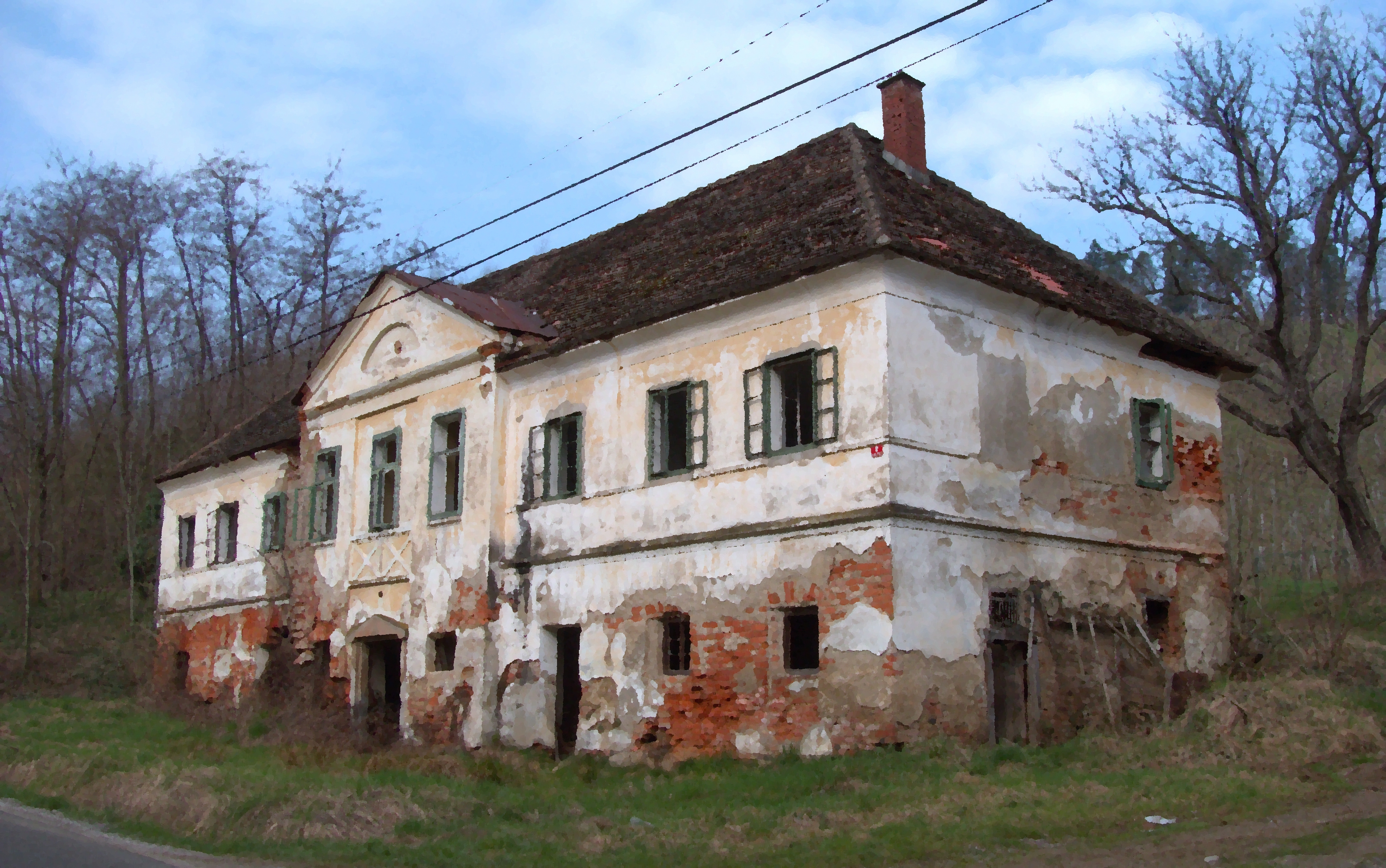

- Location in Slovenia
- Coordinates: 46°32′33.65″N 15°33′37.99″E
- Country: Slovenia
- Traditional region: Styria
- Statistical region: Drava
- Municipality: Maribor

Area
  - Total: 3.36 km^{2} (1.30 sq mi)
- Elevation: 371.6 m (1,219 ft)

Population (2021)
  - Total: 111

Vrhov Dol (pronounced [ˈʋəɾxɔu̯ ˈdoːl]) is a settlement in the foothills of the Pohorje range southwest of Maribor in northeastern Slovenia. It belongs to the City Municipality of Maribor.
