= Celestrina =

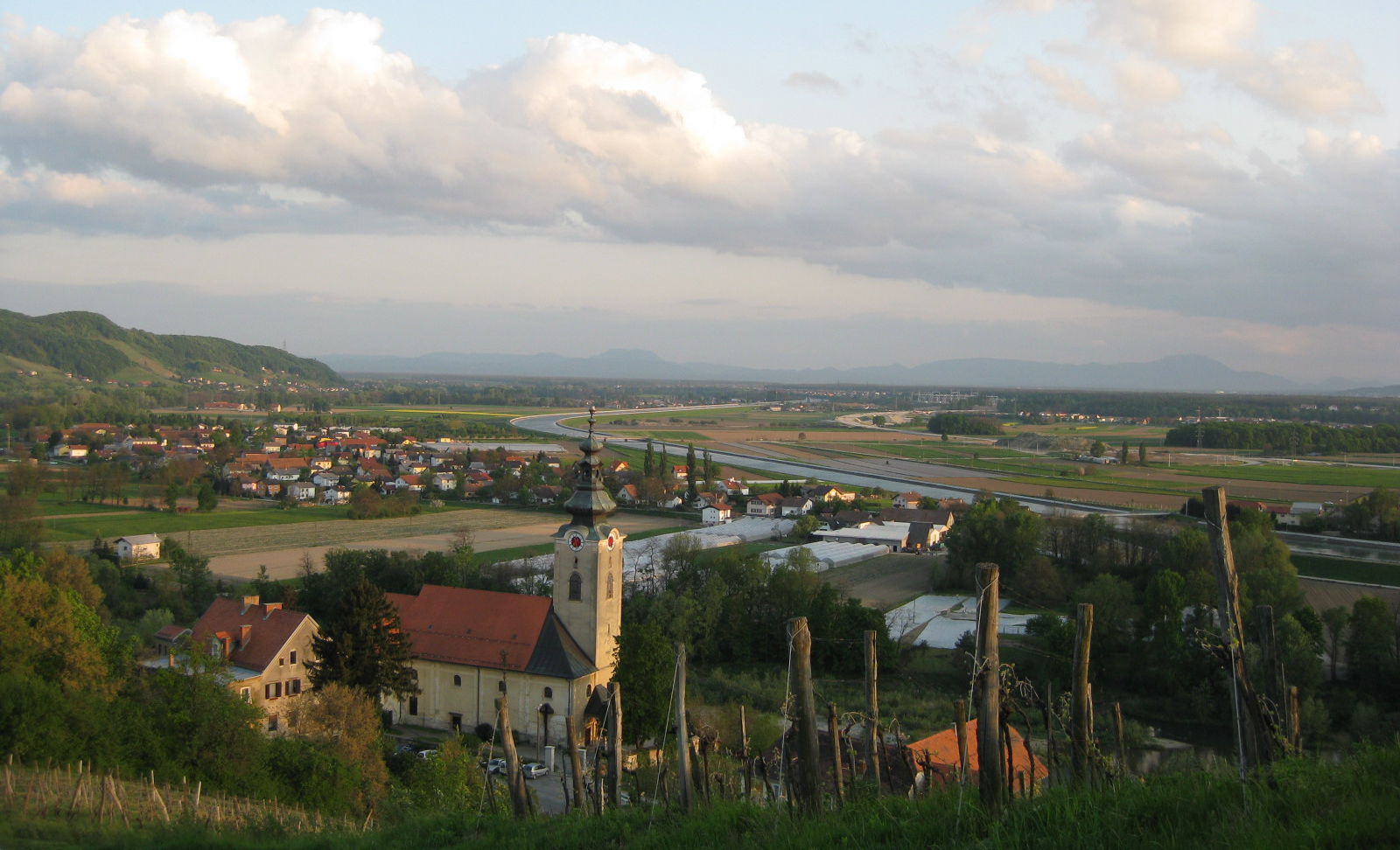

- Location in Slovenia
- Coordinates: 46°33′21.13″N 15°42′43.58″E
- Country: Slovenia
- Traditional region: Styria
- Statistical region: Drava
- Municipality: Maribor

Area
  - Total: 1.27 km^{2} (0.49 sq mi)
- Elevation: 303.7 m (996 ft)

Population (2021)
  - Total: 289
- Climate: Cfb

Celestrina (pronounced [tsɛlɛˈstɾiːna], German: Zellestrin) is a settlement on the left bank of the Drava River in northeastern Slovenia in the City Municipality of Maribor.
