= Zgornji Slemen, Maribor =

Zgornji Slemen
- Location in Slovenia
- Coordinates: 46°36′52.84″N 15°32′14.66″E
- Country: Slovenia
- Traditional region: Styria
- Statistical region: Drava
- Municipality: Maribor

Area
  - Total: 6.29 km^{2} (2.43 sq mi)
- Elevation: 706 m (2,316 ft)

Population (2021)
  - Total: 80

Zgornji Slemen (pronounced [ˈzɡoːɾnji ˈsleːmɛn]) is a dispersed settlement in the hills northwest of Maribor in northeastern Slovenia. The settlement is divided between the City Municipality of Maribor and the Municipality of Selnica ob Dravi.
