= Bresternica =

- Location in Slovenia
- Coordinates: 46°34′11.16″N 15°34′38.64″E
- Country: Slovenia
- Traditional region: Styria
- Statistical region: Drava
- Municipality: Maribor

Area
  - Total: 5.84 km^{2} (2.25 sq mi)
- Elevation: 321 m (1,053 ft)

Population (2021)
  - Total: 1,299
- Climate: Cfb

Bresternica (pronounced [ˈbɾeːstəɾnitsa] or [bɾɛstəɾˈniːtsa]) is a settlement on the left bank of the Drava River in northeastern Slovenia in the City Municipality of Maribor. After the Second World War, a Yugoslav labor camp for political prisoners operated in Bresternica until the end of 1945.
