= Počehova =

- Location in Slovenia
- Coordinates: 46°34′59.58″N 15°39′9.26″E
- Country: Slovenia
- Traditional region: Styria
- Statistical region: Drava
- Municipality: Maribor

Area
  - Total: 1.65 km^{2} (0.64 sq mi)
- Elevation: 295.4 m (969 ft)

Population (2021)
  - Total: 418

Počehova (pronounced [pɔtʃɛˈxɔːʋa] or [pɔtʃɛˈxoːʋa]) is a settlement north of Maribor in northeastern Slovenia. It belongs to the City Municipality of Maribor.
