= Meljski Hrib =

- Location in Slovenia
- Coordinates: 46°33′50.58″N 15°40′12.81″E
- Country: Slovenia
- Traditional region: Styria
- Statistical region: Drava
- Municipality: Maribor

Area
  - Total: 1.52 km^{2} (0.59 sq mi)
- Elevation: 298.2 m (978 ft)

Population (2021)
  - Total: 291

Meljski Hrib (pronounced [ˈmeːlski ˈxɾiːp]) is a settlement on a small hill northeast of Maribor in northeastern Slovenia. It belongs to the City Municipality of Maribor.

Archaeological finds in the area with artifacts dating to prehistory and Roman pot sherds point to the continuous settlement of the area.
