= Ribniško Selo =

- Location in Slovenia
- Coordinates: 46°34′32.26″N 15°38′32.3″E
- Country: Slovenia
- Traditional region: Styria
- Statistical region: Drava
- Municipality: Maribor

Area
  - Total: 0.68 km^{2} (0.26 sq mi)
- Elevation: 309.6 m (1,016 ft)

Population (2021)
  - Total: 310

Ribniško Selo (pronounced [ˈɾiːbniʃkɔ ˈsɛːlɔ]; Slovene: Ribniško selo) is a settlement immediately north of Maribor in northeastern Slovenia. It belongs to the City Municipality of Maribor.

There is a small chapel with a belfry at the end of a small valley northeast of the main settlement. Above the door casing the date of construction is given as 1679.
