= Zrkovci =

- Location in Slovenia
- Coordinates: 46°32′40.73″N 15°42′30.38″E
- Country: Slovenia
- Traditional region: Styria
- Statistical region: Drava
- Municipality: Maribor

Area
  - Total: 3.26 km^{2} (1.26 sq mi)
- Elevation: 247 m (810 ft)

Population (2021)
  - Total: 722

Zrkovci (pronounced [zəɾˈkoːu̯tsi]) is a settlement on the right bank of the Drava River east of Maribor in northeastern Slovenia. It is a suburb of Maribor and belongs to the City Municipality of Maribor.
