= Srednje =

- Village
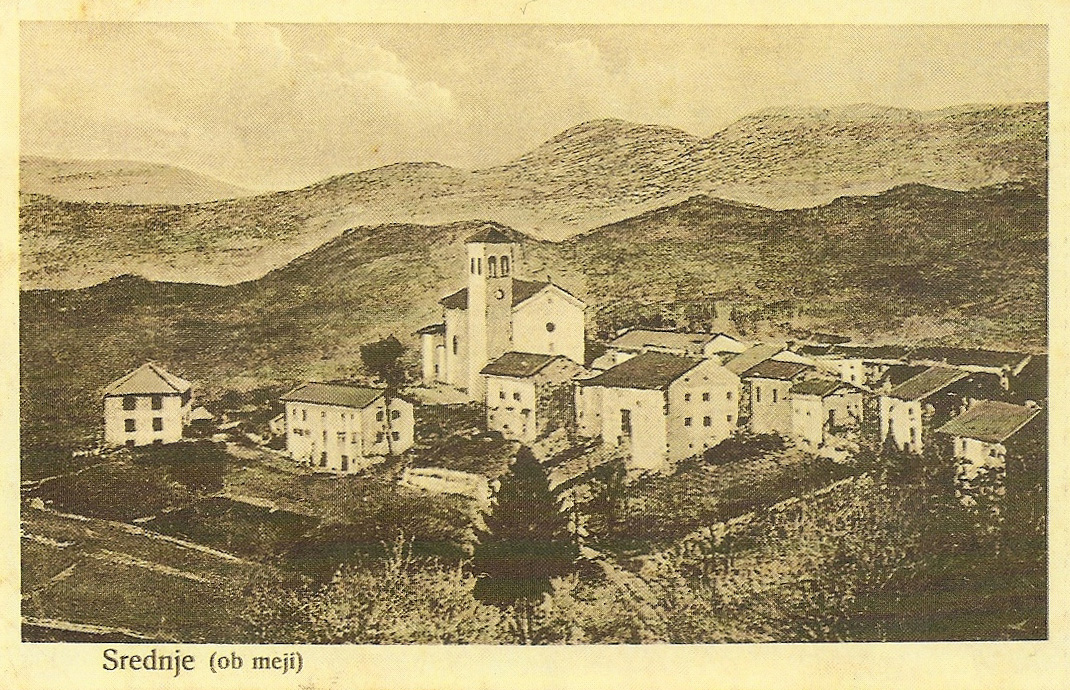
- Postcard depicting Sredenje in 1915

- Location in Slovenia
- Coordinates: 46°34′38.84″N 15°33′3.59″E
- Country: Slovenia
- Traditional region: Styria
- Statistical region: Drava
- Municipality: Maribor

Area
  - Total: 4.2 km^{2} (1.6 sq mi)
- Elevation: 550.2 m (1,805 ft)

Population (2021)
  - Total: 174

Srednje (pronounced [ˈsɾeːdnjɛ], German: Mittelberg) is a settlement in the hills above the left bank of the Drava River west of Maribor in northeastern Slovenia. It belongs to the City Municipality of Maribor.

There is a small chapel-shrine with a belfry on a hill to the north of the main settlement. It was built in 1922.
