= Hrenca =

- Location in Slovenia
- Coordinates: 46°33′52.35″N 15°42′23.33″E
- Country: Slovenia
- Traditional region: Styria
- Statistical region: Drava
- Municipality: Maribor

Area
  - Total: 1.08 km^{2} (0.42 sq mi)
- Elevation: 280.7 m (921 ft)

Population (2021)
  - Total: 156

Hrenca (pronounced [ˈxɾeːntsa], German: Krönich) is a settlement east of Maribor in northeastern Slovenia. It belongs to the City Municipality of Maribor.
