= Kamnica, Maribor =

Kamnica
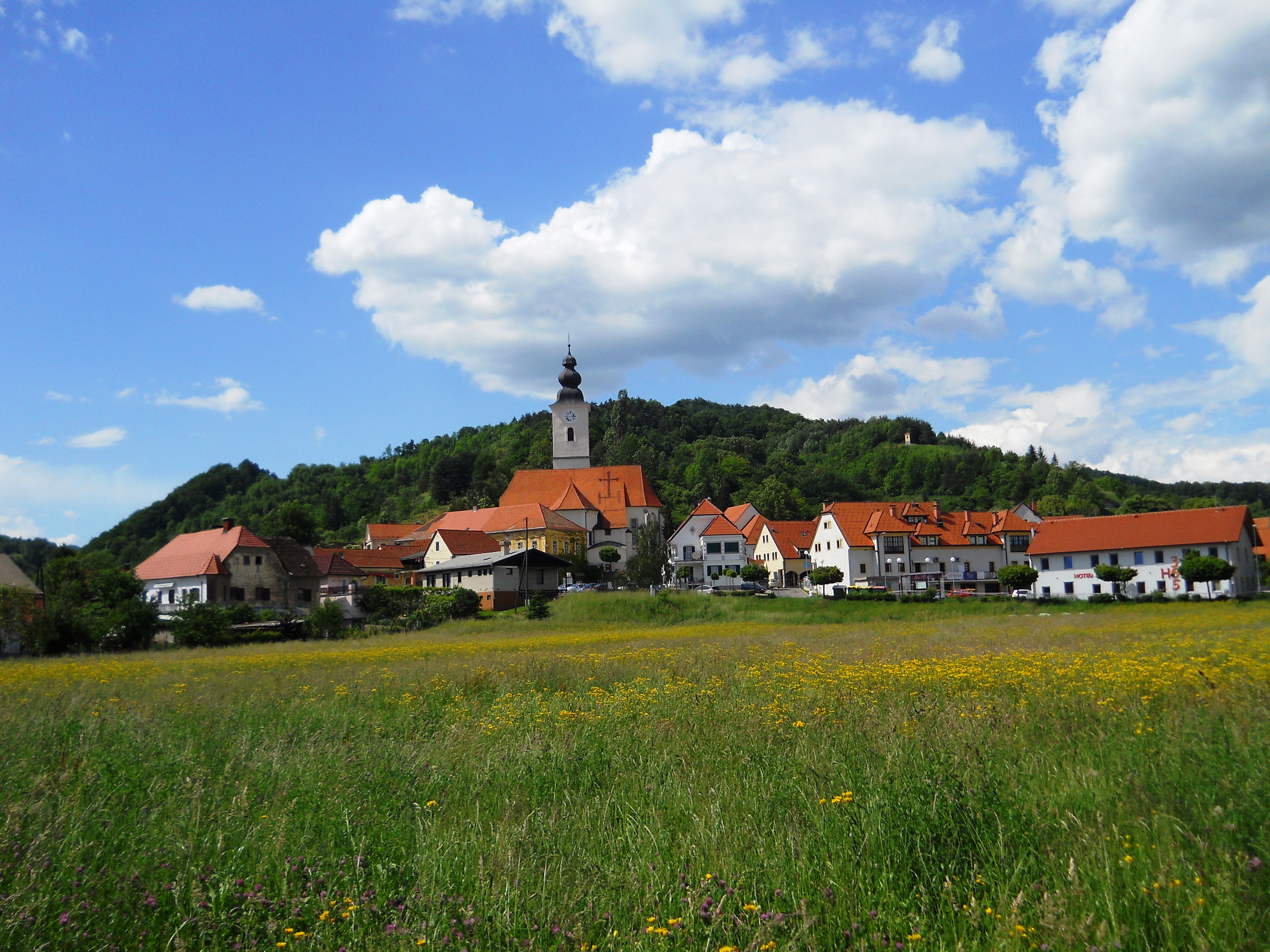

- Location in Slovenia
- Coordinates: 46°34′28.62″N 15°36′48.46″E
- Country: Slovenia
- Traditional region: Styria
- Statistical region: Drava
- Municipality: Maribor

Area
  - Total: 5.41 km^{2} (2.09 sq mi)
- Elevation: 289.4 m (949 ft)

Population (2021)
  - Total: 1,725

Kamnica (pronounced [ˈkaːmnitsa], German: Gams) is a village on the left bank of the Drava River northwest of Maribor in northeastern Slovenia. It belongs to the City Municipality of Maribor.

The local parish church is dedicated to Saint Martin and belongs to the Roman Catholic Archdiocese of Maribor. It is mentioned in written documents dating to the late 11th century. The current building was built at various stages from the 16th to the 18th centuries, with the most recent extensive rebuilding done between 1746 and 1767.
