= Za Kalvarijo =

- Location in Slovenia
- Coordinates: 46°34′17.4″N 15°38′25.55″E
- Country: Slovenia
- Traditional region: Styria
- Statistical region: Drava
- Municipality: Maribor

Area
  - Total: 0.45 km^{2} (0.17 sq mi)
- Elevation: 335.8 m (1,102 ft)

Population (2021)
  - Total: 187

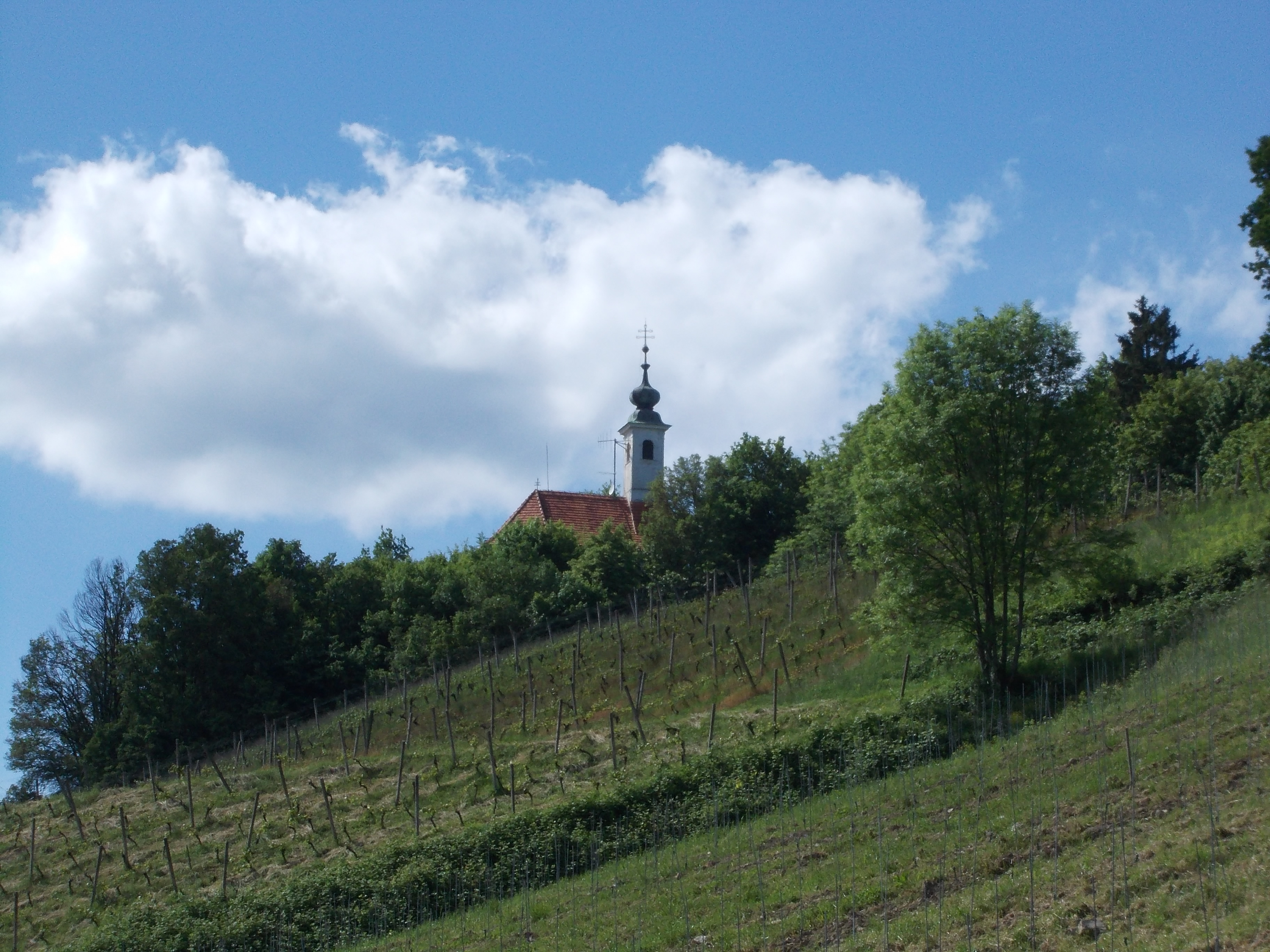
Saint Barbara Church, Za Kalvarijo.

Za Kalvarijo (pronounced [za kalˈʋaːɾijɔ]) is a settlement north of Kalvarija Hill in the City Municipality of Maribor in northeastern Slovenia.
