= Metava =

- Location in Slovenia
- Coordinates: 46°32′11.47″N 15°43′39.93″E
- Country: Slovenia
- Traditional region: Styria
- Statistical region: Drava
- Municipality: Maribor

Area
  - Total: 2.97 km^{2} (1.15 sq mi)
- Elevation: 305.7 m (1,003 ft)

Population (2021)
  - Total: 296

Metava (pronounced [ˈmeːtaʋa] or [ˈmɛːtaʋa], German: Mettau) is a settlement east of Maribor in northeastern Slovenia. It belongs to the City Municipality of Maribor.
