= Jelovec, Maribor =

Jelovec
- Location in Slovenia
- Coordinates: 46°33′57.42″N 15°34′2.33″E
- Country: Slovenia
- Traditional region: Styria
- Statistical region: Drava
- Municipality: Maribor

Area
  - Total: 1.02 km^{2} (0.39 sq mi)
- Elevation: 282.5 m (927 ft)

Population (2021)
  - Total: 342

Jelovec (pronounced [jɛˈlɔːʋəts] or [jɛˈloːʋəts] or [ˈjeːlɔʋəts], German: Jellowetz) is a settlement on the left bank of the Drava River west of Maribor in northeastern Slovenia. It belongs to the City Municipality of Maribor.
