= Gaj nad Mariborom =

Gaj nad Mariborom Sveti Križ (until 1955)
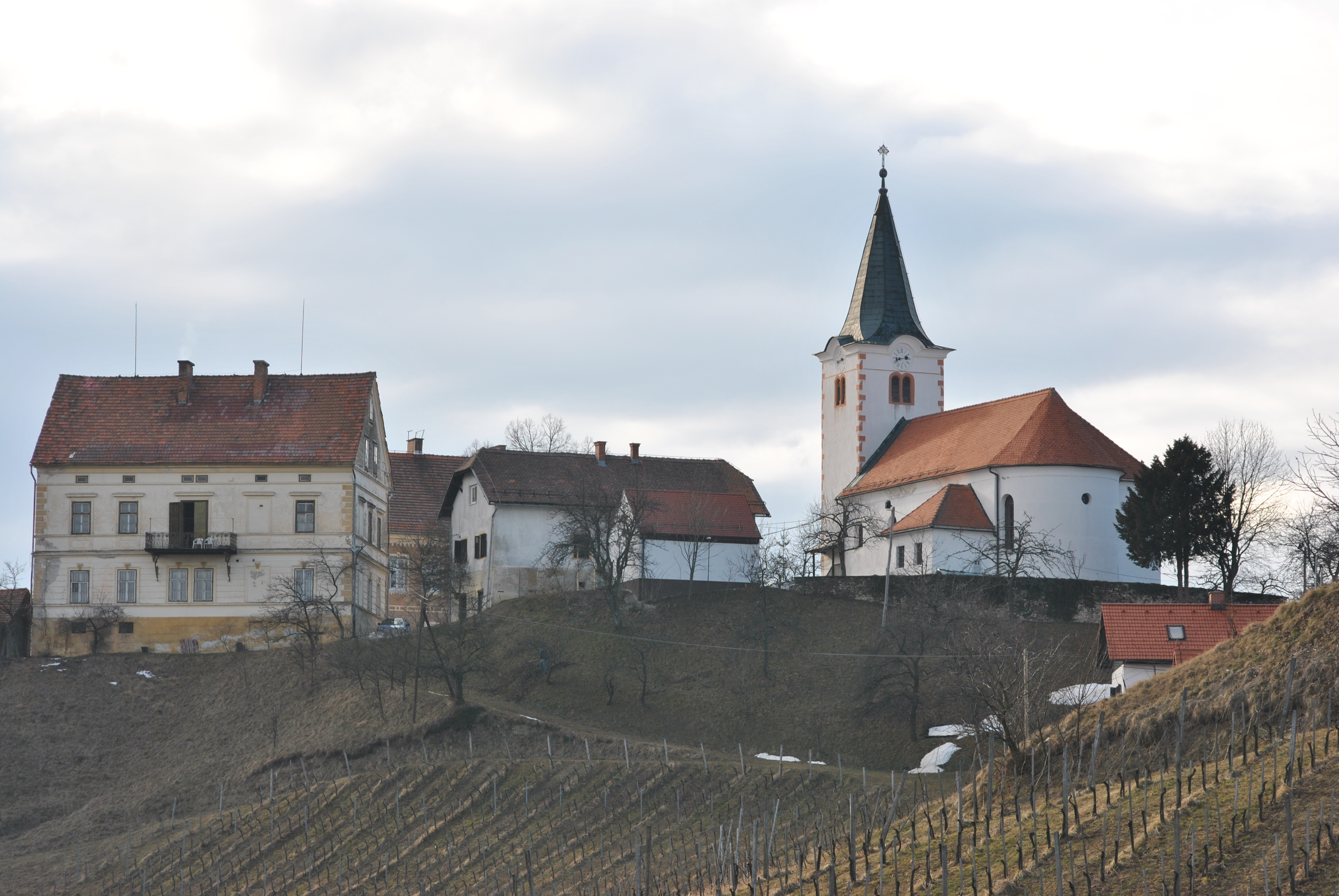

- Location in Slovenia
- Coordinates: 46°37′22″N 15°35′27.73″E
- Country: Slovenia
- Traditional region: Styria
- Statistical region: Drava
- Municipality: Maribor

Area
  - Total: 7.15 km^{2} (2.76 sq mi)
- Elevation: 402.3 m (1,320 ft)

Population (2021)
  - Total: 217

Gaj nad Mariborom (pronounced [ˈɡaːi̯ nat ˈmaːɾibɔɾɔm]; German: Heiligenkreuz) is a settlement in the hills northwest of Maribor in northeastern Slovenia. It belongs to the City Municipality of Maribor.

== Name ==
The name of the settlement was changed from Sveti Križ (literally, 'Holy Cross') to Gaj nad Mariborom (literally, 'grove above Maribor') in 1955. The name was changed on the basis of the 1948 Law on Names of Settlements and Designations of Squares, Streets, and Buildings as part of efforts by Slovenia's postwar communist government to remove religious elements from toponyms. In the past the German name was Heiligenkreuz.

== History ==
A school was established in the rectory in the settlement in 1810. A schoolhouse was built in 1898. Towards the end of the Second World War, the Partisans established positions in the settlement. The Partisans burned the school in 1944, and in 1945 they also burned the inn and rectory. A Partisan base was established at the Tojzl farm in 1944. In May 1945, German forces surrounded the Terbižar farm, where they killed two Partisans and the farm owner, Karl Dobaj.

== Church ==
The parish church in the settlement is dedicated to the Holy Cross and belongs to the Roman Catholic Archdiocese of Maribor. It was first mentioned in written documents dating to 1473. The church was renovated after a fire in 1769, and was extended in 1884. It has Baroque furnishings. The two sculptures on the main altar are works by Veit Königer (1729–1792). The church records date back to 1786. The cemetery chapel is dedicated to John the Evangelist.

== Notable people ==
Notable people that were born or lived in Gaj nad Mariborom include:

- Franc Hauptman (1847–1925), education specialist and textbook author
- Radoslav Pipuš (1864–1928), politician
- Franc Simonič (1803–1866), education activist
- Edo Verdonik (1908–1978), actor, singer, and director
