= Razvanje =

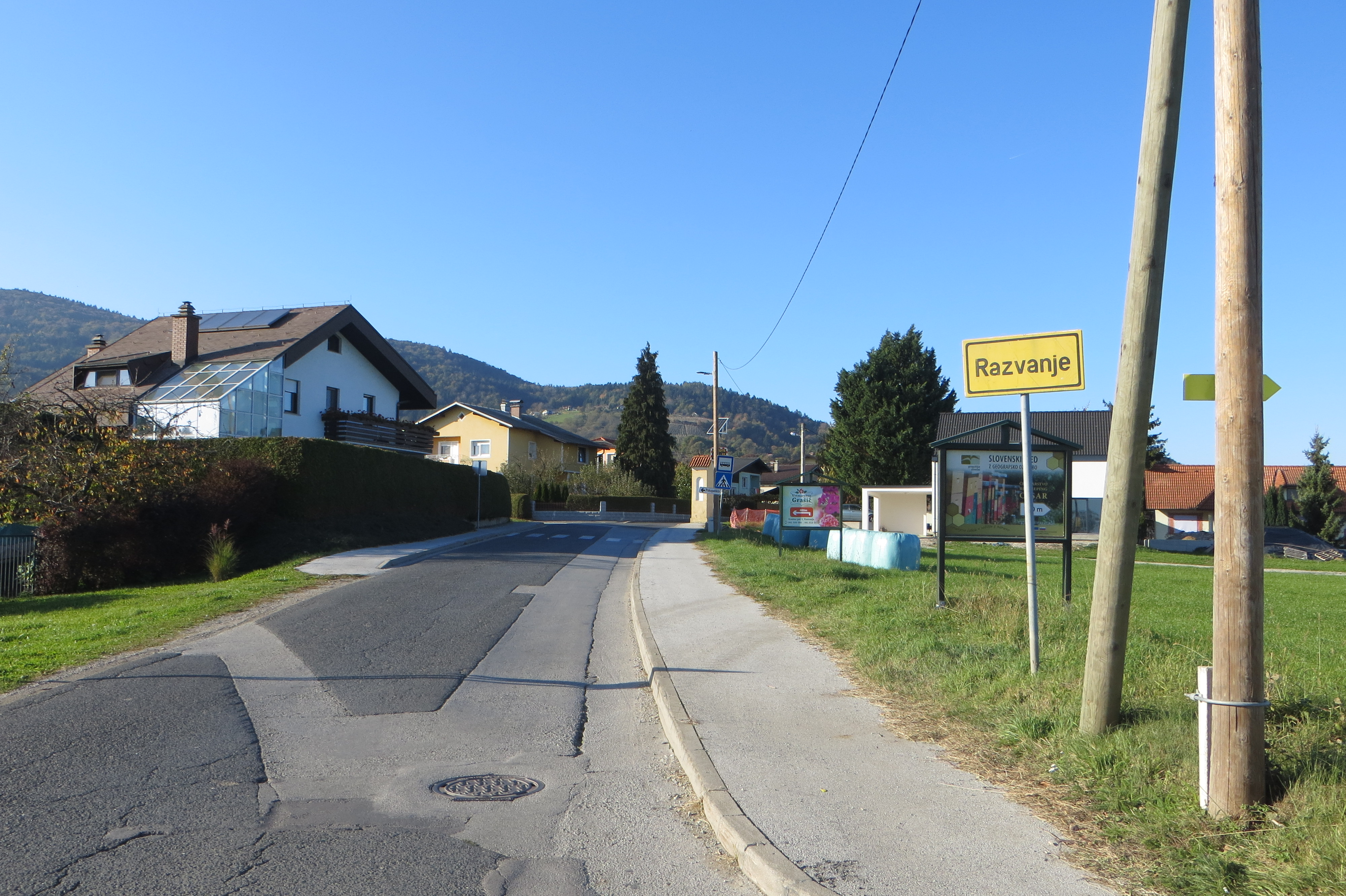

- Location in Slovenia
- Coordinates: 46°30′47.97″N 15°38′3.37″E
- Country: Slovenia
- Traditional region: Styria
- Statistical region: Drava
- Municipality: Maribor

Area
  - Total: 5.49 km^{2} (2.12 sq mi)
- Elevation: 303.2 m (995 ft)

Population (2021)
  - Total: 1,386

Razvanje (pronounced [ˈɾaːzʋanjɛ], in older sources Razvina, German: Roßwein or Rosswein) is a village south of Maribor in northeastern Slovenia. It belongs to the City Municipality of Maribor.

== History ==
Rich archeological sites show that the first people settled here probably at the end of the Neolithic, 4,000 years ago. Remains of stone tools (axes, diggers, hammers, and chisels) and bronze objects (axes, spearheads, and swords) have been found. Due to its strategic location, some tribes from the Razvan area settled on the Pohorje ridge between Razvanje and Rothwein in the 8th century BC. This site, Poštela, was fortified, and on the plain below it cremation burials in clay urns took place until the settlement was destroyed. In the 2nd century BC, Poštela was re-settled by the Celts, who were also the first identified people in the area.

In the Middle Ages, Razvanje belonged to various feudal or ecclesiastical lords of nearby mansions, monasteries, or parishes. Razvanje was first mentioned as Razuuai in 985 in a document in which King Otto III donated 15 royal farms in Razvanje to Count Rachuuin.

The 12th century was characterized by the creation of the manor at Razvanje (German: Rosswein), which was originally owned by St. Paul's Monastery. It then passed through several owners until 1416, when Catherine Fuchsberger sold the manor to the Lords of Ptuj, who annexed the manor to Hompos.

== Church ==
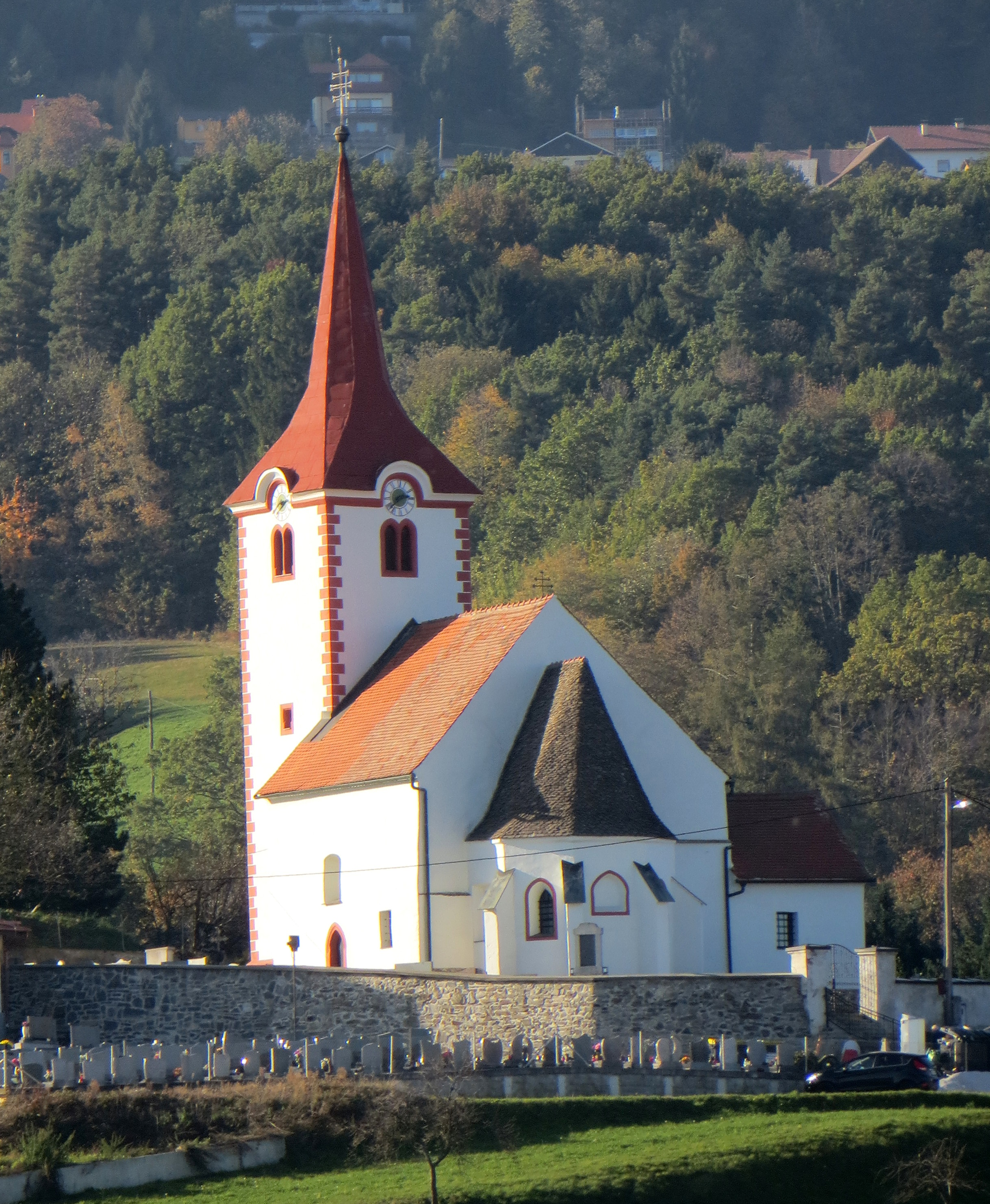
Archangel Michael Church

The local church is dedicated to Archangel Michael and originally dates to the 13th century, but the current building is a combination of an early-16th-century sanctuary and belfry with 18th-century additions. It is the oldest preserved building in the Drava Valley.
