= Limbuš =

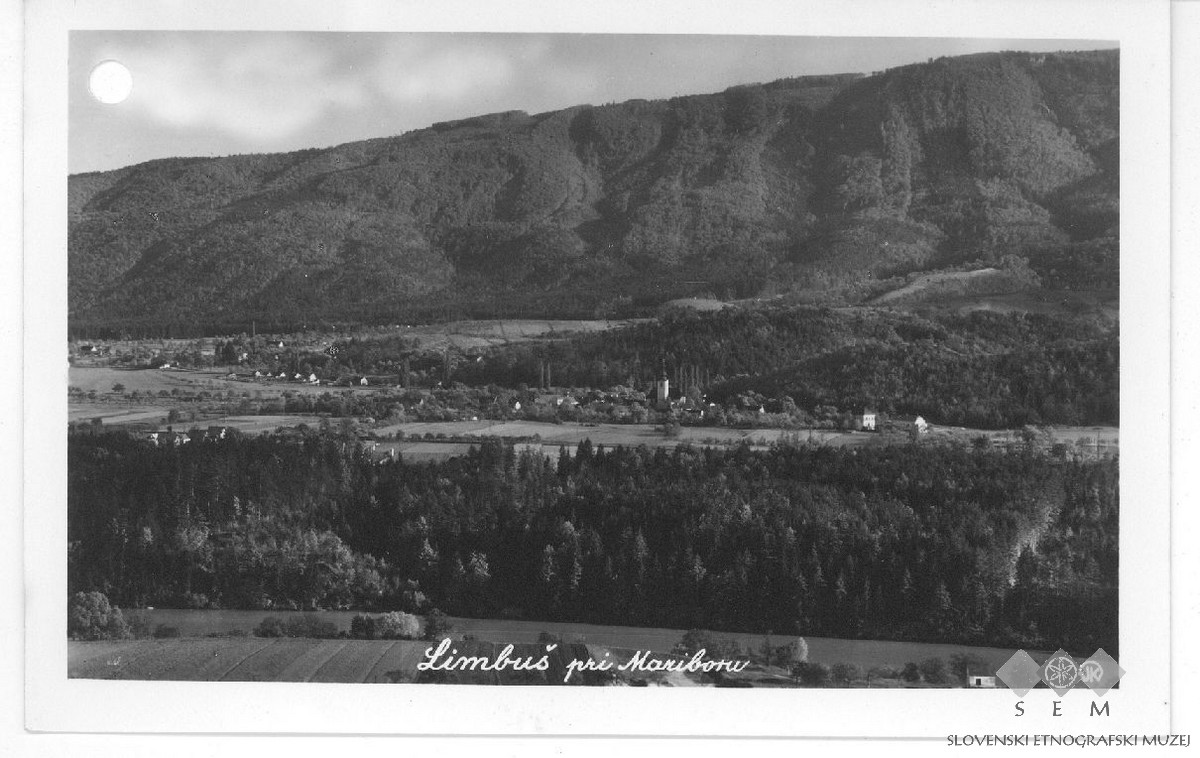
- Postcard of Limbuš

- Location in Slovenia
- Coordinates: 46°33′29.07″N 15°34′43.5″E
- Country: Slovenia
- Traditional region: Styria
- Statistical region: Drava
- Municipality: Maribor

Area
  - Total: 3.69 km^{2} (1.42 sq mi)
- Elevation: 283.5 m (930 ft)

Population (2021)
  - Total: 2,002

Limbuš (pronounced [ˈliːmbuʃ], German: Lembach) is a settlement on the right bank of the Drava River west of Maribor in northeastern Slovenia. It belongs to the City Municipality of Maribor.

The local parish church is dedicated to Saint James and belongs to the Roman Catholic Archdiocese of Maribor. It has a Gothic nave dating to the 15th century, a 16th-century belfry, 17th-century chapels, and a sanctuary with 17th- and 18th-century internal furnishings. There is a walled cemetery around the church.

Limbuš Rado Robič Primary School (Slovene: Osnovna Šola Rada Robiča Limbuš) is named after Radivoj Robič (1919–1944), a Partisan machine-gunner. There is a pharmacy in Limbuš.
