= Urban Municipality of Maribor =

Urban municipality of Slovenia

Urban Municipality of Maribor Mestna občina Maribor
- City Municipality
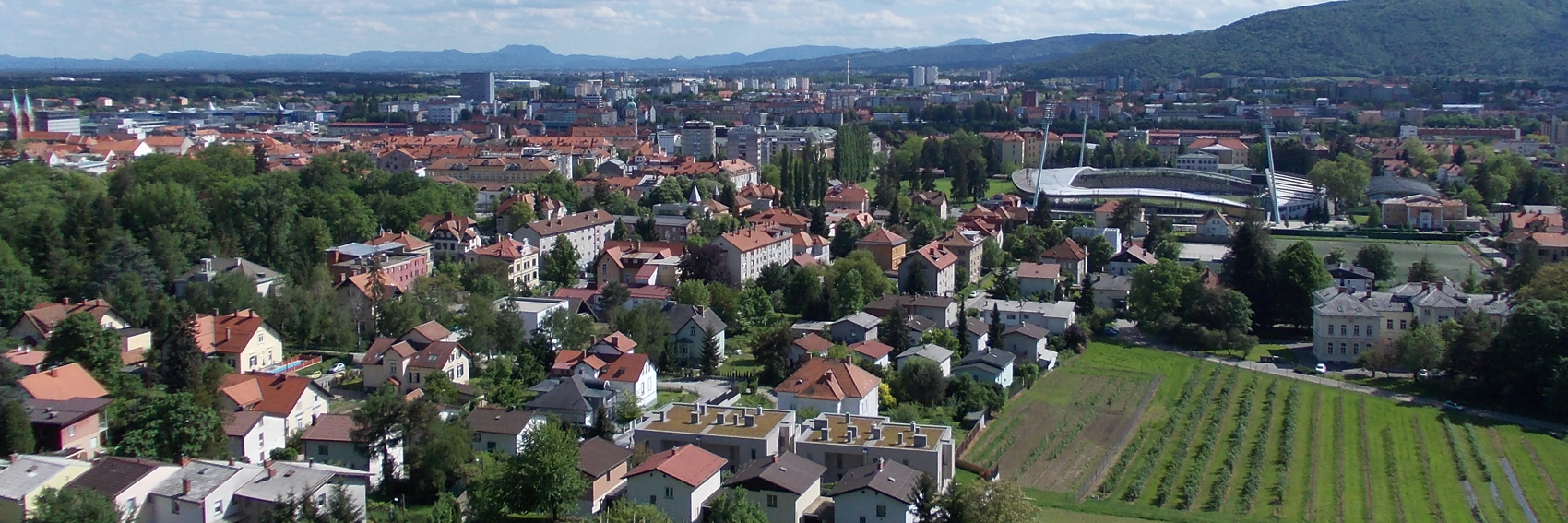

- Coat of arms

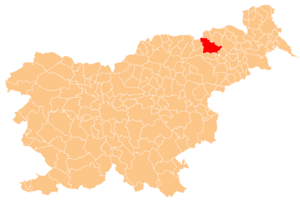
- Location of the Urban Municipality of Maribor in Slovenia
- Coordinates: 46°34′N 15°38′E
- Country: Slovenia

Government
  - Mayor: Saša Arsenovič (Independent)

Area
  - Total: 148 km^{2} (57 sq mi)

Population (2025)
  - Total: 114,301
- Time zone: UTC+01 (CET)
  - Summer (DST): UTC+02 (CEST)
- Website: www.maribor.si

The Urban Municipality of Maribor (pronounced [ˈmaːɾibɔɾ]), also the City of Maribor (Slovene: Mestna občina Maribor, acronym MOM), is one of twelve urban municipalities in Slovenia. Its seat is Maribor, the second-largest city in Slovenia. The population of the municipality was 114,301 in 2025.

Historical population
Year	Pop.	±%
1948	74,456	—
1953	83,271	+11.8%
1961	96,376	+15.7%
1971	111,304	+15.5%
1981	121,245	+8.9%
1991	119,828	−1.2%
2002	110,668	−7.6%
2011	111,730	+1.0%
2021	113,778	+1.8%
Source: SURS

It borders Austria.

== Settlements ==
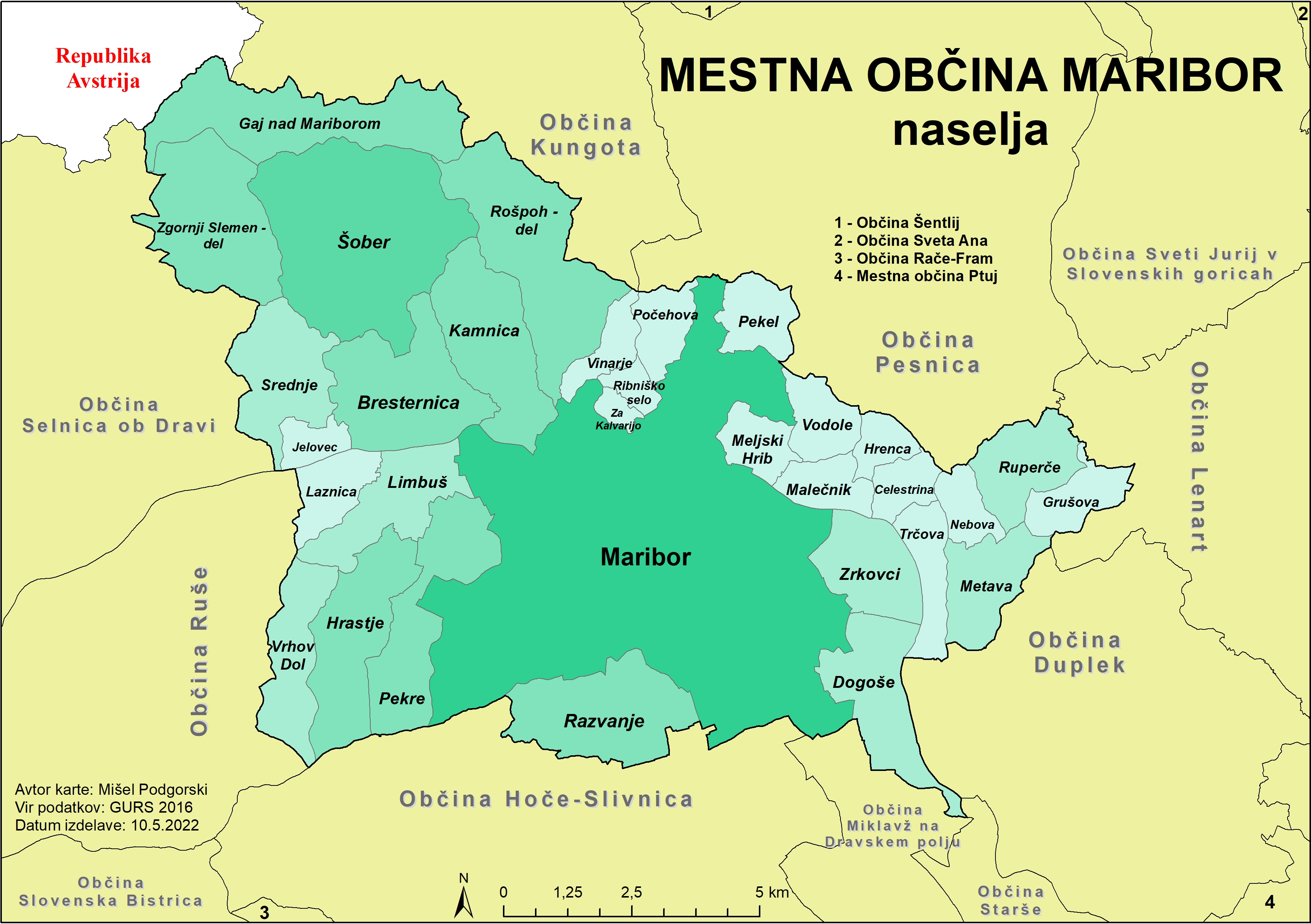
Settlements in the Urban Municipality of Maribor

In addition to the municipal seat of Maribor, the municipality also includes the following settlements:

1. Bresternica
2. Celestrina
3. Dogoše
4. Gaj nad Mariborom
5. Grušova
6. Hrastje
7. Hrenca
8. Jelovec
9. Kamnica
10. Laznica
11. Limbuš
12. Malečnik
13. Meljski Hrib
14. Metava
15. Nebova
16. Pekel
17. Pekre
18. Počehova
19. Razvanje
20. Ribniško Selo
21. Rošpoh – part
22. Ruperče
23. Šober
24. Srednje
25. Trčova
26. Vinarje
27. Vodole
28. Vrhov Dol
29. Za Kalvarijo
30. Zgornji Slemen – part
31. Zrkovci
