= Opinion polling for the 2022 Slovenian parliamentary election =

In the run up to the 2022 Slovenian parliamentary election, various organizations carried out opinion polling to gauge voting intention in Slovenia. Results of such polls are displayed in this article.

The date range for these opinion polls are from the 2018 Slovenian parliamentary election, held on 3 June, to the present day. The next parliamentary election was held on 24 April 2022.

== Pollsters ==
There are three opinion research companies that conduct electoral opinion polling on a regular basis within Slovenia:

- Mediana, separately conducting electoral public opinion polls for the Slovene daily newspaper Delo, and the Slovene television channel POP TV and its respective multimedia web portal 24ur.com;
- Ninamedia, jointly published by the Slovene daily newspapers Dnevnik and Večer;
- Parsifal SC, which conducts opinion polling for the conservative news media enterprise Nova24TV.

== Graphical summary ==
The trendlines below are constructed using local regressions. The graph shows percentages of decided voters (whereas the list of polls shows percentages of all respondents).

== Poll results ==
Poll results are listed in the table in reverse chronological order, showing the most recent first. The highest figure in each survey is displayed in bold, and the background shaded in the leading party's colour. In the case of a tie, no figure is shaded. When available, seat projections for 88 out of 90 seats (without seats reserved for minorities) are displayed below the percentages in a smaller font. 46 seats are required for an absolute majority in the National Assembly. The dates of when the poll was conducted are given when available, otherwise, the date of publication is listed.

=== 2022 ===
Exit poll

Date(s) conducted	Pollster	Client	Sample size	SDS	LMŠ	SD	POS	Levica	NSi	SAB	DeSUS	SNS	PIR	NP-DD	ND	GS	Vesna	RES	ZD	Others	Und.	Lead	Source		
24 April	Election results		1,168,542	23.5	3.7	6.7	3.4	4.4	6.9	2.6	0.7	1.5	1.6	1.7	1.5	34.5	1.4	2.9	1.8	1.4 (Note: 0.7 - For the People of Slovenia 0.4 - List of Boris Popovič 0.2 - Homeland League 0.1 - Let's Liberate Slovenia)	—	11.0			
24 April	Election results		24 Apr	Mediana	RTVSLO	15,216	22.5	3.8	6.6	3.2	4.4	6.8	2.9	0.5	1.6	1.6	1.6	1.8	**35.8**	1.4	2.6	1.5	1.3 (Note: 0.6 - For the People of Slovenia 0.5 - List of Boris Popovič 0.2 - Homeland League)	–	12.3
20–22 Apr	Ninamedia	Dnevnik, Večer	900	23.5	4.2	7.9	3.5	6.9	6.7	3.9	0.7	1.5	2.5	1.2	1.7	**27.1**	2.3	2.9	0.5	0.9 (Note: 0.4 - For the People of Slovenia 0.2 - Alliance Let us Liberate Slovenia 0.1 - List of Boris Popovič 0.1 - Homeland League)	2.2	3.6			
21 Apr (Note: Publication date)	Odmev	—N/a	400	**20.3**	3.5	9.0	3.8	6.0	8.8	2.8	1.5	1.5	2.0	–	2.0	19.3	–	2.5	–	4.0	13.3	1.0			
19–21 Apr	Parsifal	Nova24TV	696	**19.4**	2.6	5.2	2.9	4.0	4.6	1.7	0.7	1.5	1.4	0.6	1.5	18.5	1.1	1.9	0.4	1.6 (Note: 0.4 - Alliance Let us Liberate Slovenia 0.3 - For the People of Slovenia 0.3 - List of Boris Popovič 0.2 - Homeland League)	30.5	0.9			
19–21 Apr	Mediana	Delo, POPTV	1,031	22.7	2.5	7.3	2.9	7.2	7.2	5.2	1.1	–	2.9	1.0	1.3	**24.2**	0.9	2.8	1.4	0.3	6.8	1.5			
19–21 Apr	Ninamedia	Dnevnik, Večer	900	23.6	3.8	7.6	3.1	7.4	6.7	3.8	0.6	1.0	2.4	2.1	1.9	**25.7**	1.9	2.9	0.5	1.1 (Note: 0.6 - For the People of Slovenia 0.3 - Alliance Let us Liberate Slovenia 0.1 - List of Boris Popovič 0.1 - Homeland League)	3.9	2.1			
16–20 Apr	Ninamedia	Dnevnik, Večer	900	22.3	3.5	7.6	4.3	7.2	7.0	3.3	0.9	1.1	2.1	1.9	1.5	**24.7**	1.6	2.9	0.7	1.4 (Note: 0.8 - For the People of Slovenia 0.3 - Alliance Let us Liberate Slovenia 0.2 - List of Boris Popovič 0.1 - Homeland League)	6.0	2.4			
15–19 Apr	Ninamedia	Dnevnik, Večer	900	23.1	3.1	7.8	4.2	7.7	7.3	3.0	0.5	0.8	1.2	1.3	1.0	**23.5**	1.2	2.6	0.9	1.1 (Note: 0.7 - For the People of Slovenia 0.2 - List of Boris Popovič 0.1 - Homeland League 0.1 - Alliance Let us Liberate Slovenia)	9.7	0.4			
14–19 Apr	Parsifal	Nova24TV	714	**21.7**	3.7	5.5	3.7	2.7	4.9	1.8	0.9	1.0	1.1	0.5	2.0	21.1	1.3	1.4	0.3	0.6 (Note: 0.1 - For the People of Slovenia 0.1 - List of Boris Popovič 0.1 - Alliance Let us Liberate Slovenia)	25.8	0.6			
14–16 Apr	Ninamedia	Dnevnik, Večer	750	23.4	3.0	7.9	3.7	8.1	7.1	3.1	0.8	0.7	1.6	0.5	1.2	**24.1**	1.6	2.6	0.9	1.3 (Note: 0.4 - For the People of Slovenia 0.4 - Homeland League 0.4 - List of Boris Popovič 0.1 - Alliance Let us Liberate Slovenia)	8.3	0.7			
13–15 Apr	Parsifal	Nova24TV	658	19.4	3.4	6.5	3.0	3.4	5.4	1.0	1.2	1.1	1.7	0.9	2.3	**20.0**	1.1	2.0	–	0.5 (Note: 0.1 - Homeland League)	27.2	0.6			
13–15 Apr	Ninamedia	Dnevnik, Večer	600	23.1	3.6	7.9	3.2	8.0	6.7	3.3	0.2	0.6	0.4	0.2	1.5	**24.5**	1.4	1.9	0.8	1.0 (Note: 0.4 - Homeland League 0.3 - For the People of Slovenia 0.2 - List of Boris Popovič 0.1 - Alliance Let us Liberate Slovenia)	11.6	1.4			
14 Apr	Odmev	—N/a	700	**15.9**	3.0	8.9	3.0	5.1	7.1	2.1	0.9	3.0	1.6	–	1.3	14.6	–	2.0	–	2.4	29.1	1.3			
12–14 Apr	Ninamedia	Dnevnik, Večer	450	22.2	3.6	8.2	3.2	8.2	6.6	2.9	0.4	1.5	1.2	0.6	1.5	**24.2**	1.3	2.7	0.9	1.7 (Note: 0.7 - For the People of Slovenia 0.6 - Homeland League 0.3 - List of Boris Popovič 0.1 - Alliance Let us Liberate Slovenia)	9.1	2.0			
12-14 Apr	Parsifal	Nova24TV	793	**18.0**	3.7	6.9	3.1	5.3	5.3	1.3	1.7	1.6	1.8	1.1	2.3	17.1	1.2	2.9	-	0.3	26.3	0.9			
11–13 Apr	Ninamedia	Dnevnik, Večer	450	22.3	3.9	8.7	3.7	8.8	6.6	2.8	0.4	1.4	1.4	0.7	1.3	**24.4**	1.1	1.8	0.9	1.4 (Note: 0.5 - For the People of Slovenia 0.5 - Homeland League 0.2 - Alliance Let us Liberate Slovenia 0.2 - List of Boris Popovič)	8.4	2.1			
11-13 Apr	Parsifal	Nova24TV	936	**19.1**	2.4	8.0	4.2	5.8	5.7	1.9	1.5	1.8	1.3	0.7	2.3	15.7	1.0	3.3	-	0.7	24.5	3.4			
4–7 Apr	Ninamedia	Dnevnik, Večer	1,050	18.1	4.8	8.3	2.8	10.1	3.9	3.2	0.3	1.2	1.0	0.8	1.5	**23.0**	1.1	2.2	1.1	1.0 (Note: 0.5 - For the People of Slovenia 0.2 - Let's Liberate Slovenia 0.2 - Homeland League 0.1 - List of Boris Popovič)	15.5	4.9			
4–7 Apr	Mediana	Delo, POPTV	1,027	18.6	4.6	7.9	2.8	5.8	5.5	2.9	0.9	2.3	2.4	1.2	2.4	**19.8**	0.9	1.7	–	1.1 (Note: 0.2 - Let's Liberate Slovenia 0.1 - Homeland League)	19.4	1.3			
4–6 Apr	Parsifal	Nova24TV	532	**20.1**	2.9	8.0	3.3	3.4	4.7	2.4	0.7	1.8	1.0	1.3	2.0	18.6	0.7	2.2	–	0.5	26.2	1.5			
30 Mar–1 Apr	Parsifal	Nova24TV	556	**34.4**	2.2	8.8	6.0	6.0	4.9	3.8	2.8	1.4	2.0	0.4	3.1	21.3	0.7	1.5	–	—N/a	–	13.1			
30–31 Mar	Mediana	RTVSLO	1,025	18.7	3.3	8.2	3.7	6.4	5.0	2.8	1.1	3.3	1.3	1.1	1.9	**19.7**	1.0	1.7	–	0.5 (Note: 0.4 - Let's Liberate Slovenia 0.1 - Homeland League)	17.5	1.0			
28–31 Mar	Odmev	—N/a	661	**17.1**; 25	3.5; 5	10.3; 15	3.8; 5	6.1; 9	6.7; 9	2.4; 0	1.2; 0	1.1; 0	0.6; 0	–	1.4; 0	13.8; 20	0.5; 0	2.3; 0	—	2.6 (Note: 0.3 - Liberal Democrats)	26.9	2.24			
21–24 Mar	Mediana	POPTV	716	**16.8**	3.8	9.4	1.9	7.2	5.0	2.7	2.8	1.9	2.4	0.1	1.9	16.7	0.9	2.3	–	2.4 (Note: 0.6 - Let's Liberate Slovenia 0.5 - Homeland League)	22.0	0.1			
21–24 Mar	Ninamedia	Dnevnik, Večer	1,050	19.5; 23	4.9; 6	8.6; 10	3.3; 4	7.9; 10	5.1; 6	3.0; 4	0.5; 0	0.6; 0	1.0; 0	0.0; 0	1.3; 0	**20.7**; 25	0.8; 0	1.9; 0	–	1.3 (Note: 0.4 - Let's Liberate Slovenia)	19.6	1.2			
21–23 Mar	Parsifal	Nova24TV	532	**25.0**	2.7	7.8	3.5	4.3	4.1	2.8	2.0	0.8	0.9	0.6 (Note: DD 0.2%, Our Future 0.4%)	1.0	16.2	0.4	0.4	–	0.5	27.1	8.8			
14–17 Mar	Parsifal	Nova24TV	712	**22.0**	3.0	7.2	5.1	2.7	3.0	1.7	0.5	0.8	1.1	0.1	1.6	18.3	0.3	2.1	–	1.4	29.1	2.7			
7–10 Mar	Ninamedia	Dnevnik, Večer	1,050	20.2	5.4	10.1	3.3	7.5	4.9	3.4	0.4	0.8	0.9	0.4	1.4	**21.0**	1.3	1.4	–	0.3 (Note: 0.0 - Let's Liberate Slovenia)	17.3	0.8			
7–10 Mar	Mediana	Delo	700	17.2	3.8	8.8	3.6	7.6	4.8	3.7	1.0	1.4	1.6	0.7	1.6	**18.8**	0.5	2.7	–	2.1	15.0	1.6			
5 Mar	Odmev	–	867	**17.3**	3.8	10.7	2.8	6.1	6.0	2.0	0.6	0.9	0.8	–	1.4	13.6	0.1	1.6	—	2.0 (Note: 0.2 - Liberal Democrats)	30.2	3.7			
28 Feb–3 Mar	Mediana	RTVSLO	1,031	**18.3**	5.7	7.7	2.0	5.6	5.5	4.0	0.9	1.7	1.0	0.4	2.2	18.0	2.3	2.5	—	1.2 (Note: 0.0 - Liberal Democrats)	21.1	0.3			
23–25 Feb	Parsifal	Nova24TV	657	**21.0**	4.9	6.3	4.0	5.2	3.5	2.0	0.8	0.8	1.7	0.9	2.1	12.0	0.9	1.7	–	0.5	31.8	9.0			
21–24 Feb	Mediana	POPTV	715	16.4	4.3	8.6	4.8	6.1	4.5	3.2	1.0	1.1	2.1	0.3	2.5	**17.4**	0.6	2.1	—	1.0 (Note: 0.4 - Liberal Democrats)	24.0	1.0			
21–23 Feb	Ninamedia	Dnevnik, Večer	1,050	19.1	5.5	9.9	3.1	7.9	4.2	3.5	0.6	1.0	1.5	0.4	2.6	**21.2**	0.9	2.4	—	1.3 (Note: 1.1 - Liberal Democrats 0.2 - Let's Liberate Slovenia Alliance)	14.9	2.1			
19 Feb	Parsifal	Nova24TV	416	**29.2**	3.4	9.5	3.6	7.5	3.8	0.7	–	1.6	2.0	0.9	2.8	16.7	1.0	2.1	–	0.4	15.0	12.5			
14–16 Feb	Parsifal	Nova24TV	712	**22.9**	4.5	7.6	3.3	6.3	2.9	1.3	0.5	1.7	1.6	0.8	2.8	13.2	1.7	2.4	–	0.2	26.2	9.7			
7–10 Feb	Ninamedia	Dnevnik, Večer	1,050	21.2	6.7	8.0	3.4	7.5	4.9	3.4	0.9	0.8	0.7	0.9	2.1	**23.9**	0.9	1.0	—	1.6 (Note: 1.4 - Liberal Democrats)	12.2	2.7			
7–10 Feb	Mediana	Delo	710	15.0	3.7	7.0	3.7	5.1	5.1	2.7	0.9	1.9	2.4	0.9	3.5	**19.9**	1.9	2.0	—	0.8 (Note: 0.8 - Liberal Democrats)	—N/a	4.4			
9 Feb	Odmev	–	891	**17.6**	4.5	11.6	2.0	6.6	6.2	2.7	0.7	1.1	0.6	–	1.7	10.6	0.2	–	—	1.4 (Note: 0.7 - Liberal Democrats)	31.7	6.06			
31 Jan–3 Feb	Mediana	RTVSLO	1,030	15.0	5.2	6.6	2.3	7.0	4.9	3.2	0.5	2.5	2.0	1.3	4.2	**20.2**	–	–	—	4.8 (Note: 1.4 - Liberal Democrats)	20.3	5.2			
26–28 Jan	Parsifal	Planet TV	720	**18.4**	3.1	6.6	3.9	4.7	4.4	2.0	1.1	2.3	1.1	1.0	2.3	13.2	1.0	–	–	–	34.9	5.2			
25–27 Jan	Ninamedia	Dnevnik, Večer	1,050	**18.5**	3.9	9.9	2.6	6.1	4.5	3.2	1.0	0.2	0.5	0.2	1.9	16.2	0.5	0.2	—	1.8 (Note: 1.8 - Liberal Democrats)	28.9	2.3			
16 Jan	Parsifal	Nova24TV	725	**19.9**	4.4	6.5	4.0 (Note: Combined result of KON 0.6% and POS 3.4%)	6.6	2.8	2.6	1.2	2.3	1.1	0.2	0.9	10.5 (Note: Combined result of Z.DEJ 0.1% and Party of Robert Golob 10.4%)	0.8	–	–	0.9	35.5	9.5			
11–13 Jan	Ninamedia	Dnevnik, Večer	1,050	**15.5**	4.3	10.3	5.4 (Note: Combined result of KON 2.8%; ZS 1.6% and SLS 1.0%)	5.9	4.5	3.1	0.9	0.7	0.7	1.1	2.9	15.4	1.9	–	–	–	24.6	0.1			
4–6 Jan	Parsifal	Nova24TV	734	**20.7**	3.3	7.8	3.1 (Note: Combined result of KON 0.4% and POS 2.7%)	5.9	5.7	1.5	2.2	1.8	1.5	1.1	1.4	8.5 (Note: Combined result of Z.DEJ 0.3% and Party of Robert Golob 8.2%)	0.7	–	–	1.7	33.4	12.5			

=== 2021 ===
Date(s) conducted	Pollster	Client	Sample size	SDS	LMŠ	SD	POS	Levica	NSi	SAB	DeSUS	SNS	PIR	DD	ND	Z.DEJ	GS	Others	Und.	Und.	Abst.	Lead	Source
27–29 Dec	Mediana	RTV	1021	12.0	4.0	6.2	3.9	4.4	3.4	3.7	0.8	1.7	3.5	1.1	5.7	–	**15.3** (Note: polled as Party of Robert Golob, the Freedom Movement exists since 26 January 2022)	8.8 (Note: 1.8 - Vesna - Green Party 1.4 - Liberal Democrats 1.0 - Party of Tomaž Vesel)	25.3	1.4			
13–16 Dec	Parsifal	Nova24	724	**20.0**	6.1	14.0	4.0 (Note: Combined result of: 3.2 - Let's Connect Slovenia 0.8 - Modern Centre Party)	6.6	5.1	2.5	0.8	1.3	1.4	0.4	1.8	0.6	–	1.7	33.8	6.0			
2–7 Dec	Ninamedia	Dnevnik	1,002	**15.2**	8.0	13.3	3.3	7.5	5.2	4.3	0.7	0.8	2.0	1.3	2.1	–	9.0 (Note: polled as Party of Robert Golob, the Freedom Movement exists since 26 January 2022)	1.0				1.9	
29 Nov–2 Dec	Mediana	RTV	1021	**10.7**	6.3	9.8	6.6	8.6	4.3	5.2	1.8	1.2	3.7	2.3	5.5	4.5	–	2.1	27.5	17.9		0.9	
13–16 Nov	Parsifal	Nova24	717	**19.3**	6.5	13.3	4.6 (Note: Combined result of: 4.0 - Let's Connect Slovenia 0.6 - Modern Centre Party)	5.2	5.4	4.0	1.8	1.1	2.5	0.7	1.8	0.7	–	0.6	30.0	16.1		6.0	
20 Sep–4 Nov	Parsifal	Nova24	N/A	**25.4**	7.3	15.4	6.0 (Note: Combined result of: 5.0 - Let's Connect Slovenia 1.0 - Modern Centre Party)	6.7	5.1	4.3	2.8	1.6	1.6	1.0	1.2	0.3	–	1.0	20.2	16.1		10.0	
12–15 Oct	Parsifal	Nova24	707	**20.7**	6.3	10.7	4.0 (Note: Combined result of: 3.1 - Let's Connect Slovenia 0.9 - Modern Centre Party)	6.3	3.1	3.3	3.0	2.7	0.9	0.5	1.7	1.0	–	2.6	33.2	17.3		10.0	
27-30 Sep	Parsifal	Planet	715	**17.2**	7.3	11.8	4.0 (Note: Combined result of: 3.1 - Let's Connect Slovenia 0.9 - Modern Centre Party)	4.3	2.9	3.0	1.6	2.0	1.8	0.7	1.4	0.5	–	1.1	40.4	20.3		5.4	
30 Aug–2 Sep	Parsifal	Nova24	719	**15.4**	7.7	10.8	5.7 (Note: Combined result of: 4.6 - Let's Connect Slovenia 1.1 - Modern Centre Party)	8.5	2.7	4.1	2.7	3.3	1.5	0.8	2.3	0.6	–	2.1	33.8	13.9		4.6	
15–18 Jun	Parsifal	Nova24	708	**18.8**	11.6	10.8	1.7 (Note: Combined result of: 0.9 - Modern Centre Party 0.8 - Let's Connect Slovenia)	5.3	3.7	1.7	3.8	1.5	1.9	1.6	1.5	0.4	–	2.7	34.9	13.9		7.2	
10–15 Jun	Episcenter	Domovina	800	**22**	20	17	2	10	10	5	<1	<1	3	2	2	1	–	1	5			2	
24–26 May	Parsifal	Planet	752	**18.0**	9.4	8.9	2.7 (Note: Combined result of: 1.7 - Let's Connect Slovenia 1.0 - Modern Centre Party)	4.8	4.7	1.5	2.3	1.8	1.5	0.2	1.7	0.7	–	1.5	40.6	19.4		8.6	
24 May	Mediana	POP	—	**18.2**	9.0	10.0	4.8 (Note: Combined result of: 2.2 - Slovenian People's Party 1.8 - Greens of Slovenia 0.8 - Modern Centre Party)	8.4	4.5	2.7	2.5	1.4	1.5	1.1	—	—	–	3.1	33.1	8.2			
11-13 May	Ninamedia	Dnevnik	700	**18.0**	8.2	13.1	2.5 (Note: Combined result of: 1.9 - Slovenian People's Party 0.6 - Modern Centre Party)	7.3	7.3	3.6	0.5	1.0	—	—	—	—	–	1.0	37.3	4.9			
10-13 May	Parsifal	Nova24	762	**21.0**	7.9	11.5	4.6 (Note: Combined result of: 3.9 - Slovenian People's Party and New People's Party 0.7 - Modern Centre Party)	5.0	4.6	0.9	2.3	1.7	1.9	1.2	1.7	—	–	1.1	34.7	9.5			
3-5 May	Mediana	Delo	712	**17.4**	7.0	12.2	5.3 (Note: Combined result of: 3.0 - Slovenian People's Party 1.3 - Greens of Slovenia 1.0 - Modern Centre Party)	7.6	4.4	3.4	1.2	2.0	1.4	1.5	—	—	–	—	30.9	5.2			
26 Apr	Mediana	POP	714	**17.6**	8.5	10.8	3.4 (Note: Combined result of: 2.0 - Greens of Slovenia 0.8 - Slovenian People's Party 0.6 - Modern Centre Party)	7.9	5.1	4.3	1.1	1.4	2.3	1.1	—	—	–	1.4	35.1	6.8			
13-15 Apr	Ninamedia	Dnevnik	700	**19.0**	10.1	13.2	1.5 (Note: Combined result of: 1.2 - Greens of Slovenia 1.3 - Slovenian People's Party 0.6 - Modern Centre Party)	6.9	7.4	3.6	0.3	0.2	—	—	—	—	–	7.4	28.7	6.8			
12-14 Apr	Parsifal	Nova24	762	**20.0**	10.8	11.3	3.3 (Note: Combined result of: 2.6 - Slovenian People's Party and New People's Party 0.7 - Modern Centre Party)	6.4	4.1	2.6	1.6	2.3	0.8	0.1	—	—	–	0.6	36.0	8.7			
6-8 Apr	Mediana	Delo	701	**15.6**	7.5	12.4	4.3 (Note: Combined result of: 2.4 - Greens of Slovenia 1.4 - Slovenian People's Party 0.5 - Modern Centre Party)	8.4	5.8	2.4	2.6	1.9	1.6	0.6	—	—	–	—	35.0	3.2			
29 Mar	Mediana	POP	713	**18.7**	9.6	10.9	4.1 (Note: Combined result of: 1.9 - Greens of Slovenia 1.5 - Slovenian People's Party 0.7 - Modern Centre Party)	8.3	4.6	2.8	1.4	2.3	0.8	1.8	—	—	–	2.3	32.6	7.8			
18-25 Mar	Episcenter	Domovina	1350	**24**	17	19	6 (Note: Combined result of: 3 - Greens of Slovenia 2 - Slovenian People's Party 1 - Modern Centre Party)	10	9	3	1	2	—	—	—	—	—	4	5	5			
8-12 Mar	Mediana	Delo	703	**16.4**	8.8	10.4	4.9 (Note: Combined result of: 2.2 - Slovenian People's Party 1.9 - Greens of Slovenia 0.8 - Modern Centre Party)	9.0	4.5	2.2	2.3	2.1	1.2	1.2	—	—	—	—	31.5	6.0			
9-11 Mar	Ninamedia	Dnevnik	703	**18.9**	8.8	12.9	2.8 (Note: Combined result of: 1.9 - Slovenian People's Party 0.8 - Modern Centre Party)	7.7	4.2	3.8	3.1	1.7	—	—	—	—	—	—	38.5	6.0			
1-4 Mar	Parsifal	Nova24	717	**19.0**	8.2	12.1	2.6 (Note: Combined result of: 1.4 - Slovenian People's Party and New People's Party 1.2 - Modern Centre Party)	6.6	4.6	2.4	2.1	3.4	1.4	1.9	—	—	—	1.9	33.8	6.9			
1 Mar	Mediana	POP	710	**18.2**	7.9	11.0	4.8 (Note: Combined result of: 2.6 - Slovenian People's Party 1.4 - Greens of Slovenia 0.8 - Modern Centre Party)	8.2	4.3	3.9	1.2	2.3	2.0	1.6	—	—	—	0.7	33.1	7.2			
9-11 Feb	Mediana	Delo	712	**17.2**	7.1	9.5	3.6 (Note: Combined result of: 1.7 - Greens of Slovenia 1.1 - Modern Centre Party 0.8 - Slovenian People's Party)	10.0	4.7	3.4	2.1	2.3	2.0	1.2	—	—	—	—	34.9	7.2			
9-11 Feb	Ninamedia	Dnevnik	700	**17.1**	10.2	13.1	3.1 (Note: Combined result of: 2.1 - Slovenian People's Party 1.0 - Modern Centre Party)	8.8	4.2	3.1	3.1	1.2	—	—	—	—	—	—	35.9	6.0			
25-28 Jan	Parsifal	Nova24	732	**23.5**	7.7	8.1	3.2 (Note: Combined result of: 2.5 - Slovenian People's Party and New People's Party 0.7 - Modern Centre Party)	7.7	3.6	1.9	3.6	1.5	2.1	0.8	—	—	—	0.9	35.2	15.4			
25 Jan	Mediana	POP	710	**16.9**	8.8	9.0	5.1 (Note: Combined result of: 1.9 - Slovenian People's Party 1.8 - Greens of Slovenia 1.4 - Modern Centre Party)	6.9	5.0	4.1	2.5	2.4	1.7	1.1	—	—	—	1.2	34.7	7.9			
12-14 Jan	Ninamedia	Dnevnik	700	**19.9**	10.7	12.6	1.8 (Note: Combined result of: 1.1 - Slovenian People's Party 0.7 - Modern Centre Party)	10.1	4.9	3.0	3.2	1.2	—	—	—	—	—	1.0	31.8	7.3			
4-7 Jan	Mediana	Delo	709	**13.7**	7.5	8.5	4.3 (Note: Combined result of: 1.7 - Greens of Slovenia 1.5 - Slovenian People's Party 1.1 - Modern Centre Party)	9.6	4.8	3.1	2.1	2.0	1.8	1.4	—	—	—	—	35.8	4.1			

=== 2020 ===
Parties which ran in 2018

Fieldwork date	Polling firm	Publisher(s)	Sample size	SDS	LMŠ	SD	SMC	Levica	NSi	SAB	DeSUS	SNS	SLS	PPS	DD	ZS	Others	None	Und.	Abst.	Lead	Source
28 December 2020 (Note: Publication date)	Mediana	POPTV	712	**17.3**	7.3	10.2	0.9	8.4	5.6	2.3	1.7	1.3	1.5	1.8	1.1	1.2	1.3	10.3	23.0	3.9	7.1	
21–23 Dec 2020	Parsifal	Nova24TV	757	**20.9**	9.9	8.0	1.2	7.2	2.6	2.4	6.4	1.4	1.1 (Note: with NLS.)	2.1	0.6	–	0.8	6.3	14.7	14.3	11.0	
15–17 Dec 2020	Ninamedia	Dnevnik, Večer	700	**20.6**	11.7	11.8	0.1	9.1	3.8	2.9	3.7	2.0	2.2	–	–	–	1.8	6.9	23.5	–	8.8	
7–9 Dec 2020	Mediana	Delo	711	**16.9**	10.1	7.7	1.0	9.4	4.5	3.2	3.6	2.3	0.7	2.1	0.8	1.0	1.7	–	35.0	–	6.7	
7–9 Dec 2020	Parsifal	Nova24TV	727	**17.4**	10.8	7.3	0.5	5.6	5.2	2.4	7.1	1.3	2.5	1.1	1.3	–	0.3	9.9	13.6	13.7	6.6	
23 November 2020	Mediana	POPTV	711	**16.5**	10.8	11.0	0.7	8.7	4.3	2.0	3.9	2.6	1.4	1.4	1.7	1.0	0.8	14.4	12.8	2.5	5.5	
10–12 Nov 2020	Ninamedia	Dnevnik, Večer	700	**20.4**	12.7	12.6	0.2	8.2	4.6	3.3	2.5	2.0	1.4	–	–	–	1.7	–	23.9	6.7	7.7	
2–5 Nov 2020	Mediana	Delo	720	**19.6**	9.9	11.7	0.5	8.5	5.9	0.8	3.9	3.0	1.1	2.2	1.2	TBA	TBA	TBA	18.6	–	7.9	
2–4 Nov 2020	Parsifal	Nova24TV	704	**21.3**	10.1	11.1	0.5	5.9	4.2	2.4	4.7	2.0	1.0	1.6	0.4	–	0.6	6.1	18.5	9.5	10.2	
26 October 2020	Mediana	POPTV	—N/a	**16.1**	9.1	11.2	1.1	7.8	5.0	3.2	1.7	3.5	1.1	2.6	0.4	0.8	0.9	8.3	19.8	5.7	4.9	
13–15 Oct 2020	Ninamedia	Dnevnik, Večer	700	**21.1**	13.1	12.8	0.8	8.0	6.2	3.2	1.2	2.1	2.3	–	–	–	1.1	–	19.3	8.3	8.0	
1–8 Oct 2020	Mediana	Delo	712	**18.7**	10.4	9.3	0.7	7.9	4.9	2.9	2.8	1.3	1.4	1.3	1.5	0.7	0.3	–	35.7	–	8.3	
28 September 2020	Mediana	POPTV	713	**16.1**	11.5	9.3	0.3	5.9	5.3	2.3	1.0	3.1	1.7	1.2	1.5	1.0	0.5	12.1	23.0	4.0	4.6	
18 September 2020	Parsifal	Nova24TV	701	**22.7**	10.0	11.6	0.5	5.3	3.0	2.4	3.6	2.3	1.3	1.5	1.3	–	1.0	8.8	14.6	10.1	11.1	
15–17 Sep 2020	Ninamedia	Dnevnik, Večer	700	**22.1**	9.0	13.6	0.4	7.2	5.1	1.9	1.3	1.6	1.7	–	–	–	1.9	–	24.4	9.9	8.5	
7–10 Sep 2020	Mediana	Delo	724	**19.0**	8.0	9.9	1.6	6.2	3.2	3.1	3.0	1.5	2.0	1.4	1.3	1.3	–	–	23.3	–	9.1	
24 August 2020	Mediana	POPTV	714	**18.2**	9.5	9.5	1.1	8.0	4.5	1.7	3.7	3.0	1.9	1.2	1.2	1.1	–	14.5	15.3	4.7	8.7	
18–24 Aug 2020	Parsifal	Nova24TV	801	**20.9**	10.2	11.9	1.1	6.8	3.1	1.4	2.6	2.1	2.0	1.5	0.9	–	1.7	7.9	12.7	13.4	9.0	
11–13 Aug 2020	Ninamedia	Dnevnik, Večer	700	**23.2**	9.4	13.9	0.1	6.6	5.7	1.0	1.8	2.1	0.3	–	–	–	0.5	–	25.9	9.3	9.3	
3–6 Aug 2020	Mediana	Delo	715	**19.5**	9.7	11.2	1.4	7.1	5.0	1.9	1.5	1.6	1.2	2.4	0.8	1.1		12.7	18.9		8.3	
26 July 2020	Mediana	POPTV	—N/a	**17.4**	8.1	12.3	0.4	9.2	3.8	2.4	2.3	2.1	2.3	1.5	1.3	1.4	0.0	11.3	19.1	4.0	5.1	
14–16 Jul 2020	Ninamedia	Dnevnik, Večer	700	**22.7**; 32	10.8; 15	14.7; 21	0.3; 0	6.7; 10	4.3; 6	1.4; 0	2.8; 4	0.5; 0	1.8; 0	–	–	–	–	–	24.2	9.5	8.0	
6–9 Jul 2020	Mediana	Delo	725	**18.5**	12.5	11.7	2.0	6.6	4.3	1.6	2.6	2.8	1.7	2.4	0.5	0.8		9.6	18.3		6.0	
29 Jun–2 Jul 2020	Parsifal	Nova24TV	715	**22.4**	14.9	11.9	0.4	6.5	3.8	0.9	4.1	3.1	1.8	1.9	0.4	–	0.2	5.8	12.3	9.9	7.5	
28 June 2020	Mediana	POPTV	717	**16.8**	10.3	8.3	1.1	8.9	4.8	1.8	4.5	3.7	2.0	1.6	0.6	1.0		8.9	21.1	2.6	6.5	
15–17 Jun 2020	Parsifal	Nova24TV	723	**22.3**	12.5	9.2	1.1	5.9	5.4	1.5	4.1	1.4	2.9	0.3	1.7	–	0.7	8.5	14.6	7.2	10.3	
9–11 Jun 2020	Ninamedia	Dnevnik, Večer	700	**22.7**; 31	10.9; 15	15.2; 21	0.3; 0	8.2; 12	3.9; 5	1.3; 0	2.9; 4	1.4; 0	1.1; 0	–	–	–	0.6	–	22.6	8.9	7.5	
1–4 Jun 2020	Mediana	Delo	726	**18.8**	11.8	9.9	1.1	7.1	3.5	1.6	2.3	2.0	1.4	0.7	1.5	0.2	1.4	14.8	22.0	–	7.0	
20–22 May 2020	Parsifal	Nova24TV	701	**22.7**	15.7	7.0	0.3	6.3	2.8	1.7	4.3	2.9	2.0	0.5	0.2	–	1.3	8.9	14.1	9.3	8.0	
18–21 May 2020	Mediana	POPTV	718	**18.5**	14.0	6.6	0.2	7.3	3.7	2.4	2.6	2.4	1.2	2.6	1.5	0.3	1.8	11.6	19.6	3.3	4.5	
12–13 May 2020	Ninamedia	Dnevnik, Večer	700	**22.1**; 34	12.2; 19	8.2; 13	0.3; 0	6.1; 10	4.1; 6	1.1; 0	3.7; 6	1.8; 0	1.8; 0	–	–	–	0.8	–	27.8	9.8	9.9	
6–8 May 2020	Parsifal	Nova24TV (Note: Poll numbers are given based on decided voters.)	776	**30.6**	17.9	12.8	0.2	9.5	6.2	3.7	6.4	5.8	2.8	3.4	0.8	–	–	–	–	–	19.8	
4–8 May 2020	Mediana	Delo	712	**16.3**	14.0	8.4	2.3	7.9	5.3	0.9	3.4	1.8	0.2	–	–	–	—N/a	—N/a	—N/a	—N/a	2.3	
26 April 2020	Mediana	POPTV	741	**19.3**	11.9	6.8	0.9	7.8	4.0	3.1	5.2	2.8	1.0	1.7	0.9	0.9	0.6	0.0	20.2	10.9	8.2	
14–16 Apr 2020	Ninamedia	Dnevnik, Večer	700	**22.5**; 34	9.8; 15	8.9; 14	1.0; 0	6.2; 9	4.8; 7	0.76; 0	2.6; 4	3.5; 5	0.6; 0	–	–	–	0.8	–	28.4	10.5	12.7	
6–9 Apr 2020	Mediana	Delo	724	**18.7**	11.5	8.7	0.8	6.6	3.9	2.6	3.1	3.2	1.5	2.2	1.1	1.1	—N/a	—N/a	—N/a	—N/a	7.2	
10–19 Mar 2020	Mediana	POPTV	—N/a	**20.0**	13.2	7.3	0.8	8.8	3.8	0.9	2.5	3.6	1.8	1.1	1.2	1.2	0.3	1.3	18.9	11.1	6.8	
10–12 Mar 2020	Ninamedia	Dnevnik, Večer	700	**23.5**; 31	15.0; 20	9.3; 12	0.5; 0	6.4; 9	6.3; 8	0.7; 0	2.6; 4	2.8; 4	1.0; 0	–	–	–	0.6	–	23.9	7.4	8.5	
25 Feb–5 Mar 2020	Mediana	Delo	777	**19.6**	13.8	6.7	2.5	7.0	5.0	1.2	3.0	2.5	1.9	1.8	1.3	1.4	—N/a	—N/a	—N/a	—N/a	5.8	
27–28 Feb 2020	Parsifal	Nova24TV	744	**20.4**	13.2	7.8	2.2	4.7	5.5	1.6	4.1	3.2	2.8	0.7	0.1	–	1.4	5.5	15.6	11.3	7.2	
23 February 2020	Mediana	POPTV	767	**18.2**	13.4	6.1	2.8	7.3	4.3	0.6	3.2	4.0	0.6	1.3	1.5	0.3	1.9	1.1	20.7	6.0	4.8	
19–20 Feb 2020	Parsifal	Nova24TV	720	**22.4**	16.2	5.3	2.5	5.4	3.6	0.9	4.1	3.0	2.3	1.3	0.5	–	0.8	6.8	14.0	11.0	6.2	
12–13 Feb 2020	Parsifal	Nova24TV	723	**20.1**	12.8	6.5	3.2	4.9	5.2	1.2	3.9	3.0	2.3	0.1	0.7	–	1.4	8.1	17.0	9.4	7.3	
11–13 Feb 2020	Ninamedia	Dnevnik, Večer	700	**19.6**; 28	17.1; 25	8.2; 12	2.0; 0	5.3; 8	5.2; 7	1.0; 0	2.9; 4	2.5; 4	2.3; 0	–	–	–	0.8	–	24.9	8.2	2.5	
3–5 Feb 2020	Parsifal	Nova24TV	702	**18.3**	17.2	6.5	2.0	5.2	4.4	2.0	4.0	5.4	3.0	1.8	0.5	–	1.4	6.6	15.6	6.1	1.1	
28 Jan–3 Feb 2020	Mediana	Delo	777	**18.2**	16.3	7.9	2.5	7.9	4.1	2.0	2.2	3.6	1.9	1.3	0.9	1	0.9	11.7	14.5	1.6	1.9	
27–29 Jan 2020	Parsifal	Nova24TV	952	**17.4**	17.3	6.7	1.8	4.6	3.1	2.2	3.7	3.7	2.0	–	–	–	1.2	5.7	19.0	11.4	0.1	
26 January 2020	Mediana	POPTV	767	14.1	**15.1**	7.2	1.5	7.2	6.2	1.8	4.1	2.6	1.3	1.4	0.9	0.6	0.6	10.0	22.8	1.9	1.0	
14–16 Jan 2020	Ninamedia	Dnevnik, Večer	700	16.9	**19.4**	8.1	0.3	6.0	6.5	0.8	2.9	2.3	2.4	–	–	–	0.9	–	23.7	9.8	2.5	
13–16 Jan 2020	Parsifal	Nova24TV	924	**23.0**	19.3	6.5	0.7	9.2	6.9	2.8	3.8	3.3	2.1	–	–	–	2.5	2.8	17.0	–	3.7	
3–9 Jan 2020	Mediana	Delo	723	13.3	**14.0**	6.0	1.7	7.0	6.9	2.0	3.0	3.3	1.2	1.1	0.9	1.3	1.0	10.2	24.5	0.6	0.7	
22 December 2019	Mediana	POPTV	726	12.7	**13.1**	6.7	1.9	8.9	5.3	2.6	3.4	2.1	0.9	2.0	1.0	0.6	0.8	25.5	11.5	1.0	0.4	
10–12 Dec 2019	Ninamedia	RTVSLO, Dnevnik	700	16.6	**20.2**	9.7	0.2	6.5	5.3	0.7	3.1	2.5	2.8	–	–	–	0.9	–	23.1	8.3	3.6	
2–5 Dec 2019	Parsifal	Nova24TV	906	**17.6**	16.6	7.5	0.7	7.0	4.2	1.8	4.6	4.3	3.0	–	–	–	1.4	10.8	14.1	10.8	1.0	
26 Nov–5 Dec 2019	Mediana	Delo	732	**16.3**	16.1	6.3	0.9	8.4	4.9	1.8	3.4	2.3	1.4	2.1	–	–	4.0	10.9	17.8	3.4	0.2	
24 November 2019	Mediana	POPTV	732	13.8	**15.4**	9.5	1.3	8.8	3.6	1.3	1.5	3.6	1.0	2.4	1.3	0.9	0.8	21.1	9.9	3.5	1.6	
12–14 Nov 2019	Ninamedia	RTVSLO, Dnevnik	700	13.5	**21.3**	7.1	0.6	6.6	7.4	0.9	3.2	1.1	1.7	–	–	–	1.0	–	24.1	11.4	7.8	
4–7 Nov 2019	Parsifal	Nova24TV	705	24.8	**25.9**	6.6	1.9	8.9	3.5	1.2	2.1	2.1	3.6	–	–	–	2.7	2.3	14.4	–	1.1	
28 Oct–7 Nov 2019	Mediana	Delo	735	15.2	**15.4**	6.0	1.9	11.2	5.9	2.3	2.2	3.2	1.0	1.0	0.8	1.2	0.1	11.6	18.0	0.4	0.2	
25 October 2019	Mediana	POPTV	726	15.7	**15.8**	5.4	1.8	7.2	5.0	2.0	2.8	3.0	0.9	1.1	0.8	0.5	1.2	13.6	20.7	2.4	0.1	
15–17 Oct 2019	Ninamedia	RTVSLO, Dnevnik	700	14.7	**20.1**	10.4	1.3	6.2	5.2	1.0	3.4	0.9	1.8	–	–	–	0.2	–	19.8	15.0	5.4	
2–10 Oct 2019	Mediana	Delo	736	15.7	**16.8**	6.0	0.4	5.3	4.7	2.2	3.9	3.7	1.8	1.5	1.3	1.6	0.9	9.1	21.7	1.1	1.1	
22 September 2019	Mediana	POPTV	715	14.9	**16.1**	7.0	0.4	7.5	5.3	1.6	2.2	2.9	2.5	0.8	0.9	1.1	0.3	12.4	20.8		1.2	
10–12 Sep 2019	Ninamedia	RTVSLO, Dnevnik	700	15.5	**23.3**	9.8	0.9	6.9	4.7	1.9	3.1	2.1	3.0	–	–	–	1.1	–	17.9	9.7	7.8	
28 Aug–5 Sep 2019	Mediana	Delo	726	14.7	**18.9**	6.4	1.5	6.4	5.1	2.1	2.3	2.9	1.9	0.6	0.5	0.7	0.7	11.4	19.8	–	4.2	
25 August 2019	Mediana	POPTV	722	15.6	**18.8**	6.9	1.8	4.8	4.0	2.4	2.9	2.3	2.0	1.7	0.8	0.8	1.1	10.2	20.3	0.7	3.2	
12–14 Aug 2019	Ninamedia	RTVSLO, Dnevnik	700	15.5	**22.2**	10.0	0.5	6.2	3.6	2.4	3.3	1.8	1.5	–	–	–	0.6	–	23.3	9.0	6.7	
31 Jul–8 Aug 2019	Mediana	Delo	736	14.2	**16.8**	7.2	2.9	6.5	6.7	1.8	2.2	3.3	2.3	1.2	1.7	1.4	0.6	10.9	17.0	0.9	2.6	
28 July 2019	Mediana	POPTV	718	18.2	**19.2**	7.5	1.0	6.1	4.2	1.7	3.1	3.3	1.0	2.3	0.2	1.1	0.7	11.5	16.0		1.0	
9–11 Jul 2019	Ninamedia	RTVSLO, Dnevnik	700	17.7	**21.2**	10.0	1.0	6.1	5.4	1.1	3.4	1.9	1.6	–	–	–	1.1	–	20.7	8.9	3.3	
3–11 Jul 2019	Mediana	Delo	715	14.3	**14.6**	7.8	1.5	7.7	5.3	1.9	3.3	3.6	1.4	1.2	1.2	0.4	0.4	11.5	19.2	–	0.3	
24 June 2019	Mediana	POPTV	718	15.0	**16.6**	7.6	1.2	5.8	5.9	2.0	2.4	2.9	2.0	1.7	0.7	1.4	0.1	12.0	19.3	0.5	1.6	
11–13 Jun 2019	Ninamedia	RTVSLO, Dnevnik	700	18.1	**24.0**	9.8	0.6	6.1	6.5	1.3	3.3	1.7	1.6	–	–	–	2.8	–	18.9	–	5.9	
14–23 May 2019	Mediana	POPTV	735	14.2	**16.8**	8.7	1.2	6.2	6.1	2.2	3.5	4.0	2.1	2.5	1.1	0.4	1.0	9.7	16.3	–	2.6	
14–16 May 2019	Ninamedia	RTVSLO, Dnevnik	700	17.2	**23.3**	11.0	0.3	6.1	4.5	1.5	3.1	1.7	2.3	–	–	–	1.8	–	20.2	7.0	6.1	
28 April 2019	Mediana	POPTV	714	14.3	**17.2**	6.4	3.5	5.9	5.5	1.3	2.4	3.9	1.5	2.1	1.0	0.4	1.7	11.6	18.3	0.4	2.9	
9–11 Apr 2019	Ninamedia	RTVSLO, Dnevnik	700	14.2	**26.2**	9.6	0.5	6.4	7.1	1.9	3.1	1.5	0.6	–	–	–	0.5	–	20.5	7.9	12.0	
1–4 Apr 2019	Parsifal	Nova24TV	702	**18.9**	16.8	7.1	1.8	4.7	5.0	2.1	3.0	4.2	3.3	–	–	–	1.4	4.8	18.1	8.7	2.1	
24 March 2019	Mediana	POPTV	792	15.9	**16.6**	5.7	3.2	6.5	6.6	3.5	3.3	2.8	1.6	1.7	0.9	1.2	0.1	9.8	17.2	0.7	0.7	
12–14 Mar 2019	Ninamedia	RTVSLO, Dnevnik	700	13.7	**28.0**	8.1	0.4	6.2	8.2	1.9	3.1	2.4	1.7	–	–	–	1.0	–	20.1	5.4	14.3	
26 Feb-7 Mar 2019	Mediana	Delo	729	16.0	**19.4**	6.7	0.8	8.1	6.8	1.5	2.8	2.1	1.9	1.1	1.1	0.2	0.4	10.0	18.3	0.8	3.4	
24 February 2019	Mediana	POPTV	707	16.1	**20.6**	5.4	2.5	6.7	4.8	3.3	3.3	2.5	2.9	0.8	0.5	0.5	0.6	8.2	17.4	1.4	4.5	
12–14 Feb 2019	Ninamedia	RTVSLO, Dnevnik	700	11.6	**31.3**	8.9	2.7	6.2	3.9	2.9	2.9	2.5	2.5	–	–	–	0.7	–	19.7	4.2	19.7	
29 Jan-6 Feb 2019	Mediana	Delo	731	15.1	**22.4**	5.8	2.7	5.9	5.2	2.4	1.7	2.6	1.4	2.7	1.2	1.3	1.1	11.8	14.3	–	7.3	
27 January 2019	Mediana	POPTV	707	**16.6**	16.0	9.2	1.7	7.6	3.2	1.9	2.4	3.8	4.0	2.5	0.5	1.0	0.2	8.4	17.5	0.3	0.6	
14 January 2019	Parsifal	Nova24TV	—N/a	**18.1**	16.4	7.4	1.9	4.6	4.2	1.6	4.1	2.2	2.6	0.9	0.8	–	0.5	13.1	18.0	3.2	1.7	
8–10 Jan 2019	Ninamedia	RTVSLO, Dnevnik	700	16.9	**18.0**	11.7	3.1	7.1	4.1	2.5	2.9	1.7	3.1	–	–	–	0.1	–	21.8	7.0	1.1	
3–10 Jan 2019	Mediana	Delo	743	**16.2**	13.9	6.5	3.7	6.8	5.4	3.4	2.0	4.1	3.0	1.1	0.7	1.3	0.7	7.1	21.2	0.1	2.3	
23 December 2018	Mediana	POPTV	707	**17.5**	10.7	9.0	3.8	8.9	5.2	2.1	4.5	3.7	2.0	1.0	1.0	0.6	0.7	9.1	17.7	0.5	6.7	
11–13 Dec 2018	Ninamedia	RTVSLO, Dnevnik	700	**18.7**	12.8	12.3	3.1	6.9	5.9	2.4	3.0	2.4	–	–	–	–	3.2	–	20.8	8.4	5.9	
26 Nov-6 Dec 2018	Mediana	Delo	717	**18.1**	8.5	10.5	4.9	6.7	4.2	2.2	3.5	3.2	5.5	1.2	1.2	1.1	1.6	7.8	15.8	1.4	7.6	
13–22 Nov 2018	Mediana	POPTV/Delo	714	**18.3**	7.0	8.9	3.7	6.1	5.5	3.2	3.4	3.8	3.8	2.0	0.6	1.1	0.8	9.4	16.7	0.9	9.4	
19–20 Nov 2018	Ninamedia	RTVSLO, Dnevnik	700	**18.0**	12.2	14.7	5.0	8.1	6.2	2.3	3.7	3.7	–	–	–	–	2.1	–	17.	6.4	5.8	
28 October 2018	Mediana	POPTV	725	**19.5**	8.5	7.2	3.1	6.2	5.1	3.1	3.3	2.5	2.5	0.9	1.1	0.5	0.5	8.8	23.3	0.6	11.0	
14 October 2018	Ninamedia	RTVSLO, Dnevnik	700	**16.8**	13.8	12.2	4.1	7.3	4.9	2.9	3.9	1.8	–	–	–	–	3.2	–	19.9	9.2	3.0	
3–11 Oct 2018	Mediana	Delo	725	**18.6**	8.9	7.0	4.8	5.0	4.9	3.7	2.2	3.2	–	–	–	–	–	–	–	–	9.7	
23 September 2018	Mediana	POPTV	705	**18.3**	7.7	8.1	3.7	6.1	5.4	4.3	3.0	2.6	1.0	1.2	0.8	0.6	0.9	10.8	22.5	0.5	10.2	
11–13 Sep 2018	Ninamedia	RTVSLO	700	**23.7**	10.2	9.8	7.1	6.2	6.1	3.7	3.0	2.4	–	–	–	–	1.1	–	19.9	6.8	13.5	
30 Aug-6 Sep 2018	Mediana	Delo	715	**17.9**	7.2	6.6	4.4	6.9	4.7	3.2	4.0	3.2	3.0	–	–	–	–	14.6	18.5	–	10.7	
26 August 2018	Mediana	POPTV	712	**20.9**	9.1	6.9	4.3	6.4	4.4	3.2	1.9	3.1	0.7	1.8	1.0	0.6	0.6	12.4	19.8	0.6	11.8	
13–15 Aug 2018	Ninamedia	RTVSLO, Dnevnik	700	**24.0**	10.1	10.1	3.1	6.8	4.8	1.7	3.2	2.3	–	–	–	–	2.3	–	19.7	11.7	12.9	
29 July 2018	Mediana	POPTV	730	**20.0**	10.4	7.0	4.8	7.4	5.1	3.8	1.7	4.1	1.1	1.3	0.8	0.5	0.9	9.4	18.1	–	9.6	
10–12 Jul 2018	Ninamedia	RTVSLO, Dnevnik	700	**25.3**	10.7	8.8	8.9	7.6	4.8	3.0	3.1	2.2	–	–	–	–	2.6	–	13.6	9.5	14.6	
23 June 2018	Mediana	POPTV	743	**24.7**	10.1	8.2	5.6	8.4	4.6	3.5	2.7	3.8	2.0	0.9	0.9	0.6	1.0	6.4	13.3	–	14.6	
18–20 Jun 2018	Parsifal	Nova24TV	611	**21.5**	12.7	9.3	4.3	9.9	4.2	5.8	3.2	4.2	–	–	–	–	–	–	–	–	8.8	
12–14 Jun 2018	Ninamedia	RTVSLO, Dnevnik	700	**25.1**	11.6	9.2	9.2	8.8	3.2	3.8	3.1	3.4	–	–	–	–	4.3	–	14.3	3.9	13.5	
5–6 Jun 2018	Parsifal	Nova24TV	690	**23.0**	12.2	8.8	5.5	7.5	4.3	3.5	1.2	3.4	–	–	–	–	4.2	2.4	7.0	17.1	10.8	
3 June 2018	Election results		891,097	24.9	12.6	9.9	9.8	9.3	7.2	5.1	4.9	4.2	2.6	2.2	1.5	1.1	4.7	(47.4)			12.3	
3 June 2018	Election results		88	25	13	10	10	9	7	5	5	4	–	–	–	–	–	–				

== Hypothetical Scenarios ==
Parties which ran in 2018

Fieldwork date	Polling firm	Publisher(s)	Sample size	SDS	LMŠ	SD	SMC	Levica	NSi	SAB	DeSUS	SNS	SLS	PPS	DD	AČZS	Others	None	Und.	Abst.	Lead	Source	
7–10 Feb 2022	Mediana	Delo	710	18.2	4.8	10.0	1.4	7.4	5.4	3.5	0.8	1.5	1.2	2.8	1.4	1.4	—N/a	8.1	17.5	—N/a	0.7		
31 Jan–3 Feb 2022	Mediana	RTVSLO	1,030	18.5	6.0	9.1	1.0	8.0	4.5	3.1	1.4	1.5	1.2	1.9	1.3	1.8	10.1	7.8	17.8	5.3	9.4		
16–19 Jan 2022	Mediana	POPTV	658	16.3	6.3	11.3	0.2	7.6	4.6	4.3	1.2	3.6	—N/a	1.6	1.0	—N/a	—N/a	9.1	22.7	2.2	5.0		
11–13 Jan 2022	Ninamedia	Dnevnik, Večer	700	18.1	5.1	13.6	—N/a	7.8	5.3	4.0	0.9	0.4	0.2	1.2	—N/a	—N/a	4.1 (Note: Open-ended question; Golob 2.4%, Our Country 1.4%, RESNI.CA 1.3%)	31.1		5.4	4.5		
27–29 Dec 2021	Mediana	RTVSLO	1021	17.6	5.5	12.4	0.8	6.8	4.6	3.9	1.5	1.9	1.9	3.3	1.9	2.4	3.7	9.2	19.2	4.0	5.2		
27 Dec 2021 (Note: Publication date)	Mediana	POPTV	710	17.5	6.3	10.1	0.9	9.3	6.1	2.8	0.9	1.0	0.7	2.5	1.7	1.6	3.3	11.4	20.5	3.3	7.4		
14–16 Dec 2021	Ninamedia	Dnevnik, Večer	700	17.7	7.5	13.2	0.5	8.0	6.9	4.1	0.5	0.5	1.9	–	–	–	4.7	–	31.8	4.3	4.5		
6–9 Dec 2021	Mediana	Delo	717	18.9	4.8	11.8	—N/a	8.2	5.7	5.8	1.2	1.6	1.9	2.5	1.5	1.4	4.0	c. 6.0	19.7	—N/a	7.1		
29 Nov–2 Dec 2021	Mediana	RTVSLO	1021	16.3	8.3	11.8	0.8	8.4	5.9	4.3	1.4	1.6	1.7	2.0	1.5	2.1	2.6	9.1	17.9	4.2	4.5		
29 Nov 2021	Mediana	POPTV	710	16.1	5.3	11.0	0.7	7.5	5.8	4.4	2.0	0.9	0.9	2.8	1.0	1.8	2.4	11.3	22.5	3.7	5.1		
9–11 Nov 2021	Ninamedia	Dnevnik, Večer	700	17.0	7.3	13.9	0.3	8.1	6.6	4.3	1.2	1.2	1.7	–	–	–	1.6	–	32.7	4.1	3.1		
8 Nov 2021	Mediana	Delo	—N/a	15.6	6.0	12.6	0.4	7.2	5.9	3.7	0.4	1.8	1.4	1.8	1.9	1.7	2.7	12.0	20.0	3.1	3.0		
25 Oct 2021	Mediana	POPTV	—N/a	18.6	5.6	11.5	1.2	9.0	5.0	4.0	0.9	2.4	1.3	1.6	0.6	1.8	3.6	9.9	20.9	2.0	7.1		
12–14 Oct 2021	Ninamedia	Dnevnik, Večer	700	16.8	6.3	14.0	0.5	8.6	5.3	5.1	1.1	1.2	1.8	–	–	–	–	–	30.4	8.1	2.8		
4–7 Oct 2021	Mediana	Delo	717	17.6	8.6	8.7	0.7	8.4	5.1	4.3	1.6	0.7	1.6	2.9	0.8	1.1	1.8	10.0	22.8	—N/a	9.0		
27 Sep 2021	Mediana	POPTV	—N/a	15.0	7.0	9.6	0.4	8.0	3.9	5.2	1.0	1.4	2.0	1.7	0.8	1.1	2.0	11.5	26.1	3.4	5.4		
14–16 Sep 2021	Ninamedia	Dnevnik, Večer	700	18.4	8.9	13.3	0.5	9.2	5.3	3.5	0.9	1.6	1.5	–	–	–	2.5	–	27.0	7.4	5.1		
6–9 Sep 2021	Mediana	Delo	711	18.3	6.3	10.3	1.2	7.7	4.1	3.8	2.0	1.7	0.4	0.8	0.9	1.1	—N/a	9.0	26.2	—N/a	8.0		
23 August 2021	Mediana	POPTV	–	16.1	5.6	11.1	0.4	8.8	5.6	4.1	1.4	1.8	1.1	2.5	1.5	2.0	1.2	10.7	23.3	2.7	5.0		
10–12 Aug 2021	Ninamedia	Dnevnik, Večer	700	18.0	8.5	12.2	0.7	8.9	5.5	3.4	0.8	1.4	1.4	–	–	–	1.8	–	30.4	6.9	5.8		
2–5 Aug 2021	Mediana	Delo	717	17.1	7.3	12.7	0.7	8.6	3.7	2.1	1.6	1.8	2.0	2.6	0.8	2.3	2.8	10.7	19.4	3.7	4.4		
25 July 2021	Mediana	POPTV	714	18.0	7.9	11.7	0.6	8.0	4.2	2.7	2.3	1.8	1.4	1.9	–	1.2	3.0	12.9	19.2	2.0	6.3		
13–15 Jul 2021	Ninamedia	Dnevnik, Večer	700	18.2; 28	9.2; 14	12.7; 19	0.3; 0	10.1; 15	4.7; 7	3.6; 5	0.7; 0	0.6; 0	1.1; 0	–	–	–	2.7	–	29.6	6.5	5.5		
5–7 Jul 2021	Mediana	Delo	710	17.3	7.7	11.7	0.4	8.4	5.7	3.2	3.4	0.9	1.2	3.2	2.0	1.6	–	11.2	17.6	3.0	6.6		
27 June 2021	Mediana	POPTV	713	18.9	8.4	9.5	–	9.4	4.9	3.2	2.1	–	1.6	2.6	–	1.7	–	12.0	18.2	2.6	9.4		
15–17 Jun 2021	Ninamedia	Dnevnik, Večer	700	19.1; 29	8.8; 14	12.0; 19	0.6; 0	6.9; 11	6.5; 10	3.4; 5	0.9; 0	1.1; 0	2.3; 0	–	–	–	0.8	6.9	30.5	–	7.1		
7–10 Jun 2021	Mediana	Delo	710	17.3	9.7	10.8	0.5	8.6	3.5	2.3	2.7	1.7	1.6	1.9	2.0	1.7	2.3	8.4	19.6	4.0	6.5		–

== Other ==
In late February 2021, falsified results from a 24ur Mediana poll were published and began to circulate on Twitter. The falsified image purported to show the tabulated results of a spiked poll that found pro-government parties in a comfortable lead. The falsified results were then shared by multiple politicians (including the prime minister). 24ur lodged a criminal complaint against the originator of the fabricated poll.
