= 2022 Slovenian parliamentary election =

- 24 April 2022

All 90 seats in the National Assembly 46 seats needed for a majority
- Turnout: 70.96% (▲18.33pp)
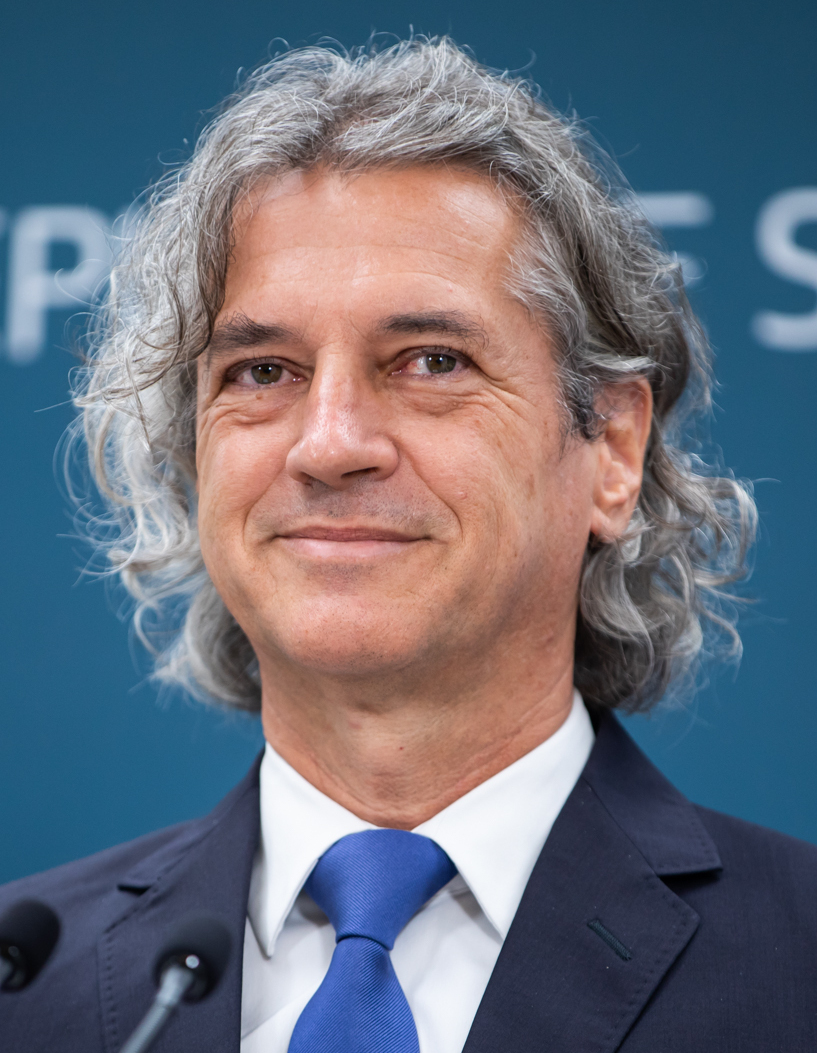

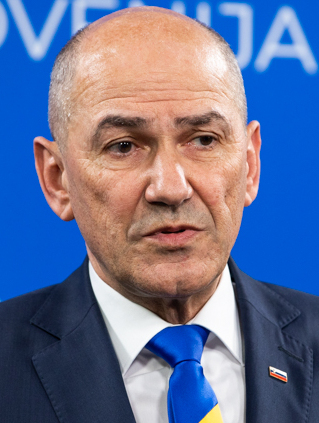

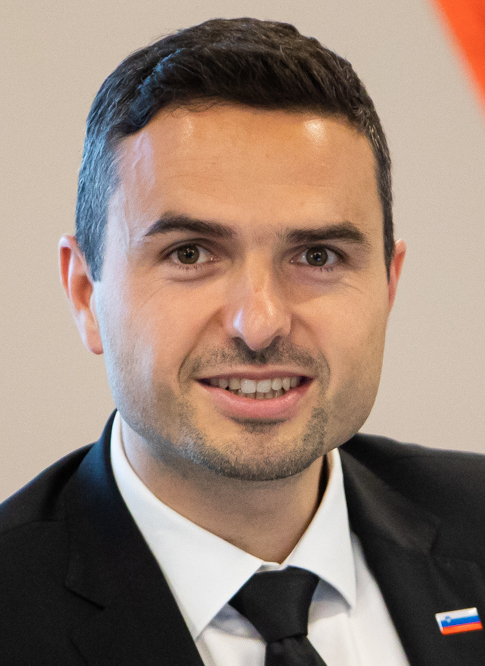

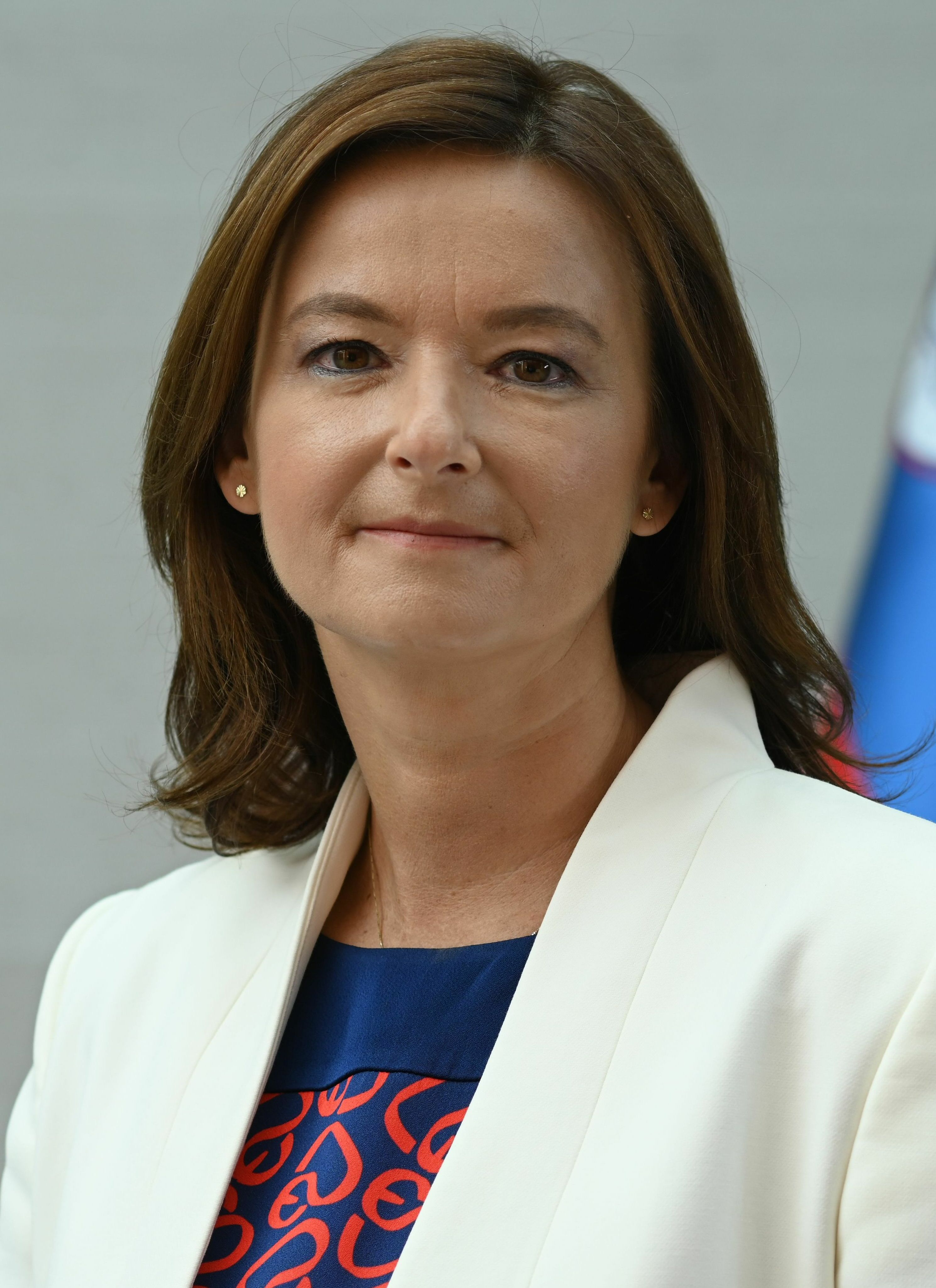

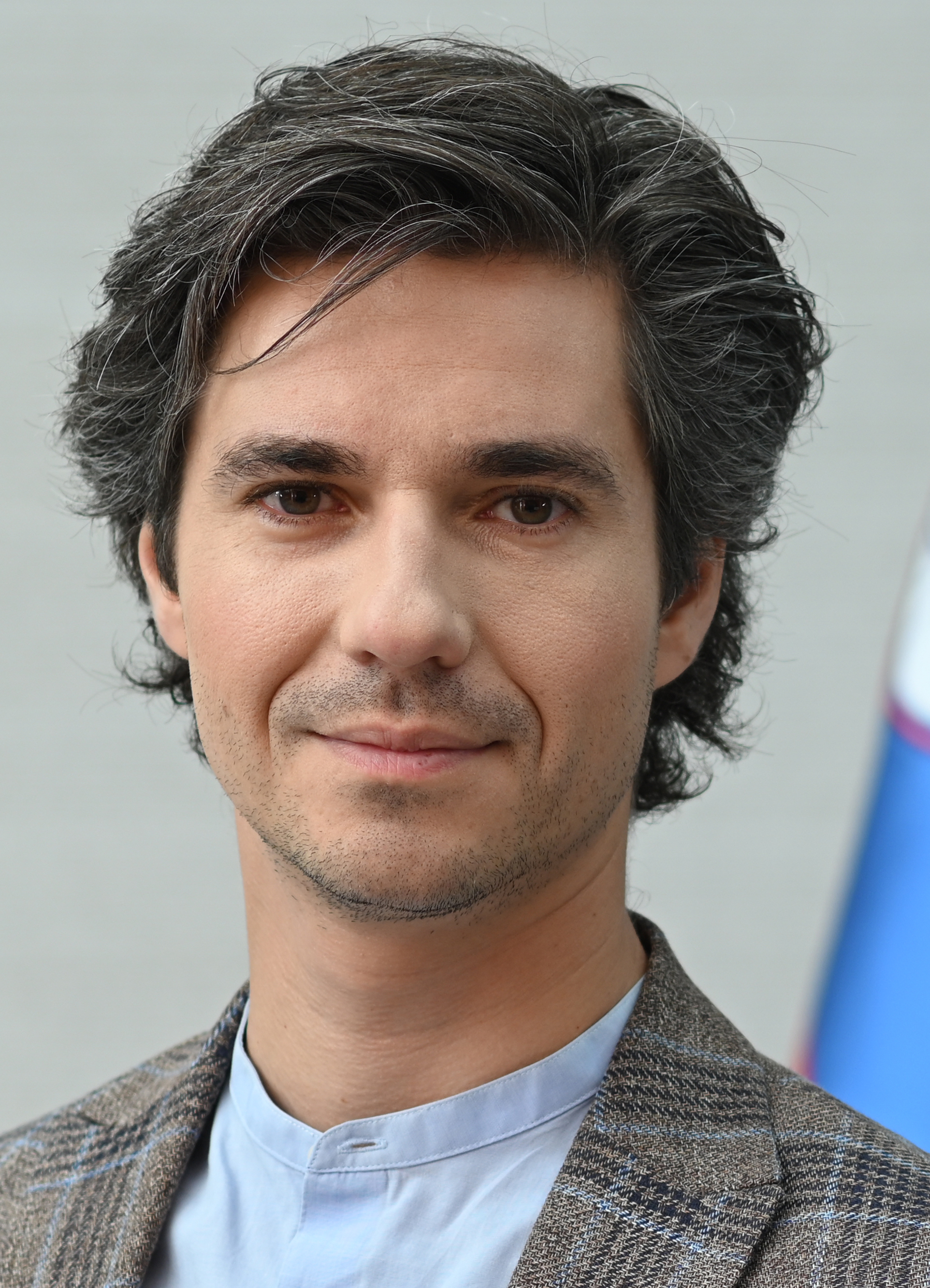
| | First party | Second party | Third party |
|---|---|---|---|
| Leader | Robert Golob | Janez Janša | Matej Tonin |
| Party | GS | SDS | NSi |
| Last election | Did not exist | 24.92%, 25 seats | 7.16%, 7 seats |
| Seats won | 41 | 27 | 8 |
| Seat change | New | ▲2 | ▲1 |
| Popular vote | 410,769 | 279,897 | 81,794 |
| Percentage | 34.45% | 23.48% | 6.86% |
| Swing | New | ▼1.44pp | ▼0.30pp |
| | Fourth party | Fifth party |
| Leader | Tanja Fajon | Luka Mesec |
| Party | SD | Levica |
| Last election | 9.93%, 10 seats | 9.33%, 9 seats |
| Seats won | 7 | 5 |
| Seat change | ▼3 | ▼4 |
| Popular vote | 79,709 | 53,234 |
| Percentage | 6.69% | 4.46% |
| Swing | ▼3.24pp | ▼4.87pp |
- Map of the election results, showing the seats won by each party in each of the 8 multi-member constituencies.
Prime Minister before election
Janez Janša
SDS
Elected Prime Minister
Robert Golob
GS

Parliamentary elections were held in Slovenia on 24 April 2022 to elect all 90 members of the National Assembly.

The ruling Slovenian Democratic Party (SDS), led by prime minister Janez Janša, conceded and was defeated by Robert Golob and his Freedom Movement (GS). New Slovenia (NSi) placed third, and was followed by the Social Democrats (SD) and The Left (Levica), both of which suffered some losses. The Democratic Party of Pensioners of Slovenia, Party of Alenka Bratušek, Slovenian National Party and the List of Marjan Šarec fell below the 4% electoral threshold and won no seats. Turnout stood at 70%, a substantial increase compared to previous two elections (52.63% in 2018 and 51.71% in 2014). Internationally, the election has been described as a defeat for Janša and right-wing populism, Janša being a supporter of former US president Donald Trump and an ally of Hungary's Prime Minister Viktor Orbán.

Following the election, the Freedom Movement formed a three-party centre-left coalition government with the Social Democrats and The Left, with Robert Golob heading the 15th Government as the next prime minister.

== Electoral system ==
The 90 members of the National Assembly are elected through two methods. Eighty-eight seats are elected by open list proportional representation in eight 11-seat constituencies and seats, with seats allocated to parties at the constituency level using the Droop quota.

Elected Deputies are identified by ranking all of a party's candidates in a constituency based on the percentage of votes they received in their respective districts. Seats that remain unallocated are then allocated to the parties at the national level using the D'Hondt method, with an electoral threshold of 4%.

Although the country is divided into 88 electoral districts, deputies are not elected from all 88 districts. In practice, more than one deputy is elected in some districts, resulting in other districts having no elected deputy. For instance, 21 of the 88 electoral districts had no elected deputy in the 2014 elections.

Parties must ensure that at least 35% of their candidate lists represent each gender, except in cases where a list contains only three candidates, in which case at least one candidate of each gender is required.

Two additional deputies are elected by the Italian and Hungarian minorities using plurality voting.

== Campaign ==
President Borut Pahor signed a decree for the election to be held on 24 April 2022. Pahor explained that he will nominate a prime minister based on the composition of the parliament, requesting leaders of parliamentary groups to put forward at least 46 signatures. Prime Minister Janez Janša tested positive for COVID-19 on the same day.

Following the decision of the ECtHR in The Committee for the organization and registration of the Romanian Communist Party v. Romania case in which the ECtHR confirmed Romania's decision to refuse to register a political party that did not distance itself from the former communist regime, Vili Kovačič asked the Constitutional Court to decide on the constitutionality of The Left's program and actions of The Left and Social Democrats. The latter is the legal successor of the League of Communists of Slovenia. The Constitutional Court rejected Vili Kovačič's proposal to decide on constitutionality of The Left's program and actions of The Left and Social Democrats as groundless.

Aleksandra Pivec submitted 1500 signatures to support Our Country's candidate lists. She also stated that MPs Branko Simonovič and Ivan Hršak of DeSUS may join her party. DeSUS and LIDE decided to form a joint candidate lists for the election. Karl Erjavec, former leader of DeSUS, said in an interview that DeSUS is a failed party and that connecting with LIDE will not have a positive effect in the election. He was critical of the DeSUS MPs and Igor Zorčič, who did not support the vote of no confidence after which Erjavec would become prime minister. He added, that he might re-enter politics, but not through DeSUS, and that he has several offers from other parties. The LIDE party authorized party president Igor Zorčič to form a joint list of candidates with DeSUS and the LDS. Later LIDE announced that it would not participate in the election. DeSUS did not want broader coalition with other parties and therefore rejected an agreement offered by LIDE. LIDE's leader Igor Zorčič stated that party will skip parliamentary election and focus on presidential and local elections, which will be held later this year. DeSUS announced that it will run in the elections on its own after refusing to form a joint list with the LIDE.

The Commission for the Prevention of Corruption announced that it had not found any violations regarding the vacations of Prime Minister Janez Janša with some businessmen and stopped the investigation. After the investigation of the procurement of protective equipment in the initial phase of the COVID-19 pandemic, the Commission for the Prevention of Corruption (KPK) found a violation of the integrity by the Minister of the Economy Zdravko Počivalšek. Počivalšek stated that he will not resign and that the KPK's opinion tells more about the KPK itself. Robert Golob found himself under police investigation after he was accused of receiving too high a salary as a CEO of the state-owned GEN-I and therefore violating the so-called "Lahkovnik" Act, which regulates the salaries of management bodies of state-owned companies.

Speaker Igor Zorčič, former member of the Modern Centre Party, founded a new party called Liberal Democrats. Robert Golob, former State Secretary in the Ministry of Economy in Prime Minister Drnovšek's cabinet and CEO of GEN-i, was elected president of the Green Actions Party, renaming it to the Freedom Movement. Igor Zorčič announced that the Liberal Democrats will not form a coalition with the Freedom Movement, which was a mutual decision of both parties. Allegedly, Freedom Movement's leader Golob only offered Zorčič to be a candidate on his party's candidate list, and not a joint list. Whistleblower Ivan Gale became president of the Our Future party, and former European Commissioner Violeta Bulc was elected vice president. Smiljan Mekicar of Good Country party confirmed that they will form a joint list with Gale's Our Future party and some other parties and lists.

RTV Slovenia, the public broadcaster, rejected Freedom Movement's request to recognize them as a parliamentary party. RTV Slovenia recognized Aleksandra Pivec's Our Country party as a parliamentary party, which by law allows it to participate in electoral debates with other parliamentary parties. RTV Slovenia recognized Our Country as the successor to DeSUS, because Aleksandra Pivec was elected president of DeSUS, but then resigned and founded a new party, which was joined by several former members of DeSUS. According to RTV Slovenia, the situation was the same as in the case of the Alliance of Alenka Bratušek before the 2014 elections. Alenka Bratušek was elected president of Positive Slovenia, then resigned and founded a new party, which included several members of Positive Slovenia. RTV Slovenia granted the Alliance of Alenka Bratušek parliamentary status. Freedom Movement was granted parliamentary status after it won a suit against RTV Slovenia for political discrimination.

== Parties and coalitions ==
The following parties and lists have seats in the current National Assembly before the election:

| Party/List | | | Main ideology | Leader | Seats in the National Assembly | |
| Party/List | | | Main ideology | Leader | 2018 election | Before the 2022 election |
|---|---|---|---|---|---|---|
| SDS | Slovenian Democratic Party; Slovenska demokratska stranka | | National conservatism | Janez Janša | 25 / 90 | 26 / 90 |
| LMŠ | List of Marjan Šarec; Lista Marjana Šarca | | Social liberalism | Marjan Šarec | 13 / 90 | 14 / 90 |
| SD | Social Democrats; Socialni demokrati | | Social democracy | Tanja Fajon | 10 / 90 | 13 / 90 |
| Levica | The Left; Levica | | Democratic socialism | Luka Mesec | 9 / 90 | 7 / 90 |
| NSi | New Slovenia; Nova Slovenija | | Christian democracy | Matej Tonin | 7 / 90 | 7 / 90 |
| SAB | Party of Alenka Bratušek; Stranka Alenke Bratušek | | Social liberalism | Alenka Bratušek | 5 / 90 | 6 / 90 |
| DeSUS | Democratic Party of Pensioners of Slovenia; Demokratična stranka upokojencev Slovenije | | Pensioners' interests | Ljubo Jasnič | 5 / 90 | 4 / 90 |
| PoS | Let's Connect Slovenia; Povežimo Slovenijo | Concretely; Konkretno | Liberalism | Zdravko Počivalšek | 10 / 90 | 4 / 90 |
| PoS | Let's Connect Slovenia; Povežimo Slovenijo | Slovenian People's Party; Slovenska ljudska stranka | Conservatism | Marjan Podobnik | 0 / 90 | 0 / 90 |
| PoS | Let's Connect Slovenia; Povežimo Slovenijo | Greens of Slovenia; Zeleni Slovenije | Green conservatism | Andrej Čuš | 0 / 90 | 0 / 90 |
| PoS | Let's Connect Slovenia; Povežimo Slovenijo | New People's Party; Nova ljudska stranka | Conservatism | Željko Vogrin | 0 / 90 | 0 / 90 |
| PoS | Let's Connect Slovenia; Povežimo Slovenijo | New Social Democracy; Nova socialdemokracija | Christian socialism | Andrej Magajna | 0 / 90 | 0 / 90 |
| SNS | Slovenian National Party; Slovenska nacionalna stranka | | Nationalism | Zmago Jelinčič | 4 / 90 | 3 / 90 |
| GS | Freedom Movement; Gibanje svoboda | | Green liberalism | Robert Golob | New | 2 / 90 |
| ND | Our Country; Naša dežela | | Agrarianism | Aleksandra Pivec | New | 1 / 90 |

=== Other parties ===
List of non-parliamentary parties contesting the election
| Party/List | | | Ideology | Leader/s |
|---|---|---|---|---|
| Pirati | Pirate Party of Slovenia; Piratska stranka Slovenije | | Pirate politics | Boštjan Tavčar |
| Vesna | Vesna – Green Party; Vesna - zelena stranka | | Green politics | Urša Zgojznik & Uroš Macerl |
| Resni.ca | Tru.th; Resni.ca | | Populism | Zoran Stevanović |
| DOM | Homeland League; Domovinska liga | | Nationalism | Bernard Brščič |
| DD–NP | Good Country–Our Future joint list | Good Country (DD); Dobra država | Anti-corruption | Smiljan Mekicar |
| DD–NP | Good Country–Our Future joint list | Our Future (Slovenia); Naša prihodnost | | Ivan Gale |
| ZOS | Liberate Slovenia Alliance; Zavezništvo Osvobodimo Slovenijo | United Slovenia Movement (ZSi); Gibanje Zedinjena Slovenija | Nationalism | Andrej Šiško |
| ZOS | Liberate Slovenia Alliance; Zavezništvo Osvobodimo Slovenijo | People's Party of Labor (NSD); Narodna stranka dela | Nationalism | Marijan Poljšak |
| ZOS | Liberate Slovenia Alliance; Zavezništvo Osvobodimo Slovenijo | Aleksander Kamenik's Party (SAK); Stranka Aleksandra Kamenika | Animal rights | Aleksander Kamenik |
| ZOS | Liberate Slovenia Alliance; Zavezništvo Osvobodimo Slovenijo | Party of Slovenian People (SSN); Stranka Slovenskega naroda | Nationalism | Aleksander Zamuda |
| ZLS | For the People of Slovenia; Za ljudstvo Slovenije | | | Anica Bidar |

=== Parties that fulfill the criteria ===
| X | Constituency with submitted list of candidates |
| | Rejected list of candidates |

| Party/Alliance | | Leader | Support | Constituency | | | | | | | |
| Party/Alliance | | Leader | Support | 1 | 2 | 3 | 4 | 5 | 6 | 7 | 8 |
|---|---|---|---|---|---|---|---|---|---|---|---|
| NSi | New Slovenia - Christian Democrats; Nova Slovenija - Krščanski demokrati | Matej Tonin | 3 MPs | X | X | X | X | X | X | X | X |
| SNS | Slovenian National Party; Slovenska nacionalna stranka | Zmago Jelinčič Plemeniti | 3 MPs | X | X | X | X | X | X | X | X |
| DeSUS | Democratic Party of Pensioners of Slovenia; Demokratična stranka upokojencev Slovenije | Ljubo Jasnič | | X | X | X | X | X | X | X | X |
| RESNI.CA | Tru.th; Resni.ca | Zoran Stevanović | | X | X | X | X | X | X | X | X |
| SD | Social Democrats; Socialni demokrati | Tanja Fajon | 3 MPs | X | X | X | X | X | X | X | X |
| DOM | Homeland League; Domovinska liga | Bernard Brščič | | X | X | X | X | X | X | X | X |
| Pirati | Pirate Party of Slovenia; Piratska stranka Slovenije | Boštjan Tavčar | | X | X | X | X | X | X | X | X |
| ZLS | For the People of Slovenia; Za ljudstvo Slovenije | Anica Bidar | | X | X | X | X | X | X | X | X |
| ZZD | For a Healthy Society; Za zdravo družbo | Gregor Kos | | X | X | X | X | X | X | X | X |
| GS | Freedom Movement; Gibanje svoboda | Robert Golob | | X | X | X | X | X | X | X | X |
| ND | Our Land; Naša dežela | Aleksandra Pivec | | X | X | X | X | X | X | X | X |
| SAB | Party of Alenka Bratušek; Stranka Alenke Bratušek | Alenka Bratušek | 3 MPs | X | X | X | X | X | X | X | X |
| Levica | The Left; Levica | Luka Mesec | 3 MPs | X | X | X | X | X | X | X | X |
| LMŠ | List of Marjan Šarec; Lista Marjana Šarca | Marjan Šarec | 3 MPs | X | X | X | X | X | X | X | X |
| PoS | Let's Connect Slovenia; Povežimo Slovenijo | | 3 MPs | X | X | X | X | X | X | X | X |
| SDS | Slovenian Democratic Party; Slovenska demokratska stranka | Janez Janša | 3 MPs | X | X | X | X | X | X | X | X |
| VESNA | Spring – Green Party; Vesna - zelena stranka | Urša Zgojznik & Uroš Macerl | | X | X | X | X | X | X | X | X |
| ZOS | Alliance Let us Liberate Slovenia; Zavezništvo Osvobodimo Slovenijo | | | X | X | X | X | X | X | X | X |
| LBP | List Boris Popovič – Let's Digitalize Slovenia; Lista Borisa Popoviča – Digitalizirajmo Slovenijo | Boris Popovič | | X | X | X | X | X | X | X | X |
| NP–DD | Our Future and Good Country; Naša prihodnost in Dobra država | Smiljan Mekicar & Ivan Gale | | X | X | X | X | X | X | X | X |
| Provisional number of parties in the constituency | | | | 20 | 20 | 19 | 19 | 19 | 19 | 20 | 20 |
Source: Siol.net

== Opinion polls ==
Polls since the 2018 election

== Results ==
The turnout in the vote was 70%, according to the electoral commission. Experts said that was well above the national average. Peter Merše, a political analyst, said; "The biggest winner is of course the Freedom Movement. Slovenia is once again experimenting with new faces, with people we have hardly even heard of before." The voter turnout at early election, that took place from 19 to 21 April, was 7.67%, which was the record turnout for early voting both in election and referendums.

| Party | Votes | % | Seats | +/– |
|---|---|---|---|---|
| Freedom Movement | 410,769 | 34.45 | 41 | New |
| Slovenian Democratic Party | 279,897 | 23.48 | 27 | +2 |
| New Slovenia – Christian Democrats | 81,794 | 6.86 | 8 | +1 |
| Social Democrats | 79,709 | 6.69 | 7 | –3 |
| The Left | 53,234 | 4.46 | 5 | –4 |
| List of Marjan Šarec | 44,401 | 3.72 | 0 | –13 |
| Let's Connect Slovenia | 40,612 | 3.41 | 0 | –10 |
| Resni.ca | 34,107 | 2.86 | 0 | New |
| Party of Alenka Bratušek | 31,117 | 2.61 | 0 | –5 |
| For a Healthy Society | 21,021 | 1.76 | 0 | 0 |
| Our Future and Good State | 20,279 | 1.70 | 0 | 0 |
| Pirate Party | 19,480 | 1.63 | 0 | 0 |
| Our Country | 17,846 | 1.50 | 0 | New |
| Slovenian National Party | 17,736 | 1.49 | 0 | –4 |
| Vesna – Green Party | 16,089 | 1.35 | 0 | New |
| For the People of Slovenia | 8,340 | 0.70 | 0 | New |
| Democratic Party of Pensioners of Slovenia | 7,840 | 0.66 | 0 | –5 |
| List of Boris Popovič | 5,174 | 0.43 | 0 | New |
| Homeland League | 2,117 | 0.18 | 0 | New |
| Let's Liberate Slovenia (ZSi–SSN) | 563 | 0.05 | 0 | New |
| United Slovenia Movement | 168 | 0.01 | 0 | 0 |
| Italian and Hungarian national minorities | | | 2 | 0 |
| Total | 1,192,293 | 100.00 | 90 | 0 |
| Valid votes | 1,192,293 | 99.08 | | |
| Invalid/blank votes | 11,080 | 0.92 | | |
| Total votes | 1,203,373 | 100.00 | | |
| Registered voters/turnout | 1,695,796 | 70.96 | | |

=== Constituency results ===
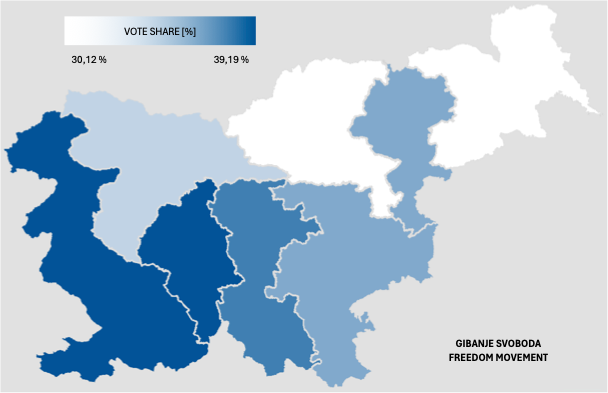
Freedom Movement

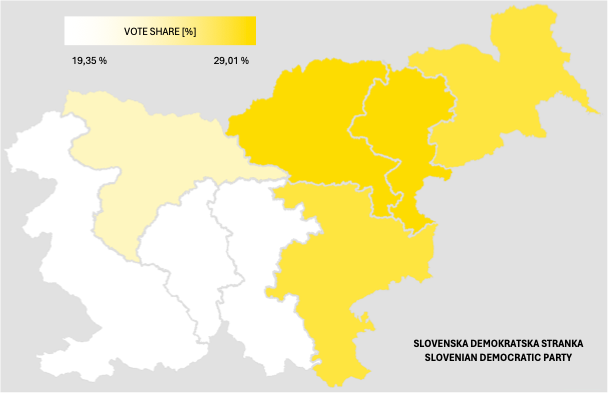
Slovenian Democratic Party

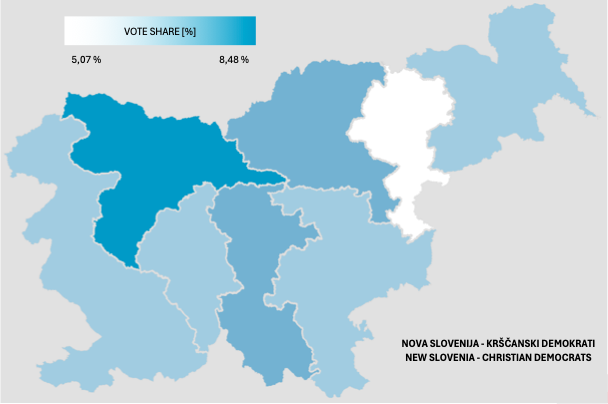
New Slovenia

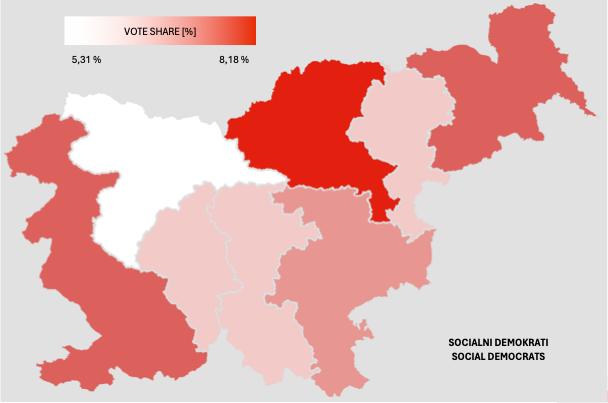
Social Democrats

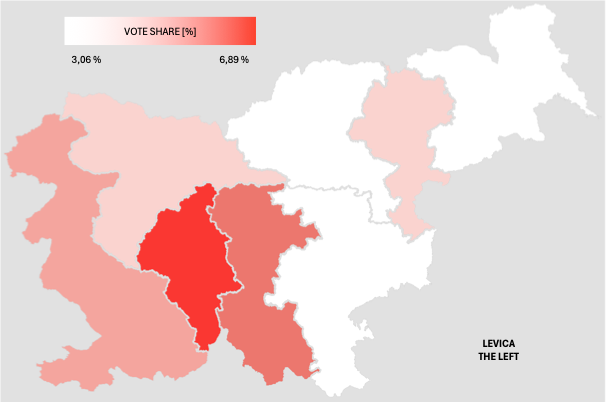
The Left

| Constituency | GS | | SDS | | NSi | | SD | | LEVICA | | Others | |
| Constituency | Votes | % | Votes | % | Votes | % | Votes | % | Votes | % | Votes | % |
|---|---|---|---|---|---|---|---|---|---|---|---|---|
| Celje | 46,410 | 30.85 | 41,017 | 27.27 | 11,026 | 7.33 | 12,307 | 8.18 | 4,786 | 3.18 | 34,886 | 23.18 |
| Kranj | 48.970 | 31.97 | 34,599 | 22.59 | 12,980 | 8.48 | 8,137 | 5.31 | 6,792 | 4.43 | 41,676 | 27.22 |
| Ljubljana Bežigrad | 55,818 | 36.64 | 32,120 | 21.08 | 11,357 | 7.45 | 9,419 | 6.18 | 8,391 | 5.51 | 35,245 | 23.14 |
| Ljubljana Center | 62,485 | 38.09 | 31,987 | 19.50 | 11,261 | 6.86 | 10,146 | 6.18 | 11,305 | 6.89 | 36,875 | 22.48 |
| Maribor | 47,996 | 34.26 | 35,157 | 25.09 | 7,104 | 5.07 | 8,577 | 6.12 | 5,571 | 3.98 | 35,695 | 25.48 |
| Novo Mesto | 51,652 | 33.96 | 37,662 | 24.76 | 9,891 | 6.50 | 10,408 | 6.84 | 5,348 | 3.52 | 37,128 | 24.42 |
| Postojna | 56,448 | 39.19 | 27,880 | 19.36 | 9,425 | 6.54 | 10,684 | 7.42 | 6,873 | 4.77 | 32,725 | 22.72 |
| Ptuj | 40,990 | 30.12 | 39,475 | 29.01 | 8,750 | 6.43 | 10,031 | 7.37 | 4,168 | 3.06 | 32,660 | 24.01 |
| Total | 410,769 | 34.45 | 279,897 | 23.48 | 81,794 | 6.86 | 79,709 | 6.69 | 53,234 | 4.46 | 286,890 | 24.06 |
Source: DVK

== Aftermath ==
The Freedom Movement led by Robert Golob, a former executive of a state-owned energy company, won 41 seats. It had campaigned on a transition to green energy, an open society and the rule of law. The Slovenian Democratic Party of incumbent prime minister Janez Janša finished second and won 27 seats. New Slovenia – Christian Democrats finished third and won 8 seats, followed by the Social Democrats with 7 seats and The Left with 5 seats. Golob, speaking to party headquarters via video link, declared victory and thanked his celebrating supporters for the historical turnout. On the other hand, prime minister Janša addressing his supporters conceded defeat and said: "The results are what they are. Congratulations to the relative winner." Luka Mesec, the coordinator of The Left, announced that he would offer to resign as the party coordinator.

In Slovenia, political analysts commented that many people voted for Golob because he was seen as the most likely candidate to win against Janša's government, and tactical voting took place. The result came at the expense of the two opposition parties, the List of Marjan Šarec and the Party of Alenka Bratušek, both of which failed to secure seats in the National Assembly. Freedom Movement won the highest number of seats for a single party in the elections since the independence of Slovenia. The number of parties that won seats (five) was the smallest elected to the legislature in the same time period; for comparison, nine parties were elected in 2018. Commentators mentioned that Golob, previously a successful businessman, is a newcomer to the office, and that there are still several unknowns about the party priorities. They also mentioned that he may lack qualified people to take the offices. Luka Lisjak Gabrijelčič of Delo saw the result more like a defeat for Janša than a win for Golob, and added that the election in Slovenia would be internationally seen as a footnote in the fight against right-wing populism, as the world was mostly focused on the bigger election of the day, the 2022 French presidential election.

International media saw the relative victory of the Freedom Movement as a defeat of right-wing populism of Janša's government, and commented that Janša was a supporter of the former US president Donald Trump and an ally of Hungary's Prime Minister Viktor Orbán. In Croatia, the news portal Index commented that Golob embodies the values of the late Prime Minister and President Janez Drnovšek, and that a scenario where a political newcomer wins the election cannot happen in Croatia.

In order to form a government, Euronews reported that Freedom Movement is expected to form a coalition with "smaller centre-left groups". Prior to election, Golob suggested that he could cooperate with the existing opposition parties. Both Social Democrats and The Left lost seats but were considered likely coalition partners, with possible collaboration with the List of Marjan Šarec and the Party of Alenka Bratušek discussed prior to the elections as well. In early reactions, Golob stated that he does not exclude working with the Slovenian Democratic Party and New Slovenia on some projects, but added that the projects requiring a constitutional majority are not the top priority at the moment. After meeting with Golob two days after the election, President Borut Pahor stated that he planned to appoint a new government led by Golob in late May, with coalition talks with the Social Democrats and The Left due to start the week after the meeting.

On 11 May, Robert Golob told reporters that the Freedom Movement had agreed to form a government with both the Social Democrats and The Left, with the goal of creating a cabinet of "experienced personalities and enthusiastic experts". On 25 May, the National Assembly voted in Robert Golob as the new prime minister, heading the 15th Government of Slovenia. His cabinet ministers were later sworn in on 1 June.
