= List of political parties in Slovenia =

This article lists political parties in Slovenia. Since 1989, Slovenia has a multi-party system with numerous political parties, in which one party rarely has a chance of gaining power alone, and parties must work with each other forming coalitions.

== Parliamentary parties ==
| Party | | Ideology | Leader | Seats | MEPs |
|---|---|---|---|---|---|
| GS | Freedom Movement; Gibanje Svoboda | Social liberalism; Pro-Europeanism | Robert Golob | 29 / 90 | 2 / 9 |
| SDS | Slovenian Democratic Party; Slovenska demokratska stranka | Slovenian nationalism; Right-wing populism | Janez Janša | 28 / 90 | 4 / 9 |
| NSi | New Slovenia – Christian Democrats; Nova Slovenija - Krščanski demokrati | Christian democracy; Social conservativism | Jernej Vrtovec | 7 / 90 | 1 / 9 |
| SD | Social Democrats; Socialni demokrati | Social democracy; Pro-Europeanism | Matjaž Han | 6 / 90 | 1 / 9 |
| D. | Anže Logar’s Democrats. Demokrati. Anžeta Logarja | Conservative liberalism; Anti-corruption | Anže Logar | 6 / 90 | 0 / 9 |
| Levica | The Left; Levica | Democratic socialism; Left-wing populism; Soft Euroscepticism | Asta Vrečko | 5 / 90 | 0 / 9 |
| Resni.ca | Resni.ca | Right-wing populism; Euroscepticism; Anti-vaccine activism | Zoran Stevanović | 5 / 90 | 0 / 9 |
| SLS | Slovenian People's Party; Slovenska ljudska stranka | Conservatism; Agrarianism; Pro-Europeanism | Tina Bregant | 1 / 90 | 0 / 9 |
| Fokus | FOCUS of Marko Lotrič; FOKUS Marka Lotriča | Conservatism | Marko Lotrič | 1 / 90 | 0 / 9 |
| Prerod | Rebirth; Prerod | Social liberalism; Pro-Europeanism | Vladimir Prebilič | 0 / 90 | 1 / 9 |

== Extra-parliamentary parties ==
| Party name | | Main ideology | Leader | Last Election |
|---|---|---|---|---|
| Vesna | Vesna – Green Party; Vesna – zelena stranka | Green politics | Uroš Macerl; Urška Zgojznik | 2026 |
| Pirati | Pirate Party of Slovenia; Piratska stranka Slovenije | Pirate politics Freedom of information | Jasmin Feratović | 2026 |
| SNS | Slovenian National Party; Slovenska nacionalna stranka | Ultranationalism; Hard Euroscepticism | Zmago Jelinčič | 2026 |
| MI! | We, Socialists! Mi, socialisti! | Socialism; Anti-capitalism | Miha Kordiš | 2026 |
| SG | Party of Generations; Stranka generacij | Liberalism; Pro-Europeanism | Darinka Mravljak | 2026 |
| Zeleni | Greens of Slovenia; Zeleni Slovenije | Populism; Green politics | Andrej Čuš | 2026 |
| ZD | For a Healthy Society; Za zdravo družbo | Single-issue politics; Anti-corruption | Jure Pogačnik | 2026 |
| NOT | None of This; Nič od tega | | Violeta Tomić | 2026 |
| Sloga | Unity; Sloga | Liberalism | Janko Veber | 2026 |
| SUS | Solution – Party of Pensioners Velenje; Rešitev - Stranka Upokojencev Velenje, Slovenija | Pensioners' interests | Faruk Pijuković | 2026 |
| NS | New Social Democracy; Novi socialdemokrati | Christian socialism; Social democracy | Andrej Magajna | 2022 |
| SNP | Our Future; Naša prihodnost | Environmentalism | Ivan Gale | 2022 |
| ND | Our Country; Naša Dežela | Centrism; Agrarianism | Aleksandra Pivec | 2022 |
| ZLS | For the People of Slovenia; Za ljudstvo Slovenije | | Borut Loboda | 2022 |
| LBP | List of Boris Popovič; Lista Borisa Popoviča | Digital transformation | Boris Popovič | 2022 |
| ZSi | United Slovenia Movement; Gibanje Zedinjena Slovenija | Slovenian nationalism; Populism | Andrej Šiško | 2022 |
| SSN | Party of Slovenian People; Stranka slovenskega naroda | Direct democracy Soft euroscepticism | Mihael Jarc | 2022 |
| LNBP | List of Journalist Bojan Požar; Lista novinarja Bojana Požarja | Anti-elitism; Populism | Bojan Požar | 2018 |
| SPS | Socialist Party of Slovenia; Socialistična partija Slovenije | Marxism-Leninism; Socialism | Tadej Trček | 2018 |
| NPS | Forward Slovenia; Naprej Slovenija | Slovenian nationalism; Populism | Blaž Svetek | 2018 |
| GOD | Voice for Children and Families; Glas za otroke in družine | Christian democracy; Social conservativism | Aleš Primc | 2018 |
| LDS | Liberal Democracy of Slovenia; Liberalna demokracija Slovenije | Liberalism Social liberalism | Jadranka Železnik | 2011 |
| ZZP | Alliance for Primorska; Zveza za Primorsko | Regionalism | Oton Mozetič | 2011 |
| SMS | Youth Party – European Greens; Stranka mladih – Zeleni Evrope | Green politics | Igor Jurišič | 2011 |
| KNS | The Guard - Catholic National Party; Stranka Straža, Katoliška narodna stranka | Ultraconservatism; Euroscepticism | Alen Koman | Did not participate |
| Volt | Volt Slovenia; Volt Slovenija | European federalism Progressivism | Borja Ranzinger | Did not participate |

== Historical parties ==
- Slovene People's Party (1892–1945), conservative
- National Progressive Party (1894–1919), liberal
- Yugoslav Social-Democratic Party (1898–1919), left-wing
- Independent Agrarian Party (1919–1926), liberal / agrarian
- Slovene Peasant Party (1926–1929), centre-right / agrarian
- League of Communists / Communist Party (1937–1990), left-wing to far-left
- Union of Reform Forces (1989–1990), centre to centre-left
- Slovene Christian Democrats (1989–2000), centre-right to right-wing
- Slovenian Democratic Union (1989–1993), centrist and liberal
- Socialist Party of Slovenia (1990–1993), centre-left
- Democratic Party of Slovenia (1992–2007), centrist
- Party of Slovenian People (1994–2008), right-wing to far-right
- Slovenia is Ours (2004–2011), centrist / regionalist
- Active Slovenia (2004–2007), centrist and liberal
- Zares – Social Liberals (2007–2015), centre to centre-left
- Initiative for Democratic Socialism (2014–2017), left-wing to far-left
- United Left - Democratic Party of Labor (2014–2017), left-wing
- Gregor Virant's Civic List (2011–2018), centre to centre-right
- Modern Centre Party (2014–2021), centre to centre-left
- List of Marjan Šarec (2014–2022), centre to centre-left
- Party of Alenka Bratušek (2014–2022), centre to centre-left
- Verjamem (2014–2022), centre-left
- Democratic Party of Slovenia (1994–2023), centrist
- Homeland League (2019–2023), far-right
- New People's Party of Slovenia (2016–2023), centre-right
- Voice of the women of Slovenia (2000-2023), centre-left / feminist
- Civic List (2011–2024), centre to centre-right
- Positive Slovenia (2011–2024), centre to centre-left
- Concretely (2021–2025), centre
- Democratic Party of Pensioners of Slovenia (1991–2025), centre
- Good State (2017–2025), centre
- Liberal Democrats (2022–2025), centre to centre-left
- Pavel Rupar's Voice of Pensioners (2024-2026), centre-right

== See also ==
- Politics of Slovenia
- List of political parties by country to browse parties by country
