= Parties in the European Council during 2018 =

This article describes the party affiliations of leaders of each member state represented in the European Council during the year 2018. The list below gives the political party that each head of government, or head of state, belongs to at the national level, as well as the European political alliance to which that national party belongs. The states are listed from most to least populous. More populous states have greater influence in the council, in accordance with the qualified majority system.

== Summary ==
Party	1 January 2018		1 June		2 June	
Party	#	Pop.%	#	Pop.%	#	Pop.%
European People's Party	11	37.48%	11	37.48%	10	28.38%
Alliance of Liberals and Democrats for Europe Party	7	9.55%	7	9.55%	7	9.55%
Party of European Socialists	5	16.95%	4	5.15%	5	14.25%
Alliance of European Conservatives and Reformists	2	20.32%	2	20.32%	2	20.32%
Party of the European Left	1	2.10%	1	2.10%	1	2.10%
Independent	2	13.66%	3	25.46%	3	25.46%

== List of leaders (1 January 2018) ==
Member state	Pop.%	Leader	Party
Germany	16.16%	Angela Merkel	CDU-EPP
France	13.11%	Emmanuel Macron	LREM-NI
United Kingdom	12.91%	Theresa May	Con-AECR
Italy	11.80%	Paolo Gentiloni	PD-PES
Spain	9.10%	Mariano Rajoy	PP-EPP
Poland	7.41%	Mateusz Morawiecki	PiS-EACR
Romania	3.84%	Klaus Iohannis	Ind. (Note: Supported by PNL)-EPP
Netherlands	3.34%	Mark Rutte	VVD-ALDE
Belgium	2.23%	Charles Michel	MR-ALDE
Greece	2.10%	Alexis Tsipras	SYRIZA-PEL
Czech Republic	2.07%	Andrej Babiš	ANO-ALDE
Portugal	2.01%	António Costa	PS-PES
Sweden	1.97%	Stefan Löfven	S-PES
Hungary	1.91%	Viktor Orbán	Fidesz-EPP
Austria	1.72%	Sebastian Kurz	ÖVP-EPP
Bulgaria	1.38%	Boyko Borisov	GERB-EPP
Denmark	1.13%	Lars Løkke Rasmussen	V-ALDE
Finland	1.08%	Alexander Stubb	Kok.-EPP
Slovakia	1.06%	Robert Fico	SMER-SD-PES
Ireland	0.94%	Leo Varadkar	FG-EPP
Croatia	0.80%	Andrej Plenković	HDZ-EPP
Lithuania	0.55%	Dalia Grybauskaitė	Ind.
Slovenia	0.40%	Miro Cerar	SMC-ALDE
Latvia	0.38%	Māris Kučinskis	V-EPP
Estonia	0.26%	Jüri Ratas	K-ALDE
Cyprus	0.17%	Nicos Anastasiades	DISY-EPP
Luxembourg	0.12%	Xavier Bettel	DP-ALDE
Malta	0.09%	Joseph Muscat	PL-EPP

== Changes ==
Date	State	Former		Newer	
Date	State	Leader	Party	Leader	Party
22 March	Slovakia	Robert Fico	SMER-SD-PES	Peter Pellegrini	SMER-SD-PES
1 June	Italy	Paolo Gentiloni	PD-PES	Giuseppe Conte	Ind.
2 June	Spain	Mariano Rajoy	PP-EPP	Pedro Sánchez	PSOE-PES
13 September	Slovenia	Miro Cerar	SMC-ALDE	Marjan Šarec	LMŠ-ALDE

== See also ==
- Presidency of the Council of the European Union
