= Demokracija =

Slovenian weekly news and political magazine

- Categories: News and political magazine
- Frequency: Weekly
- First issue: 1 January 1990; 36 years ago
- Country: Slovenia
- Based in: Ljubljana
- Language: Slovene
- Website: Demokracija
- ISSN: 1408-0494
- OCLC: 21211770

Demokracija is a Slovenian right-wing weekly news and political magazine published in Ljubljana, Slovenia. It is known as the party magazine of the Slovenian Democratic Party. It has been in circulation since 1990.

== History and profile ==
Demokracija was founded in January 1990 as a dissident and pro-Spring magazine. The magazine is published weekly on Thursdays. Its headquarters is in Ljubljana.

Demokracija has a right-wing and conservative stance. In its early days the weekly was considered to be close to the Slovenian Democratic Union. Then it is considered to have links with the Slovenian Democratic Party.

The magazine focuses on political news in Slovenia and in the world, but also covers sections about history, culture, film, sports and entertainment.

In July 2017, Ripost, a Hungarian media company, acquired a majority share in Demokracija's parent company, Nova obzorja. Ripost has deep ties to the ruling political party in Hungary and Prime Minister Viktor Orbán. The Slovenian Democratic Party has retained a 42% share in the parent company. Ripost is also a significant shareholder in another media company tied to SDS, Nova24TV.

In June 2024 Russia blocked Demokracija as part of a wider blockade of European media. In response Demokracija stated, that Russia has a problem with their reporting about the Russian invasion of Ukraine.

== See also ==
- List of magazines in Slovenia
