= Igor Zorčič =

Slovenian politician

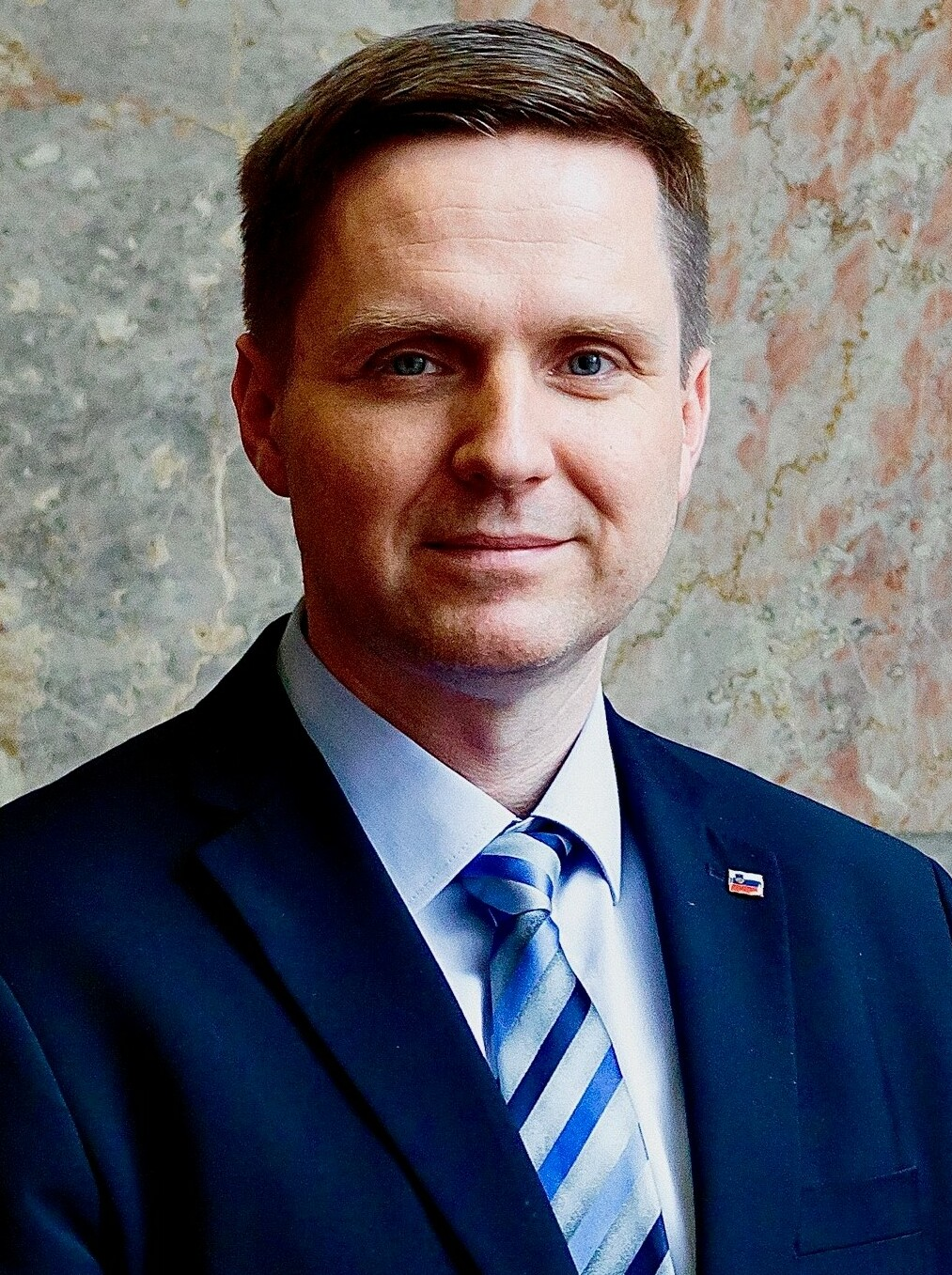
- Zorčič in 2020

Speaker of the National Assembly of Slovenia
- In office 5 March 2020 – 13 May 2022
- Preceded by: Dejan Židan
- Succeeded by: Urška Klakočar Zupančič

Member of the National Assembly of Slovenia
- In office 13 July 2014 – 13 May 2022

Personal details
- Born: 9 January 1978 (age 48) Brežice, SR Slovenia, Yugoslavia (now Slovenia)
- Party: Liberal Democrats (2021–); Modern Centre Party (2014–2021)
- Education: University of Ljubljana

Igor Zorčič (born 9 January 1978) is a Slovenian politician who was Speaker of the National Assembly of Slovenia from 2020 to 2022.

== Biography ==
A lawyer by profession, Zorčič entered the Party of Miro Cerar in 2014 and was elected MP in 2014 and 2018. Following the restructuring of the cabinet after the resignation of Marjan Šarec as the Prime Minister in January 2020, Zorčič got elected Speaker of the National Assembly on 5 March 2020.

By the beginning of 2021, Zorčič left SMC. On 31 March 2021, SDS-led coalition tried to replace him as the Speaker of Assembly, but this attempt was unsuccessful.

Preceded by Dejan Židan	Speaker of the National Assembly of Slovenia; 2020 – 22	Succeeded by Urška Klakočar Zupančič
