= Liberal Democrats (Slovenia) =

Liberal Democrats Liberalni demokrati
- Abbreviation: LIDE
- Leader: Igor Zorčič
- Founder: Igor Zorčič
- Founded: 12 January 2022
- Split from: Modern Centre Party
- Ideology: Liberalism; Pro-Europeanism
- Political position: Centre to centre-left
- National affiliation: LIDE-DeSUS-LDS
- Colours: Blue
- National Assembly: 0 / 90

Website
- lide.si

The Liberal Democrats (Slovene: Liberalni demokrati; LIDE) was a centrist to centre-left Slovenian political party. It was founded on 12 January 2022 by the then speaker of the National Assembly of Slovenia, Igor Zorčič.

== History ==
On March 26, 2021, Igor Zorčič, speaker of the National Assembly of the Republic of Slovenia, with MPs Janja Sluga and Branislav Rajić withdrew from the Modern Centre Party and co-founded a parliamentary group of unaffiliated deputies. Since then, possible transfers to other parties have been mentioned several times. At the end of 2021, Zorčič announced a new liberal political party.

The inaugural congress took place on Wednesday, 12 January 2022, in Ljubljana. Igor Zorčič was elected president, but at the time of its establishment it was determined that there could be a maximum of three presidents at a time. They also set out the party's abstract program.

On 15 February 2022, the leadership of the Democratic Party of Pensioners of Slovenia (DeSUS) supported a joint participation in the 2022 parliamentary election with the LIDE party. As of 2025 the party doesn't exist anymore and didn't participate in any of the elections.

== Party leadership ==
- Chairman: Igor Zorčič
- Party Council: Štefan Skalar, Ivan Backovič, Eva Omerza, Marko Veselič, Stanko Tomše, Andrejka Ribnikar, Aleksander Pahor, Roman Dobnikar, David Dremelj, Lana Gobec
