= Nova24TV =

Slovenian television network and website

- Country: Slovenia
- Broadcast area: Slovenia
- Headquarters: Linhartova cesta 13; Ljubljana

Programming
- Language: Slovene

Ownership
- Owner: NovaTV24.si, d. d., Nova hiša d.o.o.

History
- Launched: March 1, 2016; 10 years ago

Links
- Website: http://nova24tv.si/

Nova24TV
- Website type: Politics; News and opinion Tabloid
- Available in: Slovene, English
- Owners: NovaTV24.si, d. d., Nova hiša d.o.o.
- Editor: Jože Biščak
- Website: http://nova24tv.si
- Launched: October 15, 2015; 10 years ago

Nova24TV is a Slovenian right-wing news media conglomerate operating an eponymous news television channel and online news portal. Nova24TV was founded by members and supporters of the Slovenian Democratic Party. The news media organisation's stated mission is to provide an alternative perspective that reflects the values of the European right.

The current editor-in-chief of Nova24TV is Marko Puš, with Boris Tomašič serving as director. Past editors-in-chief have included Uroš Urbanija, Miro Petek, Jože Biščak, and Boris Tomašič. Former directors include Aleš Hojs, and Damjan Damjanovič. Nova24TV generates a significant portion of its revenues through advertising for companies that are partially or majority state-owned. Nova24TV had also obtained over €120.000 of various public funds by the first half of 2020. Nova24TV was backed by Hungarian businessmen close to the Prime Minister of Hungary Viktor Orbán, but the Hungarian share was sold, allegedly to a member of SDS, in July 2022.

Nova24TV has been described as a far-right news organisation. In August 2022, Marko Milosavljević, Chair of Journalism at the Faculty of Social Sciences in Ljubljana, opined that Nova24TV was not a true media but a party newsletter and the journalists working there were not true journalists but party propaganda workers. In December 2022, Nova24TV was characterised as "one of the major sources of disinformation in Slovenia" by the fact-checking portal Oštro.

== Overview ==
According to its own reporting from 2019, Nova24TV was the 5th most frequently visited website in Slovenia. Nova24TV articles were - according to reporting from 2021 - by far the most frequently shared content on Twitter of any Slovenian news media website. On the other hand, the articles were shared by a relatively small number of users leading to suspicions that Nova24TV's content was being promoted by a group of highly active astroturfed fake accounts.

== History ==
Plans to create a media company were first made public by Slovenian Democratic Party leader and former prime minister Janez Janša at a meeting of senior party members in mid-2015. The media company was established on 7 Jul 2015, after ensuring sufficient capital. Initial investments were made by individuals committed to the project (mostly SDS members and individuals associated with the party). Additional funding was to be obtained by sales of shares.

The launch of the media company was fraught with issues. Broadcasting of the Nova24TV television channel was initially scheduled to commence in December 2015, but the launch was subsequently postponed several times. The media company is also allegedly plagued by internal conflicts and lacks skilled technicians and other staff, which has led to broadcasting issues. The company was also met with difficulties when attempting to launch its radio station.

In August 2020, the contents of Nova24TV's web server were published on the internet by Anonymous. Among the data were the e-mail addresses and IP addresses of Nova24TV website commenters (constituting a possible violation of personal data privacy laws by Nova24TV), and a list of site administrators along with their e-mails and hashed passwords. Nova24TV responded that no server breach had occurred, that Anonymous obtained an old website archival copy, and that the released data were doctored. Nova24TV labelled the released data as "merely trash".

In March 2021, Nova24TV invited Slovenian elementary schools and high schools to participate in a Slovene history knowledge competition which Nova24TV was organising in collaboration with the Association for the Values of Slovenian Independence (the latter organisation - like Nova24TV itself - is also associated with SDS). The invitation - which was addressed to school principals - was signed by an SDS MP, interior minister Aleš Hojs, and Nova24TV director Tomašič. The competition is also intended to promote patriotism. The three top ranking participants would receive cash rewards, with finishing in first place also being awarded a trip to the European Parliament where they would meet with SDS MEP and former Slovene education minister Milan Zver. A book edited by serving PM Janez Janša and published by an SDS-affiliated publishing company was listed as supplemental study material for the competition.

== Content ==
Nova24TV offers coverage and content with an explicit right-wing perspective. Coverage of economic issues is often critical of the welfare state, state ownership of enterprises, the public sector and public healthcare, and advocates free-market capitalism. Anti-immigration and anti-Islamic content is common. Coverage of international politics is often favourable to right-wing politicians, such as Donald Trump and Viktor Orbán, the latter having granted Nova24TV an exclusive interview. Many news articles regarding international issues are based on articles originally published by Breitbart News, the Daily Mail, The Daily Caller, Bild, and other right-wing news media organisations. Fox News served as an inspiration and blueprint for the creation of Nova24TV. Nova24TV has aired advertisements for Generation Identity during its broadcasts.

== Financing ==
Nova24TV began to struggle to procure sufficient funding for its operations shortly after its inception. The startup capital obtained by the sale of shares to individual investors was assumed to be sufficient for two years of continuous operations, however, by late summer of 2016 (less than a year since the commencement of operations), the company was in need of additional funds. Company chairman Aleš Hojs stated that instead of seeking funding from existing shareholders, the company will seek to attract a strategic partner, preferably a European company with expertise in managing media. Hojs also stated that they will remain committed to the rule that no single shareholder can own more than 20% of stock in the company. Miro Petek, then Nova24TV's editor-in-chief, allegedly met with Italian media executives associated with former Italian prime minister, Silvio Berlusconi, to seek financial support. When asked to comment, Petek declined to answer.

Restructuring the Nova24TV television broadcaster in a way that would allow easier access to public financing was also considered (with the possibility of government co-financing of up to 50% of project costs), however, such a move would deprive shareholders of returns on investment as the TV broadcaster would need to become a non-profit entity.

An article published by Svet24 claimed that by early 2017, though initially offered decent wages, many employees and contributors worked for minimum wages or even volunteered to work without pay. Efforts to establish a radio station were also soon abandoned; the radio had briefly broadcast online, but attracted few listeners.

Financing from Hungarian companies

The financial woes of Nova24TV were partially alleviated after three Hungarian media companies (all with close ties to the Hungarian prime minister Viktor Orbán and his party) bailed out Nova24TV to the amount of €800,000, and purchased, in total, 45.44% of the company's shares. The owners of nearly half of NovaTV24.si shares were, however, still undisclosed. In April 2018, Hungarian investors again bailed out Nova24TV's holding companies with some €800,000 in additional capital, possibly with the aim of indirectly and surreptitiously contributing funds for SDS's electoral efforts. The ownership share of Hungary-based companies in Nova24TV eventually rose to nearly 88%.

In a series of investigative media reports published in early 2020, it was revealed that Hungarian businesses operated by people close to Hungarian PM Orbán transferred at least €4M to or through Slovenia since August 2018, of which €1.5M was used to finance Nova24TV (adding up to €3,5M in total over the lifetime of the media company) while the rest was then funneled into North Macedonia (either €2,5M or over €3,2M in total). The funds were transferred through Great Britain, and some of the money may have originated from Russian investments in Hungary, and was used to finance similar media operations of political allies of the Hungarian government in North Macedonia. The money was transferred between countries and companies under the cover of questionable advertising contracts. A money laundering investigation and parliamentary session launched in Slovenia to look into the revelations. An investigation into potential Hungarian money laundering based on information obtained by Slovene police was already launched by Macedonian authorities in 2018.

Advertising revenues

Nova24TV receives a significant portion of its income from advertising revenues (mostly by publishing ads for Telekom Slovenije, Petrol, Merkator, Slovenske železnice and Telemach). Most companies advertising with Nova24TV are state-owned or are to a large degree co-owned by the state.

Nova24TV has also received advertising revenues from an Austrian construction company Belfry that mostly operates in Hungary. The company did not conduct any business operations in Slovenia while advertising in Nova24TV. The owners of the company had ties with Hungarian PM Orbán.

Public funds

In 2019, Nova24TV received €21,120 in public funds through a Ministry of Culture grant. According to data from the first half of 2020, Nova24TV had received a sum total of over €120.000 of various public funds. Among the largest contributors/customers were Slovenske železnice (some €37.000), the Ministry of Culture (some €21.000), Grosuplje municipality (some €13.000), the Public Agency for Transit Safety (some €12.000) and RTV Slovenija (some €10.000).

== Criticism and controversies ==
=== Anti-Semitism accusations ===
During an interview on Nova24TV, economist and former state secretary in Janša's cabinet, Bernard Brščič, stated that the "alleged" Holocaust is a ploy by Jews intended to cause collective guilt so that a "multicultural dystopia" could be established. The comments drew widespread condemnation from the public sphere, including the International Holocaust Remembrance Alliance, and the director of the Slovenian Jewish Cultural Centre, Robert Waltl, who said he would press charges (Holocaust denial is a classified as a hate crime in the Slovenian criminal code). Nova24TV's editor-in-chief, Miro Petek, stated that the media company is intended to present readers with a multitude of different points of view. The Nova24TV news portal later republished a blog post arguing that the Holocaust is a historic fabrication and that the Second World War was caused by Jewish bankers so that Jews could be martyred to facilitate the establishment of a Jewish state, while describing the public condemnation of Brščič as a "pogrom". The blog, Kavarna Hayek, which was regularly republished by Nova24TV, is speculated to have been operated and penned by Jože Biščak who later went on to become the editor-in-chief of both Nova24TV and Demokracija (the SDS party newspaper). The news portal has also published multiple articles regarding the alleged surreptitious and sinister influence of George Soros (a regular target of anti-Semitic conspiracy theories) on world and local Slovenian politics.

=== False reporting ===
In November 2017, Nova24TV published an online report alleging that a Romani child raped a fellow student in the bathroom of a Ribnica elementary school. The report further alleged that the principal of the school attempted to prevent the information from going public by demanding silence from school officials and even the police, and that there had been multiple crimes committed on school grounds in the past, mostly by Roma children whom the school leadership treated with leniency. The story was based on information provided by a reader. The report was harshly rebuked as false by representatives of the school, Ljubljana police department, and Ribnica municipality. Police did indeed intervene on school grounds due to a report of a criminal offence involving two minors, however, all parties with knowledge of the event denied that any form of sexual assault had taken place. Further details could not be disclosed due to privacy protection rules regarding minors. A school representative stated that the incident represented an isolated event and was not indicative of a systemic problem. Nova24TV later retracted the story and published a correction.

In July 2018, Nova24TV, citing "reliable sources", reported that a "group of migrants sexually assaulted two underage Slovene women", going on to claim that the incident supposedly ended with some of the migrants raping the pair. The incident allegedly took place at the autonomous alternative culture centre Metelkova. The report goes on to state that though the incident was not reported to the police, their claims were "verified by Metelkova", and that "this sadly is not an isolated case, however, the mainstream media often goes to great lengths not to report on incidents committed by migrants". Other media organisations were unable to independently verify the claims made in the Nova24TV report. After the publication of the Nova24TV article, police investigated whether any crimes had been committed, but learnt that no Metelkova administrator had confirmed the claims (contrary to what the original reporting alleged). Police also sought information regarding possible crimes in the field at the location itself, but to no avail.

==== Migrant debit cards ====
On October 30, 2018, Nova24TV published an article claiming that the European Union was supplying "illegal Muslim migrants" stranded in Bosnia and Herzegovina with Mastercard bank cards bearing the logos of the EU and UNHCR with blank name fields. The article also implied the money may be being used for purchases of "machetes and knives", and listed "social network users", "local residents", and "a local police officer who spoke to the kamenjar.com web portal" as sources.

In the days following publication, the article was picked up by multiple foreign news websites. The German political blog Pi News speculated whether the cards were being financed by George Soros, with the Pi News article in turn summarised in a Nova24TV article published on November 5, combined with boasting about Nova24TV's global reach.

By mid-November, the articles alleging Soros is financing migrant debit cards had in turn also spread internationally, republished by fringe news websites. The articles listed Nova24TV as the original source of the claim. The claim was addressed by PolitiFact and Snopes.com with both fact-checking sites rating it as false. The story was also flagged as part of Facebook's campaign to combat false news and misinformation. George Soros' spokesperson denied the allegation in an email to PolitiFact.

=== Defamatory reporting ===
Nova24TV has been criticised for alleged defamatory and misleading reporting about individuals.

==== Defamation lawsuit ====
In August 2017, Nova24TV published paparazzi-style photos of Violeta Tomić, an MP of Slovenian political party, The Left (then United Left), surreptitiously taken during a ferry ride while Tomić was on vacation. One of the photo depicted her sitting with spread legs. The photos were published under the headline "Not at all Ladylike: United Left Member of Parliament Violeta Tomić was 'Airing It' in Short-Shorts on a Ferry Heading for Vis". The article goes on to state that Tomić "is not known in parliament neither for elegant clothing nor ladylike behaviour", and that "it is not proper for an MP of her age to parade around in such high-cut shorts". The article further states that the photos were taken by a "reader", who was "shocked" when the MP sat up in such a way as to reveal "the inside of her thighs and more for all to see ... [The reader] Sarcastically added: 'Maybe she had to ventilate it.'" The article also contained snide remarks about her only being accompanied by her dog, and her putative flirtations with men on the ferry.

In a lawsuit brought against Nova24TV over the article by Tomić, the Ljubljana local court ruled that the publication of the photos themselves does not constitute an encroachment upon Tomić's right to privacy, despite having been shot without her authorisation or prior knowledge, and while on vacation abroad, as she is a public figure, being an actress as well as a politician. However, the court ruled that the text contained in the article constitutes defamation, as do some of the comments published under the article, which the court ruled must be removed by the news portal. The court furthermore found that the author of the article intended to "devalue" the plaintiff who is of a different political orientation as the author, and mainly wished to "create an image" of the plaintiff as unfit to serve as MP. The malicious intent of the article was furthermore evidenced by the negative anonymous comments it evoked. The court ruled Nova24TV is to pay €6,000 in damages to Tomić, and ordered Nova24TV to issue a public apology.

Commenting on the ruling, a Nova24TV representative stated they consider the ruling wholly unjustified and a grave infringement against freedom of speech, and that they will appeal the ruling, including up to the European Court of Human Rights, if need be.

The article that was the basis for the lawsuit was not the only instance of Nova24TV making disparaging comments regarding Tomić's age and appearance, however. In January 2018, Nova24TV published another article, entitled "What's Happening with Violeta Tomić? Even Makeup Can No Longer Hide Her Eye Circles", which made numerous allusions to Tomić's appearance, extensively noting that she looks very old for her age, focusing explicitly on "black circles under her eyes, ashen-white skin, and loose skin on her neck, which she is always quick to hide with a scarf", implying she has a drinking problem, and concluding "like without, like within". After Tomić posted on her personal Facebook profile complaining that someone attempted to take photographs of her crotch with a telephoto lens-equipped camera while she was basking in a bathing suit by a river during the summer, Nova24TV published an article soliciting the photographs and even offering monetary compensation, stating that it will not be discouraged by "political pressures", alluding to the lawsuit it lost only months prior.

=== SDS electoral campaign bypass financing ===
Less than a week before the 2018 Slovenian parliamentary election, news reports revealed that SDS-affiliated media companies - including Nova24TV - received some €800,000 in bailouts from two Hungarian nationals (or, rather, their companies) just months before the election (bringing the total amount SDS-affiliated media companies received from Hungarian entities to over €2.2M). Both individuals had close ties to Hungarian president Viktor Orbán. These SDS-affiliated media companies than purchased campaign ads for SDS.

== Political ties ==
Though asserting itself as an independent news media company, Nova24TV has deep ties to the largest party in the Slovenian parliament, the Slovenian Democratic Party, with many of its co-founders also members of the party. The plans to create a new media company were first made public when the party's leader, Janez Janša, voiced the party's support for the project. As the name of the project was revealed only later, it was often referred to as Janša TV by the media until the official name was announced. During the media company's formation, two thirds of SDS members of parliament were also co-founders (stakeholders) in the company. Nova24TV shares offices with those of other SDS media projects. The director of Nova24TV was appointed Minister of the Interior after SDS formed a coalition government in 2020 while a Nova24TV journalist was appointed MP. After becoming prime minister in early 2020, Janez Janša, who had co-founded and co-owned Nova24TV, began regularly appearing in a dedicated weekly call-in talk program on the Nova24TV channel. The weekly program has been promoted through official government social media profiles.
