= Our Future (political party) =

Our Future Naša prihodnost
- Leader: Ivan Gale
- Founded: February 2022
- Headquarters: Stegne 11a 1000 Ljubljana
- Political position: Centre
- Colours: Green, Blue
- National Assembly: 0 / 90
- European Parliament: 0 / 9

Website
- nasaprihodnost.si

Our Future (Slovene: Naša prihodnost) is a Slovenian political party founded in February 2022 during a digital congress. On Saturday, 12 March 2022, Ivan Gale was elected as party president, and former European Commissioner Violeta Bulc was elected vice-president.

In early September 2022, the party's council decided to support independent candidate Ivo Vajgl in the 2022 Slovenian presidential election.

== Programme ==
Key points of the party’s programme include: combatting corruption, media independence, self-sufficiency in all sectors, maintaining a social and legal state, professional staffing, and healthcare system reform.

== National Assembly elections ==
=== 2022 parliamentary election ===
In mid-March 2022, the party announced it would participate in the 2022 Slovenian parliamentary election on a joint list with the Good State party. The list included some well-known public figures such as rapper Zlatko, chef Alma Rekić, and former The Left MP Violeta Tomić. The joint list failed to enter parliament, receiving only 19,919 votes, or 1.7% of the total.
