= Lista Boris Popovič =

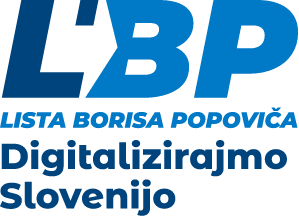
- Abbreviation: L'BP
- President: Boris Popovič
- Founded: 5 March 2022
- Headquarters: Gortanov trg 15; 6000 Koper
- Political position: political centre
- Colours: blue, blue
- National Assembly: 0 / 90
- European Parliament: 0 / 9

Website
- lbp.si

Lista Boris Popovič is a Slovenian political party founded by Slovenian politician and former mayor of Koper Boris Popovič. It was established ahead of the 2022 parliamentary elections. The main idea of the party's programme is digitalisation and the modernisation of the economy.

== Programme ==
The key points of the party's programme are: digitalisation, energy and ecologically responsible supply, tax and economic reforms, intelligent agriculture, free broadband internet for every household, and a fair and efficient rule of law.

== National Assembly elections ==
=== 2022 parliamentary elections ===
In its first election, the party did not pass the parliamentary threshold. It received 0.43% or 5,174 votes.
