= Our Country (Slovenia) =

Our Country Naša dežela
- Abbreviation: ND
- President: Aleksandra Pivec
- Vice President: Anita Manfreda
- Founder: Aleksandra Pivec
- Founded: 20 March 2021
- Split from: DeSUS
- Headquarters: Partizanska cesta 5, Maribor
- Ideology: Decentralization; Pro-Europeanism; Agrarianism
- Political position: Centre to centre-right
- Colours: Green; Yellow
- National Assembly: 0 / 90
- European Parliament: 0 / 9

Website
- nasadezela.si

Our Country or Our Land (Slovene: Naša dežela; ND) is a Slovene political party founded by Aleksandra Pivec.

== History ==
The founding congress of the party was held on 20 March 2021, in Maribor. Due to the epidemiological situation, the program was conducted by videoconference, and 173 of the 210 invited party delegates were present. Pivec was elected the party's first president.

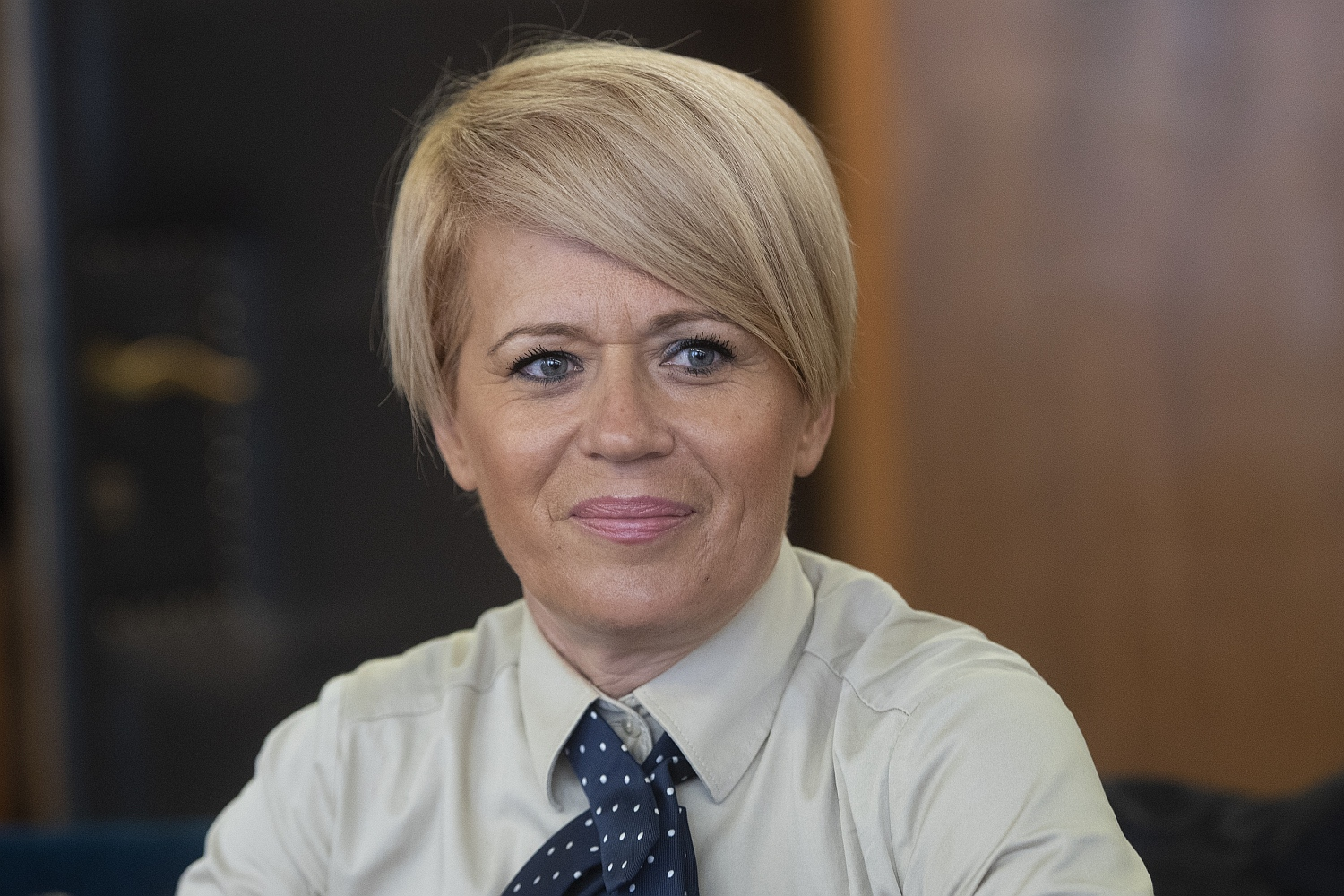
Aleksandra Pivec became the party's first president.

Pivec founded the party after a dispute in the Democratic Party of Pensioners of Slovenia (DeSUS), which she chaired for more than six months. The founding congress was attended by, among others, Anita Manfreda, Janez Ujčič, Danilo Burnač, Tina Novak Samec and Miha Recek. In the 2022 Slovenian parliamentary election, the party received 1.51% of the vote and fell below the 4% threshold required to enter the Parliament.

== Party leadership ==
- President: Aleksandra Pivec
- Vice President: Anita Manfreda
- President of the Party Council: Danilo Burnač
- Chair of the Supervisory Board: Lilijana Reljić

== Electoral results ==
=== National Assembly ===
Election	Leader	Votes	%	Seats	+/–	Government
2022	Aleksandra Pivec	17,846	1.50 (#13)	0 / 90	New	Extra-parliamentary
