= For the People of Slovenia =

For the People of Slovenia Za ljudstvo Slovenije
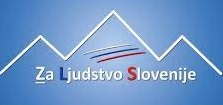
- President: Borut Loboda
- Founded: 30 January 2022
- Colours: White, Blue, Red
- National Assembly: 0 / 90
- European Parliament: 0 / 9

Website
- zaljudstvoslovenije.si

For the People of Slovenia (Slovene: Za ljudstvo Slovenije) is a Slovenian political party founded by politician and activist Anica Bidar. The founding congress was held on 30 January 2022. Bidar was elected the party's first president. The party announced it would have eight vice-presidents and stated that one of its main commitments would be to work with those willing to build new, solid foundations together. The current party president is Borut Loboda.

== Elections ==
=== 2022 National Assembly Election ===
In its first parliamentary election, the party did not pass the threshold for entry into the National Assembly. It received 0.70% of the vote, amounting to 8,218 ballots cast in its favour.

=== 2022 Local Elections ===
The party fielded candidates only in the municipality of Slovenska Bistrica, where it ran a mayoral candidate and a list for the municipal council. Mayoral candidate Romana Brzin received 2.72% of the vote (242 votes), finishing last among four candidates. The party nominated four candidates for the municipal council but did not win any seats.
