= Modern Centre Party =

Social-liberal political party in Slovenia

Modern Centre Party Stranka modernega centra
- President: Zdravko Počivalšek
- Founder: Miro Cerar
- Founded: 2 June 2014 (As Party of Miro Cerar)
- Dissolved: 4 December 2021
- Merged into: Concretely
- Headquarters: Ljubljana
- Ideology: Social liberalism Liberalism; Pro-Europeanism
- Political position: Centre to centre-left
- Regional affiliation: Liberal South East European Network (LIBSEEN)
- European affiliation: Alliance of Liberals and Democrats for Europe
- International affiliation: Liberal International

Website
- www.strankasmc.si/

The Modern Centre Party (Slovene: Stranka modernega centra, SMC) was a social-liberal political party in Slovenia led by Minister of Economical Development and Technology Zdravko Počivalšek, who succeeded former Prime Minister and former Minister of Foreign Affairs Miro Cerar as the party president. It formed in 2014 and merged with Economic Active Party in 2021, to form a party Concretely.

== History ==
The party was established during the founding congress on 2 June 2014 as the Party of Miro Cerar (Stranka Mira Cerarja, SMC). SMC was spearheaded by Miro Cerar, a law professor and legal advisor to parliament, and the son of a famous Yugoslav Slovene athlete. The party rapidly ascended to top opinion polls shortly after its establishment.

Only six weeks after its establishment, on 13 July 2014, the party received 34.6% of the vote in the 2014 parliamentary election, winning a plurality of 36 seats in the National Assembly, the most parliamentary seats of any party in the independent nation's history. Miro Cerar was appointed as the Prime Minister designate.

On 18 September 2014, the Cerar cabinet was formed, with the SMC as lead party in a coalition with the Democratic Party of Pensioners of Slovenia (DeSUS) and Social Democrats (SD).

Despite the outstanding performance during the parliamentary elections, SMC saw little success during the 2014 local elections, failing to win a single mayoral post.

On 21 November 2014, the SMC was admitted as a full member of the Alliance of Liberals and Democrats for Europe (ALDE) at the ALDE congress in Lisbon.

On 7 March 2015, at the SMC party congress, the name of the party was changed to Modern Centre Party.

After its record-setting electoral victory in 2014, SMC parliamentary representation was decimated in the 2018 Slovenian parliamentary election, the party having garnered just 9.8% of the vote, thus winning only 10 MP seats.

In the wake of the 2018 parliamentary election, Milan Brglez, hitherto Speaker of Parliament and SMC vice-president, was ejected from the party in a unanimous decision by the party's executive committee. Brglez alleged the expulsion was a result of his principled opposition to and criticism of some party decisions, and for his opposing a prospective SMC coalition with the right-wing Slovenian Democratic Party. Brglez further stated that the expulsion precipitated after allegations surfaced that he was considering a self-candidacy for a second speakership term (which Brglez denied) that enraged Cerar (who was purportedly also vying for the post), and that the expulsion was concocted by Cerar, who orchestrated it with a bottom-up reshuffling of willing party functionaries so as to enable the expulsion. Brglez had been known to quarrel with Cerar about government policy during Cerar's premiership, with Cerar calling on Brglez to resign on one occasion, though the two later partially reconciled. On 2019 party congress Zdravko Počivalšek was elected a new president of the party.

Following the negotiation to form a 14th Government under premiership of Janez Janša, which SMC would join, founder and former president Miro Cerar left the party saying that it no longer "pursued its founding values" and called on other party members to do the same.

On 26 March Janja Sluga, Igor Zorčič and Branislav Rajić left the party and announced that they are working on forming a new parliamentary group with Jurij Lepi that is to be led by Janja Sluga.

On 4 December 2021, SMC merged with a non-parliamentary Economic Active Party to form a new party, Concretely. With this, SMC's membership in ALDE was automatically terminated.

== Ideology ==
The party's initial focus was the "rule of law, liberalising the economy and improving the efficiency of the public sector". Cerar also voiced support for "liberalising the economy and labour market rules, cutting red tape and selling off smaller state firms", but offered few policy details before the party's premiere election.

== Electoral results ==
=== National Assembly ===
| Election | Leader | Votes | % | Seats | +/– | Government |
|---|---|---|---|---|---|---|
| 2014 | Miro Cerar | 298,342 | 34.6 (#1) | 36 / 90 | | Coalition |
| 2018 | Miro Cerar | 86,868 | 9.7 (#4) | 10 / 90 | ▼26 | Coalition |

=== European Parliament ===
| Election | Leader | Votes | % | Seats | +/– |
|---|---|---|---|---|---|
| 2019 | Gregor Perič | 7,823 | 1.6 (#12) | 0 / 8 | |

=== Presidential ===
| Election | Candidate | 1st round | | 2nd round | | Result |
| Election | Candidate | Votes | % | Votes | % | Result |
|---|---|---|---|---|---|---|
| 2017 | Maja Makovec Brenčič | 13,052 | 1.73 | | | Lost |
