= List of presidents of the National Council of Slovenia =

List of presidents of the National Council of Slovenia.

Below is a list of office-holders:

No.	Portrait	Name	Term of office		Party
1		Ivan Kristan	23 December 1992	17 December 1997	Liberal Democracy of Slovenia
2		Tone Hrovat	17 December 1997	17 December 2002	Slovenian People's Party
3		Janez Sušnik	17 December 2002	12 December 2007	Democratic Party of Pensioners of Slovenia
4		Blaž Kavčič	12 December 2007	30 September 2011	Liberal Democracy of Slovenia
4		Blaž Kavčič	30 September 2011	12 December 2012	Youth Party – European Greens
5		Mitja Bervar	12 December 2012	24 April 2017	Independent
5		Mitja Bervar	24 April 2017	12 December 2017	Modern Centre Party
6		Alojz Kovšca	12 December 2017	19 December 2022	GAS / Concretely
7		Marko Lotrič	19 December 2022	Incumbent	Independent / FOKUS

== See also ==
- National Council (Slovenia)
