= Parliament =

Legislative body of government

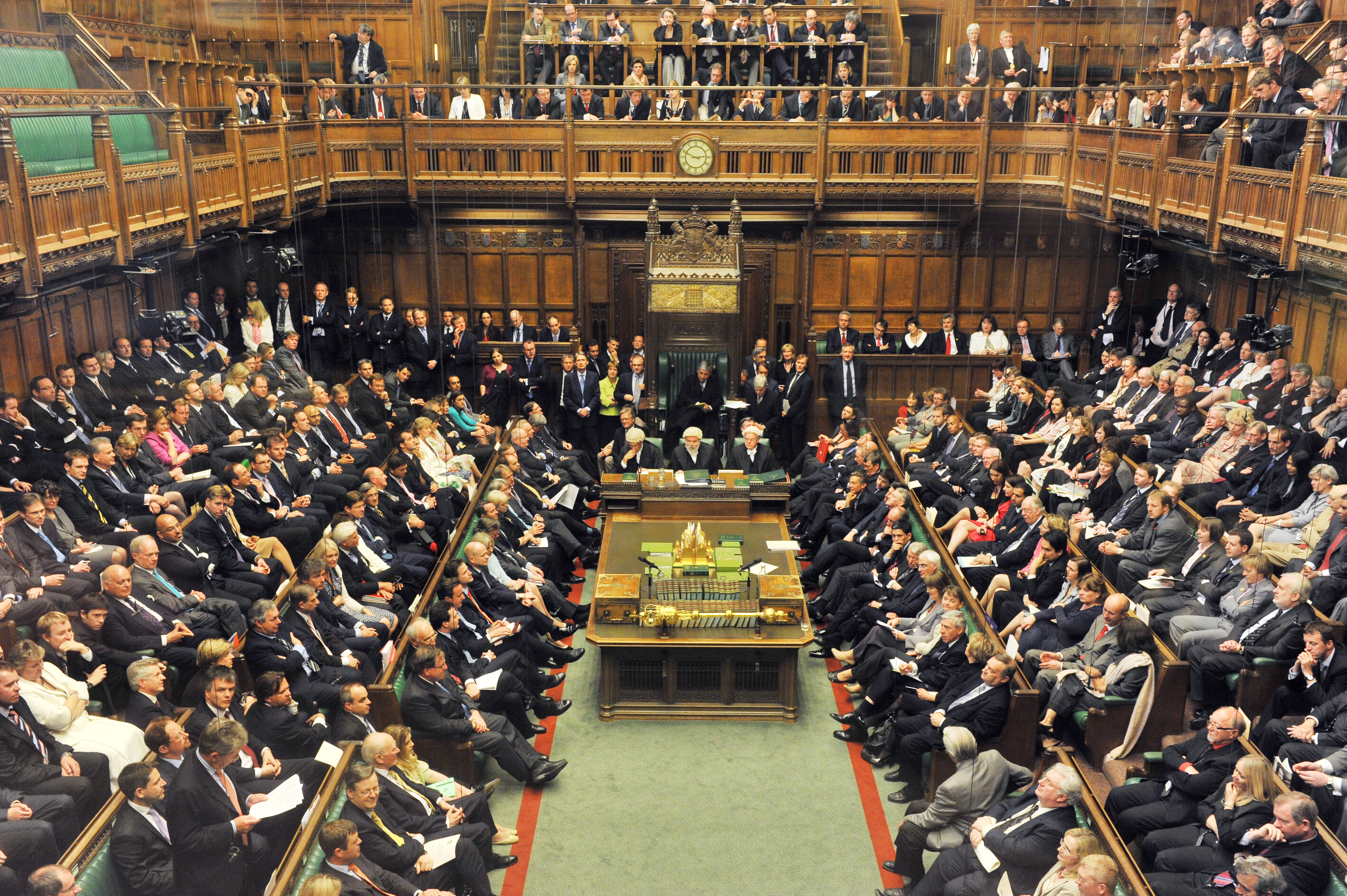
The facing benches of the House of Commons of the United Kingdom are said to contribute to an adversarial style of debate.

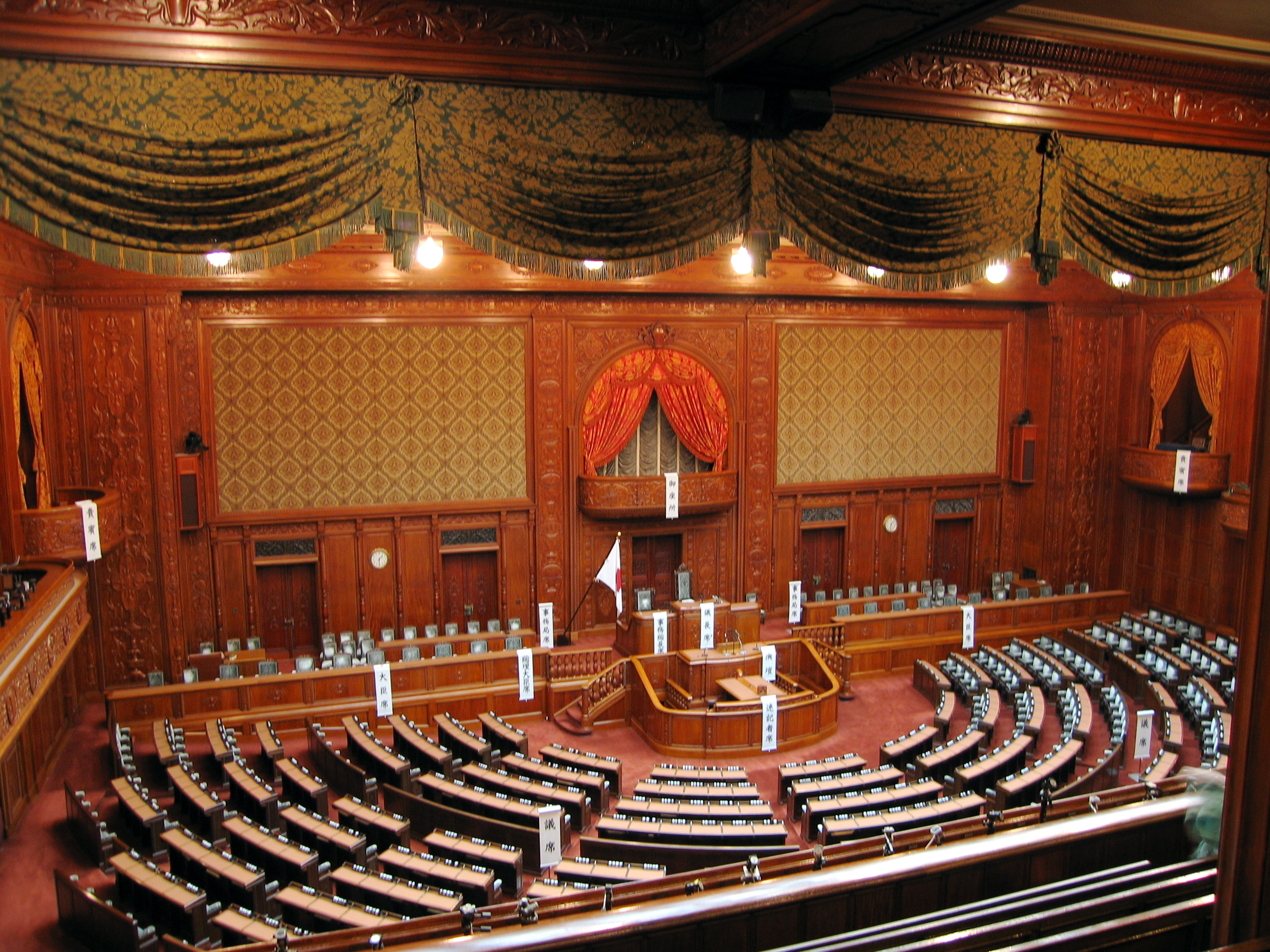
The hemicycle of the House of Representatives of Japan

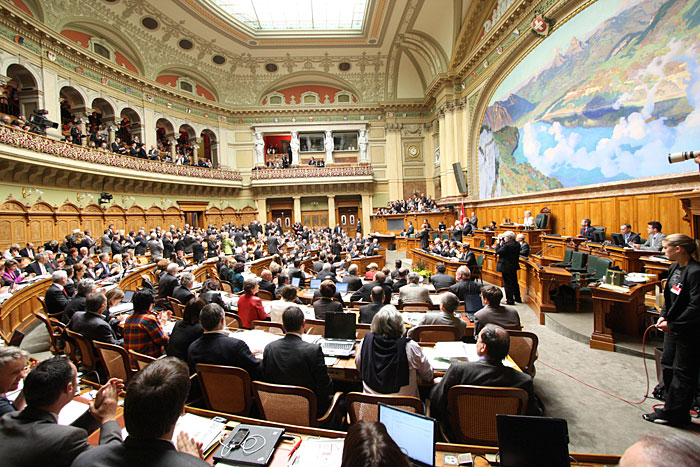
The National Council of Switzerland

A parliament is a type of legislature, or law-making body, of a state. Generally, a parliament has three functions: representing the electorate, making laws, and overseeing the executive government via hearings and inquiries. Its role is similar to that of a senate, synod or congress; a parliament is the institutional form of parliamentary systems based on the fusion of powers. The term parliament is commonly used in countries that are current or former monarchies. Some contexts restrict the use of the word to parliamentary systems, although it is also used to describe the legislature in some presidential systems (e.g., the Parliament of Ghana), even where it is not in the official name. A parliament is typically made up of elected members, who are legislators.

Historically, parliaments included various kinds of deliberative, consultative, and judicial assemblies. Parliamentary gatherings in the Middle Ages began to establish that monarchs were subject to law and first summoned representatives of common people, notably the Cortes of León in 1188, and an English parliament in 1265, which developed into an enduring House of Commons. In 1283 the Corts of Catalonia became Europe's first parliament to be officially recognized as a legislative body. During the early modern period, the Glorious Revolution of 1688 in Britain established the primacy of parliamentary sovereignty, through which the rule of law could be enforced. Many other modern concepts of parliamentary government developed in the Kingdom of Great Britain (1707–1800) and were later exported to other countries around the world. The revolutions of 1848 in Europe largely failed to strengthen parliaments in most European countries, as conservative forces regained control and reversed changes, but they made a return to the pre-1848 status quo impossible, leading to gradual, long-term parliamentary development across much of Europe. Expansion of suffrage in the 19th and 20th centuries led to many parliaments around the world becoming democratically elected.

== Etymology ==
The English term is derived from Anglo-Norman and dates to the 14th century, coming from the 11th century Old French word parlement 'discussion, discourse', from parler, 'to talk'. The meaning evolved over time, originally referring to any discussion, conversation, or negotiation through various kinds of deliberative or judicial groups, often summoned by a monarch. By the 15th century, in Britain, it had come to specifically mean the legislature.

== Early parliaments ==
Since ancient times, when societies were tribal, there were councils or a headman whose decisions were assessed by village elders. This is called tribalism. Some scholars suggest that in ancient Mesopotamia there was a primitive democratic government where the kings were assessed by council. The same has been said about ancient India, where some form of deliberative assemblies existed, and therefore there was some form of democracy. However, these claims are not accepted by other scholars, who see these forms of government as oligarchies.

Ancient Athens was the cradle of democracy. The Athenian assembly (ἐκκλησία, ekklesia) was the most important institution, and every free male citizen could take part in the discussions. Slaves and women could not. However, Athenian democracy was not representative, but rather direct, and therefore the ekklesia was different from the parliamentary system.

The Roman Republic had legislative assemblies, who had the final say regarding the election of magistrates, the enactment of new statutes, the carrying out of capital punishment, the declaration of war and peace, and the creation (or dissolution) of alliances. The Roman Senate controlled money, administration, and the details of foreign policy.

Assemblies and councils were prevalent in Europe following the collapse of the Roman Empire. However, these assemblies are distinct from parliaments in several ways:

- The assemblies were not national (unlike parliaments), but instead localized to smaller pre-state polities.
- The assemblies lacked institutional regularity, formal structure, and distinctive agendas.

The Parliament of England is unique by retaining the same parliamentary structure from its establishment in 1265 to the present, almost without interruption.

=== England ===
==== Early forms of assembly ====
England has long had a tradition of a body of men who would assist and advise the king on important matters. Under the Anglo-Saxon kings, there was an advisory council, the Witenagemot. The name derives from the Old English ƿitena ȝemōt, or witena gemōt, for "meeting of wise men". The first recorded act of a witenagemot was the law code issued by King Æthelberht of Kent around 600, the earliest document which survives in sustained Old English prose; however, the Witan was certainly in existence long before then. The Witan, along with the folkmoots (local assemblies), is an important ancestor of the modern English parliament.

As part of the Norman Conquest, the new king, William I, did away with the Witenagemot, replacing it with a Curia Regis ("King's Council"). Membership of the Curia was largely restricted to the tenants-in-chief, the few nobles who "rented" great estates directly from the king, along with ecclesiastics. William brought to England the feudal system of his native Normandy, and sought the advice of the Curia Regis before making laws. This is the original body from which the Parliament, the higher courts of law, and the Privy Council and Cabinet descend. Of these, the legislature is formally the High Court of Parliament; judges sit in the Supreme Court of Judicature. Only the executive government is no longer conducted in a royal court.

Most historians date the emergence of a parliament with some degree of power, to which the throne had to defer, no later than the reign of Edward I. Like previous kings, Edward called leading nobles and church leaders to discuss government matters, especially finance and taxation. A meeting in 1295 became known as the Model Parliament because it set the pattern for later Parliaments. The significant difference between the Model Parliament and the earlier Curia Regis was the addition of the Commons: that is, the inclusion of elected representatives of rural landowners and of townsmen. In 1307, Edward agreed not to collect certain taxes without the "consent of the realm" through parliament. He also enlarged the court system.

==== Magna Carta and the model parliament ====
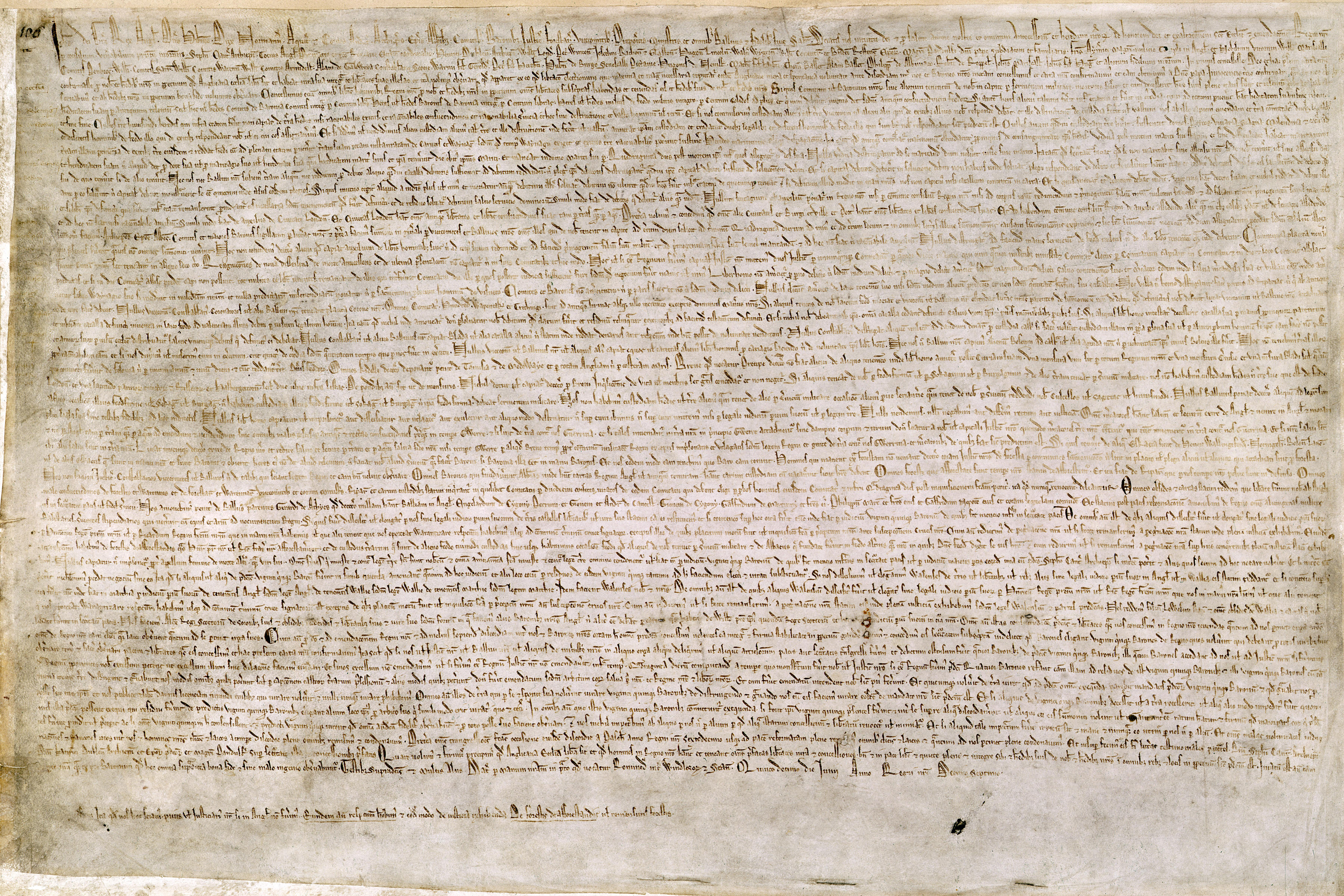
A 1215 edition of Magna Carta, as featured on display at the British Library

The tenants-in-chief often struggled for power with the ecclesiastics and the king. In 1215, they secured Magna Carta from King John of England. This established that the king may not levy or collect any taxes (except the feudal taxes to which they were hitherto accustomed), save with the consent of a council. It was also established that the most important tenants-in-chief and ecclesiastics be summoned to the council by personal writs from the sovereign, and that all others be summoned to the council by general writs from the sheriffs of their counties. Modern government has its origins in the Curia Regis; parliament descends from the Great Council, later known as the parliamentum, established by Magna Carta.

During the reign of King Henry III (13th century), English Parliaments included elected representatives from shires and towns. Thus these parliaments are considered forerunners of the modern parliament.

In 1265, Simon de Montfort, then in rebellion against Henry III, summoned a parliament of his supporters without royal authorisation. The archbishops, bishops, abbots, earls, and barons were summoned, as were two knights from each shire and two burgesses from each borough. Knights had been summoned to previous councils, but it was unprecedented for the boroughs to be represented. In 1295, Edward I adopted De Montfort's ideas for representation and election in the so-called "Model Parliament". At first, each estate debated independently; by the reign of Edward III, however, Parliament had grown closer to its modern form, with the legislative body having two separate chambers.

==== Parliament under Henry VIII and Edward VI ====
The purpose and structure of Parliament in Tudor England underwent a significant transformation under the reign of Henry VIII. Originally its methods were primarily medieval, and the monarch still possessed a form of inarguable dominion over its decisions. According to Elton, it was Thomas Cromwell, 1st Earl of Essex, then chief minister to Henry VIII, who initiated still other changes within parliament.

The Acts of Supremacy established the monarch as head of the Church of England.

==== Civil War and beyond ====
The power of Parliament, in its relationship with the monarch, increased considerably after the Civil War, and again at the Glorious Revolution. It also provided the country with unprecedented stability. More stability, in turn, helped assure more effective management, organisation, and efficiency. Parliament printed statutes and devised a more coherent parliamentary procedure.

The rise of Parliament proved especially important in the sense that it limited the repercussions of dynastic complications that had so often plunged England into civil war. Parliament still ran the country even in the absence of suitable heirs to the throne, and its legitimacy as a decision-making body reduced the royal prerogatives of kings like Henry VIII and the importance of their whims. For example, Henry VIII could not simply establish supremacy by proclamation; he required Parliament to enforce statutes and add felonies and treasons. An important liberty for Parliament was its freedom of speech; Henry allowed anything to be spoken openly within Parliament and speakers could not face arrest – a fact which they exploited incessantly. Nevertheless, Parliament in Henry VIII's time offered up very little objection to the monarch's desires. Under his and Edward's reign, the legislative body complied willingly with the majority of the kings' decisions.

Much of this compliance stemmed from how the English viewed and traditionally understood authority. As Williams described it, "King and parliament were not separate entities, but a single body, of which the monarch was the senior partner and the Lords and the Commons the lesser, but still essential, members."

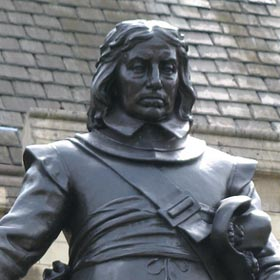
The statue of Oliver Cromwell, as it stands outside the House of Commons at the Palace of Westminster

Although its role in government had expanded significantly in the mid-16th century, the Parliament of England saw some of its most important gains in the 17th century. A series of conflicts between the Crown and Parliament culminated in the execution of King Charles I in 1649. For a brief period, England became a commonwealth, with Oliver Cromwell the de facto ruler, with the title of Lord Protector. Frustrated with its decisions, Cromwell purged and suspended Parliament on several occasions.

A controversial figure notorious for his actions in Ireland, Cromwell is nonetheless regarded as essential to the growth of democracy in England. The years of the Commonwealth, coupled with the restoration of the monarchy in 1660 and the subsequent Glorious Revolution of 1688, helped reinforce and strengthen Parliament as an institution separate from the Crown.

==== Acts of Union ====
The Parliament of England met until it merged with the Parliament of Scotland under the Acts of Union. This union created the new Parliament of Great Britain in 1707. The Parliament of the United Kingdom followed at the union with Ireland.

=== France ===
Originally, there was only the Parlement of Paris, born out of the Curia Regis in 1307, and located inside the medieval royal palace, now the Paris Hall of Justice. The jurisdiction of the Parliament of Paris covered the entire kingdom. In the thirteenth century, judicial functions were added. In 1443, following the turmoil of the Hundred Years' War, King Charles VII of France granted Languedoc its own parliament by establishing the Parliament of Toulouse, the first parliament outside of Paris, whose jurisdiction extended over the most part of southern France. From 1443 until the French Revolution several other parliaments were created in some provinces of France (Grenoble, Bordeaux).

All the parliaments could issue regulatory decrees for the application of royal edicts or of customary practices; they could also refuse to register laws that they judged contrary to fundamental law or simply as being untimely. Parliamentary power in France was suppressed more so than in England as a result of absolutism, and parliaments were eventually overshadowed by the larger Estates General, up until the French Revolution, when the last Estates General transformed itself into a National Assembly, a legislative body whose existence is independent of the royal power.

=== Germanic and Nordic countries ===
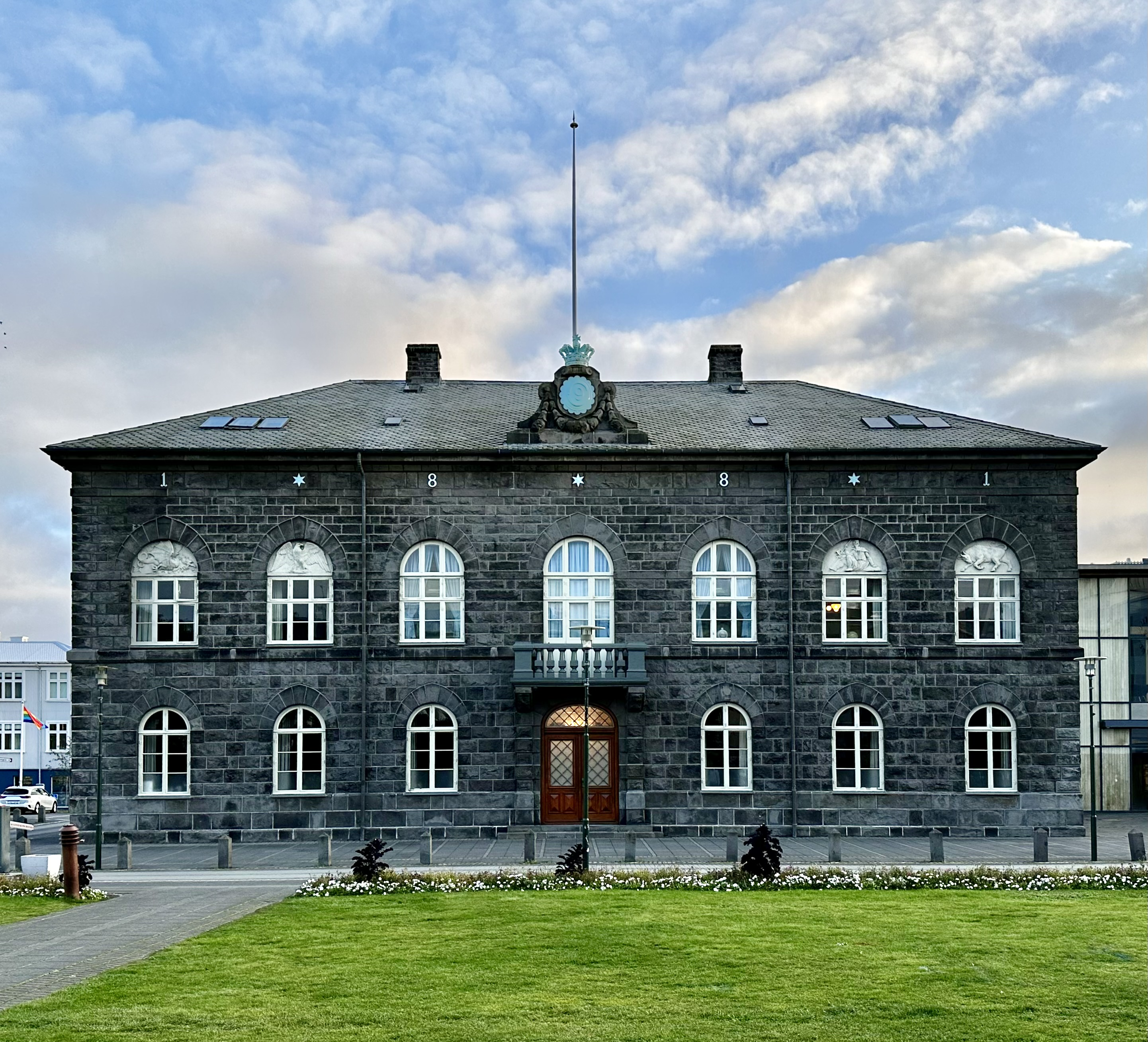
Iceland's parliament house, the Alþingishúsið, at Austurvöllur in Reykjavík, built in 1880–1881, home of one of the oldest still-acting parliaments in the world

A thing or ting (Old Norse and Icelandic: þing; other modern Scandinavian: ting, ding in Dutch) was the governing assembly in Germanic societies, made up of the free men of the community and presided by lawspeakers.

The thing was the assembly of the free men of a country, province or a hundred (hundare/härad/herred). There were consequently, hierarchies of things, so that the local things were represented at the thing for a larger area, for a province or land. At the thing, disputes were solved and political decisions were made. The place for the thing was often also the place for public religious rites and for commerce.

The thing met at regular intervals, legislated, elected chieftains and kings, and judged according to the law, which was memorised and recited by the "law speaker" (the judge).

The Icelandic, Faroese and Manx parliaments trace their origins back to the Viking expansion originating from the petty kingdoms of Norway as well as Denmark, replicating Viking government systems in the conquered territories, such as those represented by the Gulating near Bergen in western Norway:

- The Icelandic Althing, dating from 930.
- The Faroese Løgting, dating from a similar period.
- The Manx Tynwald, which claims to be over 1,000 years old.

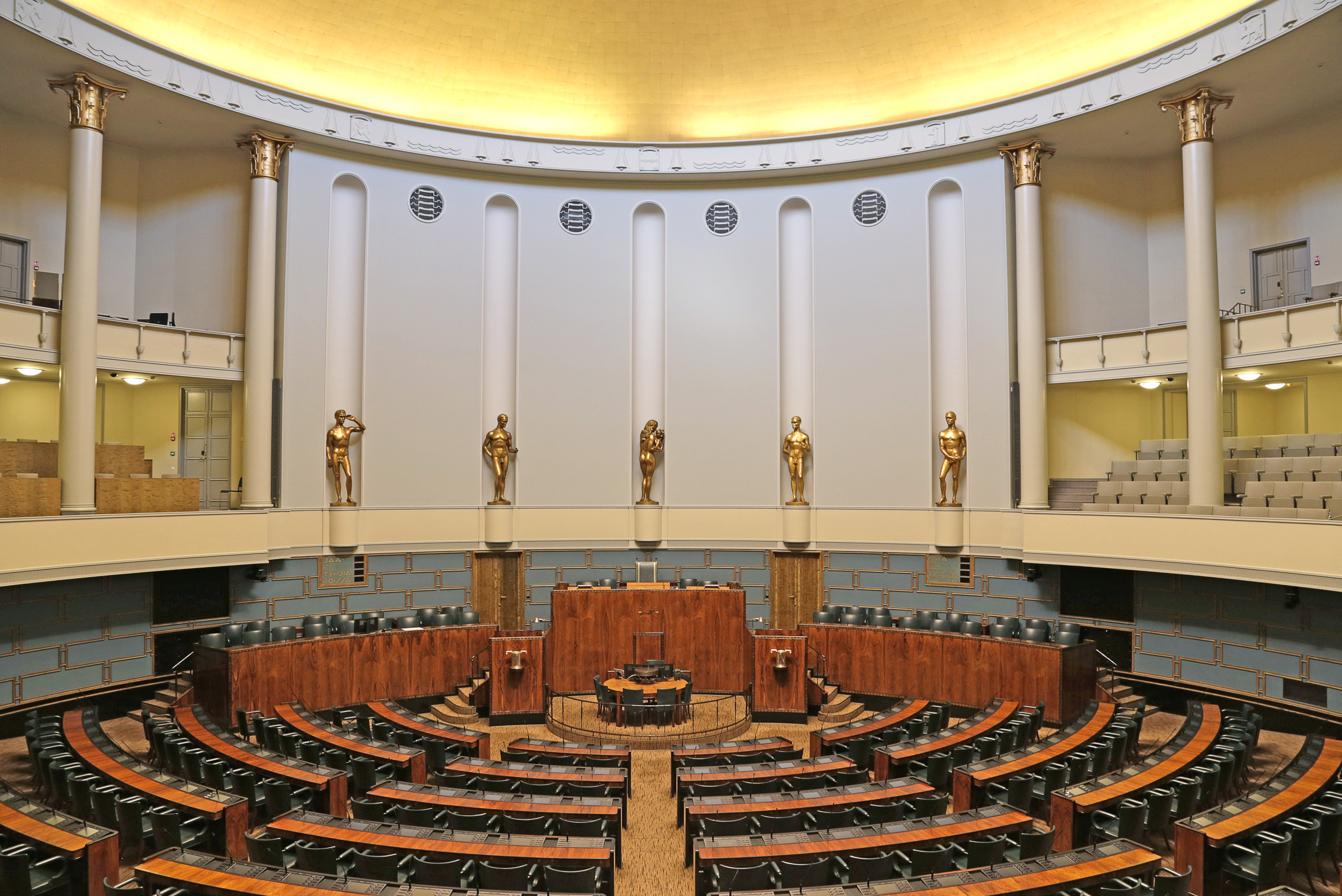
The Art Deco-styled session hall of the Parliament House of Finland

Later national diets with chambers for different estates developed, e.g. in Sweden and in Finland (which was part of Sweden until 1809), each with a House of Knights for the nobility. In both these countries, the national parliaments are now called riksdag (in Finland also eduskunta), a word used since the Middle Ages and equivalent of the German word Reichstag.

Today the term lives on in the official names of national legislatures and other institutions in the North Germanic countries. In Yorkshire and former Danelaw areas of England, which were subject to Norse invasion and settlement, the wapentake was another name for the same institution.

In the Low Countries, the equivalent assembly developed into the States-General (Staten-Generaal), which first met in Bruges in 1464 as a gathering of representatives from the provinces of the Burgundian Netherlands. Initially a feudal consultative body convened by the Duke of Burgundy, it evolved during the Dutch Revolt (1568–1648) into a sovereign assembly of the Dutch Republic, and later became the bicameral parliament of the Netherlands.

=== Italy ===
The Sicilian Parliament in Palermo, dating to 1097, evolved as the legislature of the Kingdom of Sicily.

=== Hungary ===
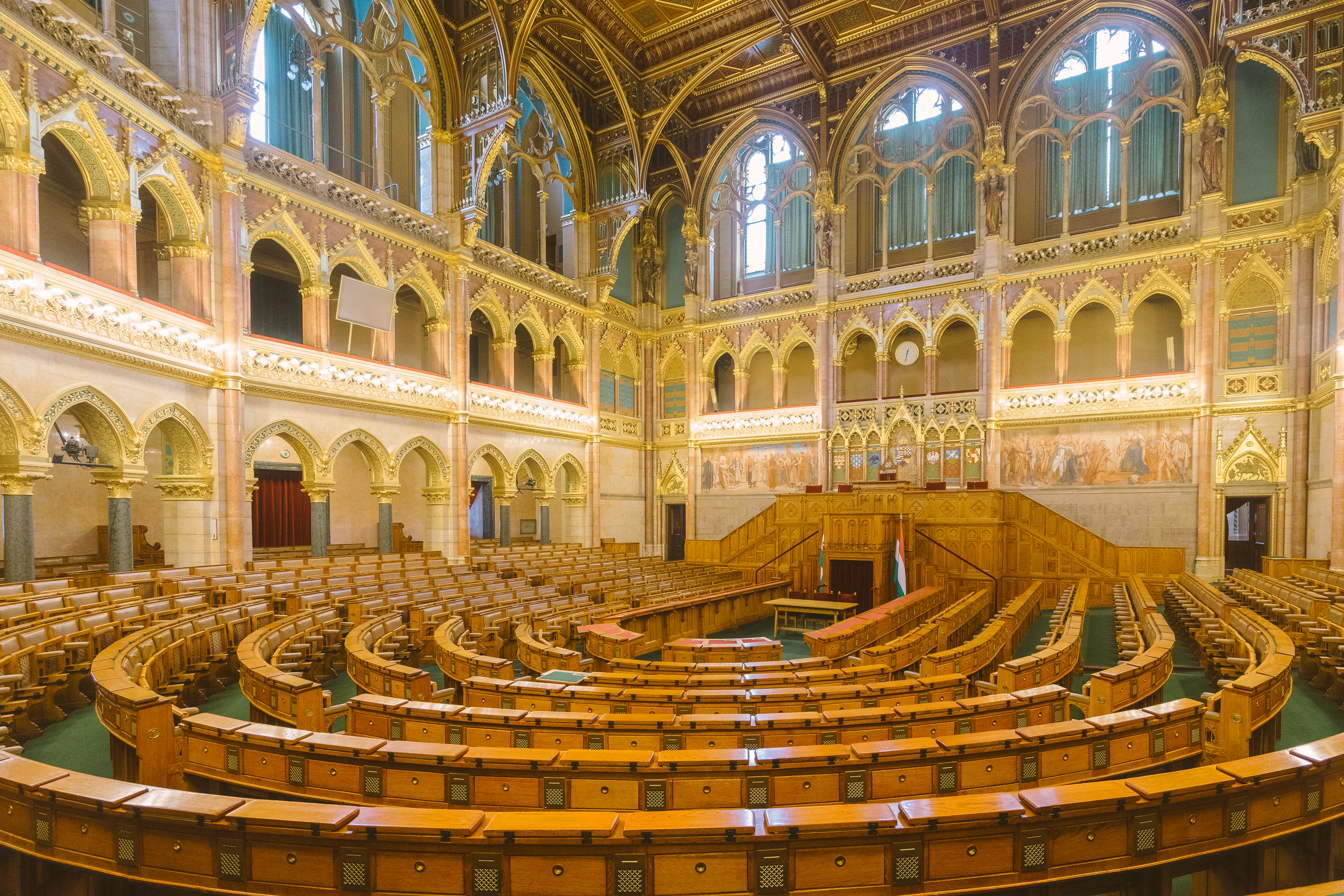
Interior of the Hungarian Parliament Building (in Hungarian: Országház)

The Diet of Hungary, or originally Parlamentum Publicum and Parlamentum Generale (Hungarian: Országgyűlés), became the supreme legislative institution in the medieval kingdom of Hungary from the 1290s, and in its successor states, Royal Hungary and the Habsburg kingdom of Hungary throughout the early modern period. The name of the legislative body was originally "Parlamentum" during the Middle Ages, the "Diet" expression gained mostly in the early modern period. It convened at regular intervals with interruptions during the period of 1527 to 1918, and again until 1946.

Some researchers have traced the roots of the Hungarian institution of national assemblies as far back as the 11th century. This based on documentary evidence that, on certain "important occasions" under the reigns of King Ladislaus I and King Coloman "the Learned", assemblies were held on a national scale where both ecclesiastic and secular dignitaries made appearances. The first exact written mention of the word "parlamentum" (Parliament) for the nationwide assembly originated during the reign of King Andrew II in the Golden Bull of 1222, which reaffirmed the rights of the smaller nobles of the old and new classes of royal servants (servientes regis) against both the crown and the magnates, and to defend the rights of the whole nation against the crown by restricting the powers of the latter in certain fields and legalizing refusal to obey its unlawful/unconstitutional commands (the "ius resistendi"). The lesser nobles also began to present Andrew with grievances, a practice that evolved into the institution of the Hungarian Diet.

An institutionalized Hungarian parliament emerged during the 14th and 15th centuries. Beginning under King Charles I, continuing under subsequent kings through into the reign of King Matthias I, the Diet was essentially convened by the king. However, under the rule of heavy handed kings like Louis the Great and during reign of the early absolutist Matthias Corvinus the parliaments were often convened to announce the royal decisions, and had no significant power of its own. Since the reign of the Jagiellonian dynasty, the parliament has regained most of its former power.

=== Poland ===
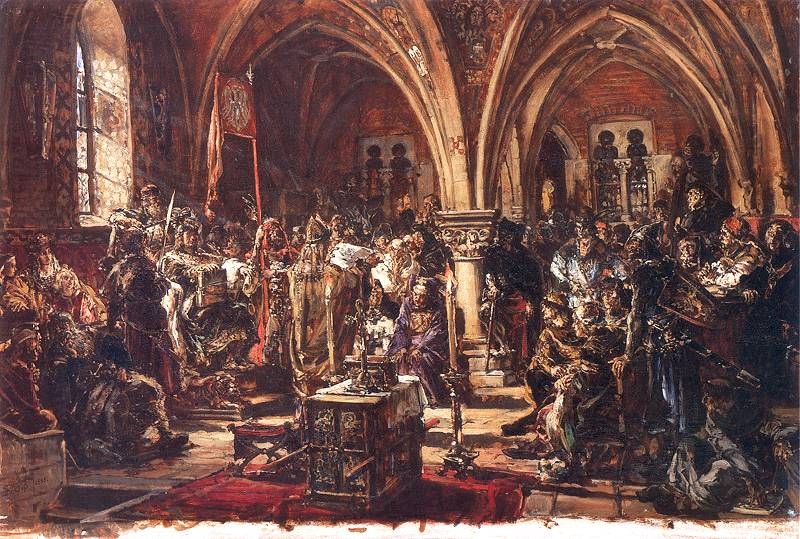
The First Sejm in Łęczyca. Recording of laws. A.D. 1180

According to the Chronicles of Gallus Anonymus, the first legendary Polish ruler, Siemowit, who began the Piast dynasty, was chosen by an ancient wiec council. The idea of the wiec led to the development of the Polish parliament, the Sejm, in around 1180.

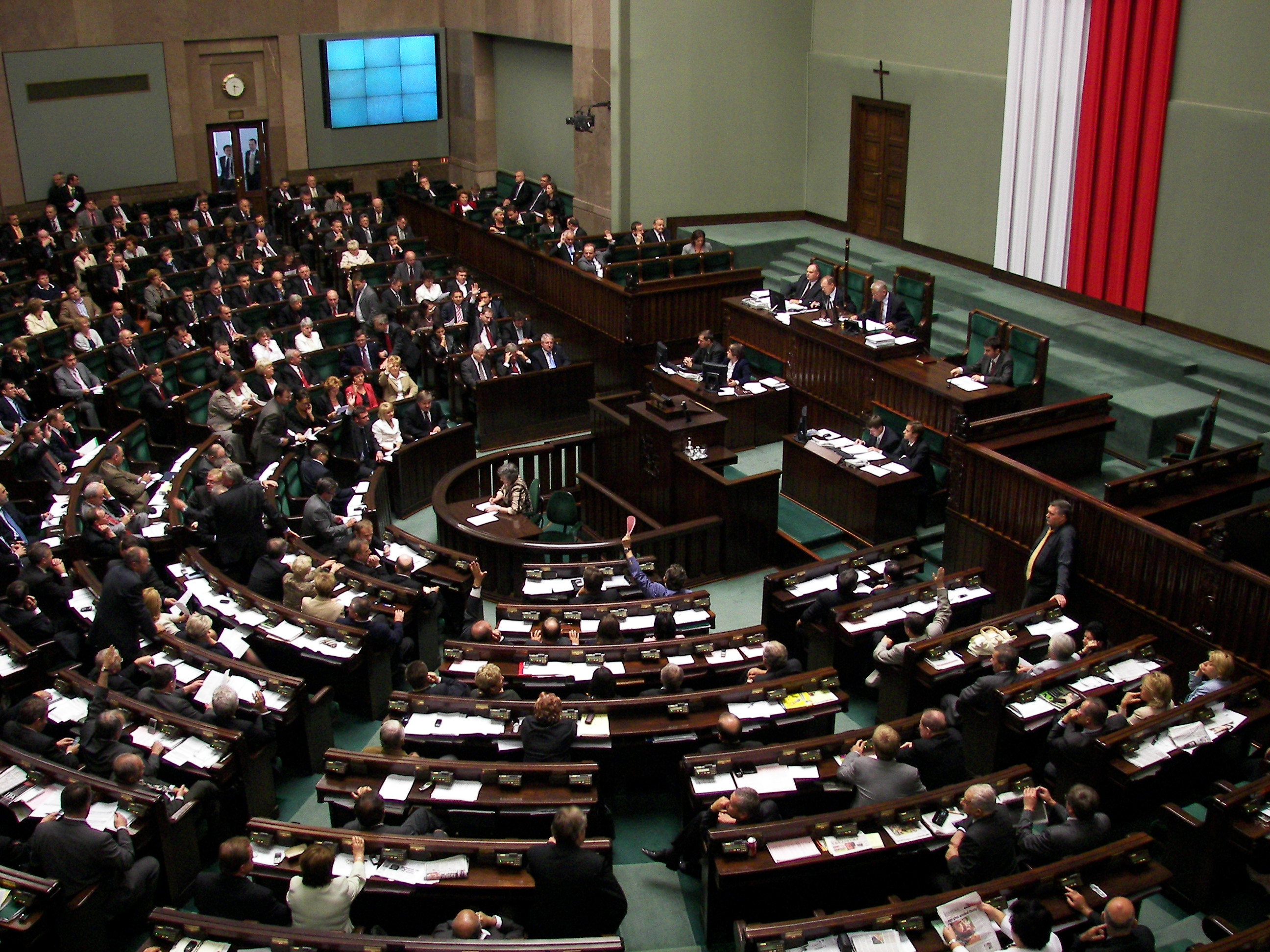
The modern Sejm

The term "sejm" comes from an old Polish expression denoting a meeting of the populace. The power of early sejms grew between 1146 and 1295, when the power of individual rulers waned and various councils grew stronger. Since the 14th century irregular sejms (described in various Latin sources as contentio generalis, conventio magna, conventio solemna, parlamentum, parlamentum generale, dieta) have been convened by Poland's monarchs. From 1374, the king had to receive permission from that assembly to raise taxes and the 1454 Nieszawa Statutes granted the szlachta (nobles) unprecedented concessions and authority. The General Sejm (Polish sejm generalny or sejm walny), first convoked by the John I Albert in 1493 near Piotrków, evolved from earlier regional and provincial meetings called sejmiks. Simultaneously, the Senate was founded on the earlier curia regis, convened at the king's discretion. Hence, the year 1493 marked the beginning of a bicameral legislative body of government. With the subsequent development of Polish Golden Liberty in the next several decades, the Sejm's powers systematically increased. Poland was among the few countries in Europe where the parliament played an especially important role in its national identity as it contributed to the unity of the nation and the state.

The general parliament of the Polish–Lithuanian Commonwealth consisted of three estates – the King of Poland, the Senate (consisting of Ministers, Palatines, Castellans and Roman Catholic Bishops) and the Chamber of Envoys comprising 170 nobles acting on behalf of their holdings as well as representatives of major cities, who did not possess any voting privileges. In 1573, a convocation sejm established an elective monarchy in the Commonwealth.

=== Portugal ===
After its self-proclamation as an independent kingdom in 1139 by Afonso I of Portugal (followed by the recognition by the Kingdom of León in the Treaty of Zamora of 1143), the first historically established Cortes of the Kingdom of Portugal occurred in 1211 in Coimbra by initiative of Afonso II of Portugal. These established the first general laws of the kingdom (Leis Gerais do Reino): protection of the king's property, stipulation of measures for the administration of justice and the rights of his subjects to be protected from abuses by royal officials, and confirming the clerical donations of the previous king Sancho I of Portugal.

After the conquest of Algarve in 1249, the Kingdom of Portugal completed its Reconquista. In 1254 King Afonso III of Portugal summoned Portuguese Cortes in Leiria, with the inclusion of burghers from old and newly incorporated municipalities. This inclusion establishes the Cortes of Leiria of 1254 as the second sample of modern parliamentarism in the history of Europe (after the Cortes of León in 1188). In these Cortes the monetagio was introduced: a fixed sum was to be paid by the burghers to the Crown as a substitute for the septennium (the traditional revision of the face value of coinage by the Crown every seven years). These Cortes also introduced staple laws on the Douro River, favouring the new royal city of Vila Nova de Gaia at the expense of the old episcopal city of Porto.

The Portuguese Cortes met again under King Afonso III of Portugal in 1256, 1261 and 1273, always by royal summon. Medieval Kings of Portugal continued to rely on small assemblies of notables, and only summoned the full Cortes on extraordinary occasions. A Cortes would be called if the king wanted to introduce new taxes, change some fundamental laws, announce significant shifts in foreign policy (e.g. ratify treaties), or settle matters of royal succession, issues where the cooperation and assent of the towns was thought necessary. Changing taxation (especially requesting war subsidies), was probably the most frequent reason for convening the Cortes. As the nobles and clergy were largely tax-exempt, setting taxation involved intensive negotiations between the royal council and the burgher delegates at the Cortes.

Delegates (procuradores) not only considered the king's proposals, but, in turn, also used the Cortes to submit petitions of their own to the royal council on a myriad of matters, e.g. extending and confirming town privileges, punishing abuses of officials, introducing new price controls, constraints on Jews, pledges on coinage, etc. The royal response to these petitions became enshrined as ordinances and statutes, thus giving the Cortes the aspect of a legislature. These petitions were originally referred to as aggravamentos (grievances) then artigos (articles) and eventually capitulos (chapters). In a Cortes-Gerais, petitions were discussed and voted upon separately by each estate and required the approval of at least two of the three estates before being passed up to the royal council. The proposal was then subject to royal veto (either accepted or rejected by the king in its entirety) before becoming law.

Nonetheless, the exact extent of Cortes power was ambiguous. Kings insisted on their ancient prerogative to promulgate laws independently of the Cortes. The compromise, in theory, was that ordinances enacted in Cortes could only be modified or repealed by Cortes. But even that principle was often circumvented or ignored in practice.

The Cortes probably had their heyday in the 14th and 15th centuries, reaching their apex when John I of Portugal relied almost wholly upon the bourgeoisie for his power. For a period after the 1383–1385 Crisis, the Cortes were convened almost annually. But as time went on, they became less important. Portuguese monarchs, tapping into the riches of the Portuguese empire overseas, grew less dependent on Cortes subsidies and convened them less frequently. John II (r.1481-1495) used them to break the high nobility, but dispensed with them otherwise. Manuel I (r.1495-1521) convened them only four times in his long reign. By the time of Sebastian (r.1554–1578), the Cortes was practically an irrelevance.

Curiously, the Cortes gained a new importance with the Iberian Union of 1581, finding a role as the representative of Portuguese interests to the new Habsburg monarch. The Cortes played a critical role in the 1640 Restoration, and enjoyed a brief period of resurgence during the reign of John IV of Portugal (r.1640-1656). But by the end of the 17th century, it found itself sidelined once again. The last Cortes met in 1698, for the mere formality of confirming the appointment of Infante John (future John V of Portugal) as the successor of Peter II of Portugal. Thereafter, Portuguese kings ruled as absolute monarchs and no Cortes were assembled for over a century. This state of affairs came to an end with the Liberal Revolution of 1820, which set in motion the introduction of a new constitution, and a permanent and proper parliament, that however inherited the name of Cortes Gerais.

=== Russia ===
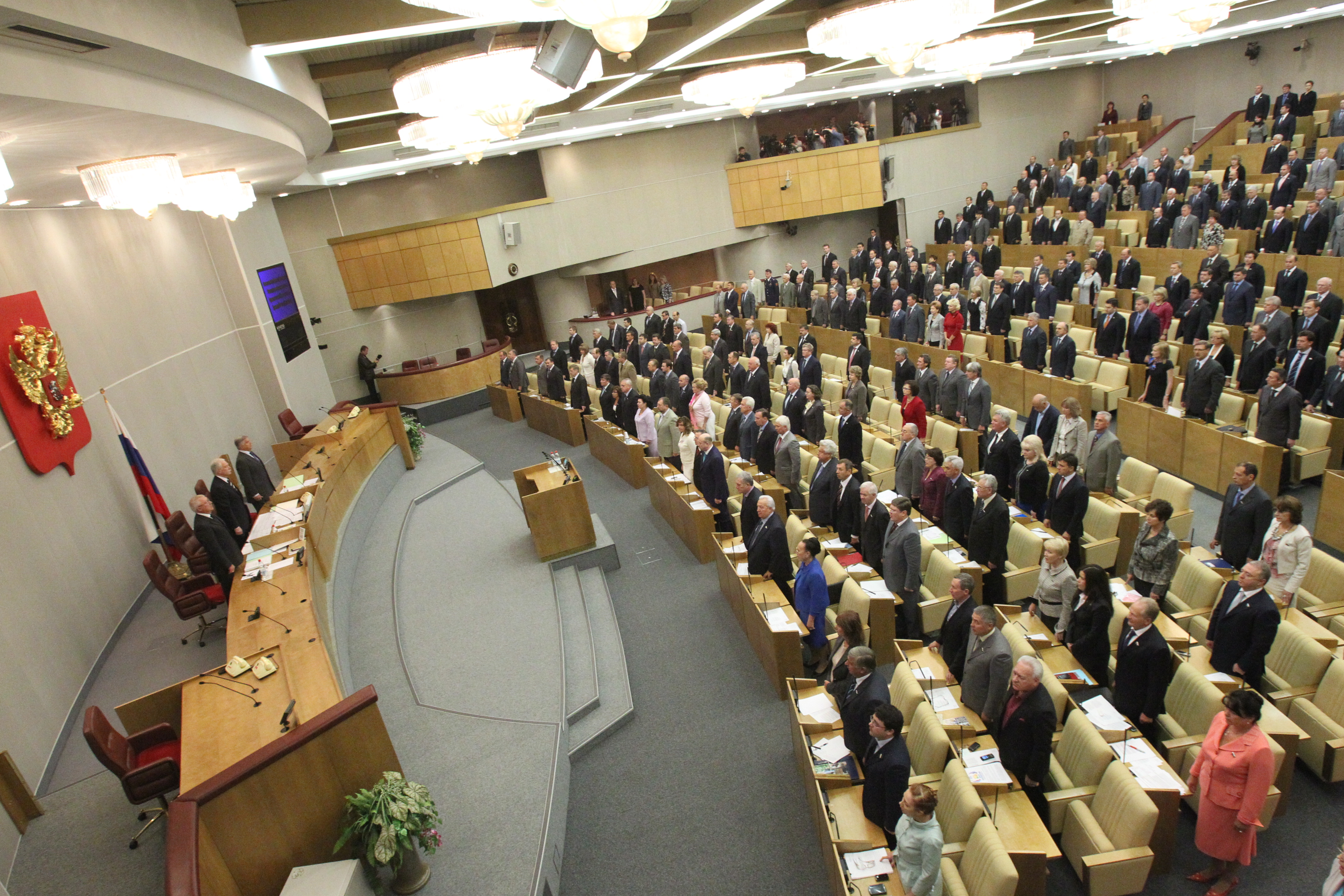
State Duma of the Federal Assembly of Russia

The zemsky sobor (Russian: зе́мский собо́р) was the first Russian parliament of the feudal Estates type, in the 16th and 17th centuries. The term roughly means assembly of the land.

It could be summoned either by tsar, or patriarch, or the Boyar Duma. Three categories of population, comparable to the Estates-General of France but with the numbering of the first two Estates reversed, participated in the assembly:

- Nobility and high bureaucracy, including the Boyar Duma
- The Holy Sobor of high Orthodox clergy
- Representatives of merchants and townspeople (third estate)

The name of the parliament of nowadays Russian Federation is the Federal Assembly of Russia. The term for its lower house, State Duma (which is better known than the Federal Assembly itself, and is often mistaken for the entirety of the parliament) comes from the Russian word думать (dumat), "to think". The Boyar Duma was an advisory council to the grand princes and tsars of Muscovy. The Duma was discontinued by Peter the Great, who transferred its functions to the Governing Senate in 1711.

==== Novgorod and Pskov ====
The veche was the highest legislature and judicial authority in the republic of Novgorod until 1478. In its sister state, Pskov, a separate veche operated until 1510.

Since the Novgorod revolution of 1137 ousted the ruling grand prince, the veche became the supreme state authority. After the reforms of 1410, the veche was restructured on a model similar to that of Venice, becoming the Commons chamber of the parliament. An upper Senate-like Council of Lords was also created, with title membership for all former city magistrates. Some sources indicate that veche membership may have become full-time, and parliament deputies were now called vechniks. It is recounted that the Novgorod assembly could be summoned by anyone who rung the veche bell, although it is more likely that the common procedure was more complex. This bell was a symbol of republican sovereignty and independence. The whole population of the city—boyars, merchants, and common citizens—then gathered at Yaroslav's Court. Separate assemblies could be held in the districts of Novgorod. In Pskov the veche assembled in the court of the Trinity cathedral.

=== Roman Catholic Church ===
"Conciliarism" or the "conciliar movement", was a reform movement in the 14th and 15th century Roman Catholic Church which held that final authority in spiritual matters resided with the Roman Church as corporation of Christians, embodied by a general church council, not with the pope. In effect, the movement sought – ultimately, in vain – to create an All-Catholic Parliament. Its struggle with the Papacy had many points in common with the struggle of parliaments in specific countries against the authority of Kings and other secular rulers.

=== Scotland ===
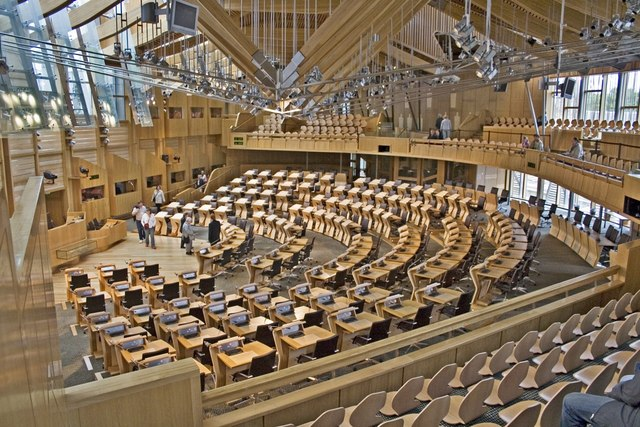
The debating chamber of the reconvened Scottish Parliament from the public gallery

From the 10th century the Kingdom of Alba was ruled by chiefs (toisechs) and subkings (mormaers) under the suzerainty, real or nominal, of a High King. Popular assemblies, as in Ireland, were involved in law-making, and sometimes in king-making, although the introduction of tanistry—naming a successor in the lifetime of a king—made the second less than common. These early assemblies cannot be considered "parliaments" in the later sense of the word, and were entirely separate from the later, Norman-influenced, institution.

The Parliament of Scotland evolved during the Middle Ages from the King's Council of Bishops and Earls. The unicameral parliament is first found on record, referred to as a colloquium, in 1235 at Kirkliston (a village now in Edinburgh).

By the early fourteenth century the attendance of knights and freeholders had become important, and from 1326 burgh commissioners attended. Consisting of the Three Estates; of clerics, lay tenants-in-chief and burgh commissioners sitting in a single chamber, the Scottish parliament acquired significant powers over particular issues. Most obviously it was needed for consent for taxation (although taxation was only raised irregularly in Scotland in the medieval period), but it also had a strong influence over justice, foreign policy, war, and all manner of other legislation, whether political, ecclesiastical, social or economic. Parliamentary business was also carried out by "sister" institutions, before c. 1500 by General Council and thereafter by the Convention of Estates. These could carry out much business also dealt with by Parliament – taxation, legislation and policy-making – but lacked the ultimate authority of a full parliament.

The parliament, which is also referred to as the Estates of Scotland, the Three Estates, the Scots Parliament or the auld Scots Parliament (Eng: old), met until the Acts of Union merged the Parliament of Scotland and the Parliament of England, creating the new Parliament of Great Britain in 1707.

Following the 1997 Scottish devolution referendum, and the passing of the Scotland Act 1998 by the Parliament of the United Kingdom, the Scottish Parliament was reconvened on 1 July 1999, although with much more limited powers than its 18th-century predecessor. The parliament has sat since 2004 at its newly constructed Scottish Parliament Building in Edinburgh, situated at the foot of the Royal Mile, next to the royal palace of Holyroodhouse.

=== Spain ===
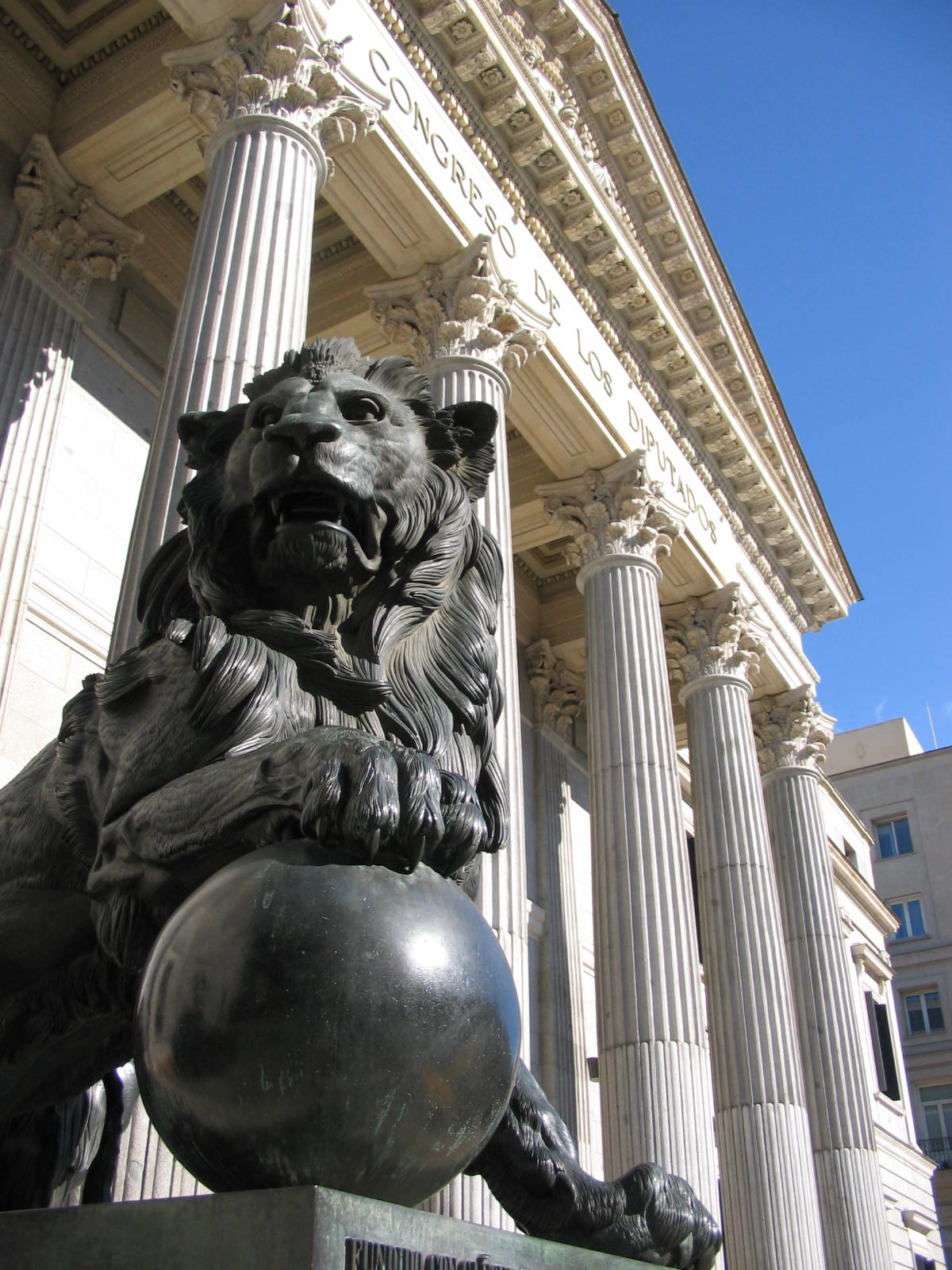
The Congress of Deputies, the lower house of the Spanish Parliament

Although there are documented councils held in 873, 1020, 1050 and 1063, there was no representation of commoners. What is considered to be the first parliament, the Cortes of León, was held in the Kingdom of León in 1188. According to the UNESCO, the Decreta of Leon of 1188 is the oldest documentary manifestation of the European parliamentary system. In addition, UNESCO granted the 1188 Cortes of Alfonso IX the title of "Memory of the World" and the city of Leon has been recognized as the "Cradle of Parliamentarism".

After coming to power, King Alfonso IX, facing an attack by his two neighbours, Castile and Portugal, decided to summon his royal council (Latin: curia regis). This was a medieval organization composed of aristocrats and bishops but because of the seriousness of the situation and the need to maximize political support, Alfonso IX took the decision to also call the representatives of the urban middle class from the most important cities of the kingdom to the assembly. León's Cortes dealt with matters like the right to private property, the inviolability of domicile, the right to appeal to justice opposite the King and the obligation of the King to consult the Cortes before entering a war. Prelates, nobles, and commoners met separately in the three estates of the Cortes. In this meeting, new laws were approved to protect commoners against the arbitrarities of nobles, prelates, and the king. This important set of laws is known as the Carta Magna Leonesa.

Following this event, new Cortes would appear in the other different territories that would make up Spain: Principality of Catalonia in 1192, the Kingdom of Castile in 1250, Kingdom of Aragon in 1274, Kingdom of Valencia in 1283 and Kingdom of Navarre in 1300. In 1283, presided over by king Peter II (III of Aragon), the General Court of Catalonia became the first parliamentary body in Europe with officially recognized co-legislative power (alongside the monarch), beyond the custom.

After the union of the Kingdoms of Leon and Castile under the Crown of Castile, their Cortes were united as well in 1258. The Castilian Cortes had representatives from Burgos, Toledo, León, Seville, Córdoba, Murcia, Jaén, Zamora, Segovia, Ávila, Salamanca, Cuenca, Toro, Valladolid, Soria, Madrid, Guadalajara and Granada (after 1492). The Cortes' assent was required to pass new taxes, and could also advise the king on other matters. The comunero rebels intended a stronger role for the Cortes, but were defeated by the forces of Habsburg Emperor Charles V in 1521. The Cortes maintained some power, however, though it became more of a consultative entity. However, by the time of King Philip II, Charles's son, the Castilian Cortes had come under functionally complete royal control, with its delegates dependent on the Crown for their income.

The Cortes of the Crown of Aragon kingdoms retained their power to control the king's spending with regard to the finances of those kingdoms. But after the War of the Spanish Succession and the victory of another royal house – the Bourbons – and King Philip V, their Cortes were suppressed (those of Aragon and Valencia in 1707, and those of Catalonia and the Balearic islands in 1714).

The first Cortes representing the whole of Spain (and the Spanish empire of the day) assembled in 1812, in Cádiz, where it operated as a government in exile as at that time most of the rest of Spain was in the hands of Napoleon's army.

=== Switzerland ===
The Federal Diet of Switzerland was one of the longest-lived representative bodies in history, continuing from the 13th century to 1848.

=== Ukraine ===
Stemming from the tribal assemblies of the ancient Slavs, the viche (from Proto-Slavonic *větje, meaning 'council', 'counsel' or 'talk') functioned not only as a form of self-organization in cities of medieval Kievan Rusʹ but also as a form of protect against policies of the Princes. The tradition of viche contributed to the culture of peaceful assemblies in contemporary Ukraine.

The Sich Rada (council) was an institution of Cossack administration from the 16th to the 18th century. With the establishment of the Cossack Hetmanate in 1648, it was officially known as the General Military Council, or Cossack Rada, until 1750.

The Central Council of Ukraine, or the Central Rada, founded on March 4, 1917, was the All-Ukrainian council of the Ukrainian People's Republic, which declared its full state independence in the Fourth Universal of the Ukrainian Central Council in 1918. The contemporary Ukrainian parliament is called the Verkhovna Rada of Ukraine.

== Development of modern parliaments ==
The development of the modern concept of parliamentary government dates back to the Kingdom of Great Britain (1707–1800).

=== United Kingdom ===
The Parliament of Great Britain was formed in 1707 by the Acts of Union that replaced the former parliaments of England and Scotland. A further union in 1801 united the Parliament of Great Britain and the Parliament of Ireland into a Parliament of the United Kingdom. Through a series of Reform Acts in the 19th and 20th centuries, it became democratically elected.

The British Parliament is often referred to as the Mother of Parliaments (in fact a misquotation of John Bright, who remarked in 1865 that "England is the Mother of Parliaments") because the British Parliament has been the model for most other parliamentary systems, and its Acts have created many other parliaments. Many nations with parliaments have to some degree emulated the British "three-tier" model known as the Westminster system. Most countries in Europe and the Commonwealth have similarly organised parliaments with a largely ceremonial head of state who formally opens and closes parliament, a large elected lower house and a smaller, upper house. The Parliament of the United Kingdom has been described as characterised by the stability of its governing institutions and its capacity to absorb change.

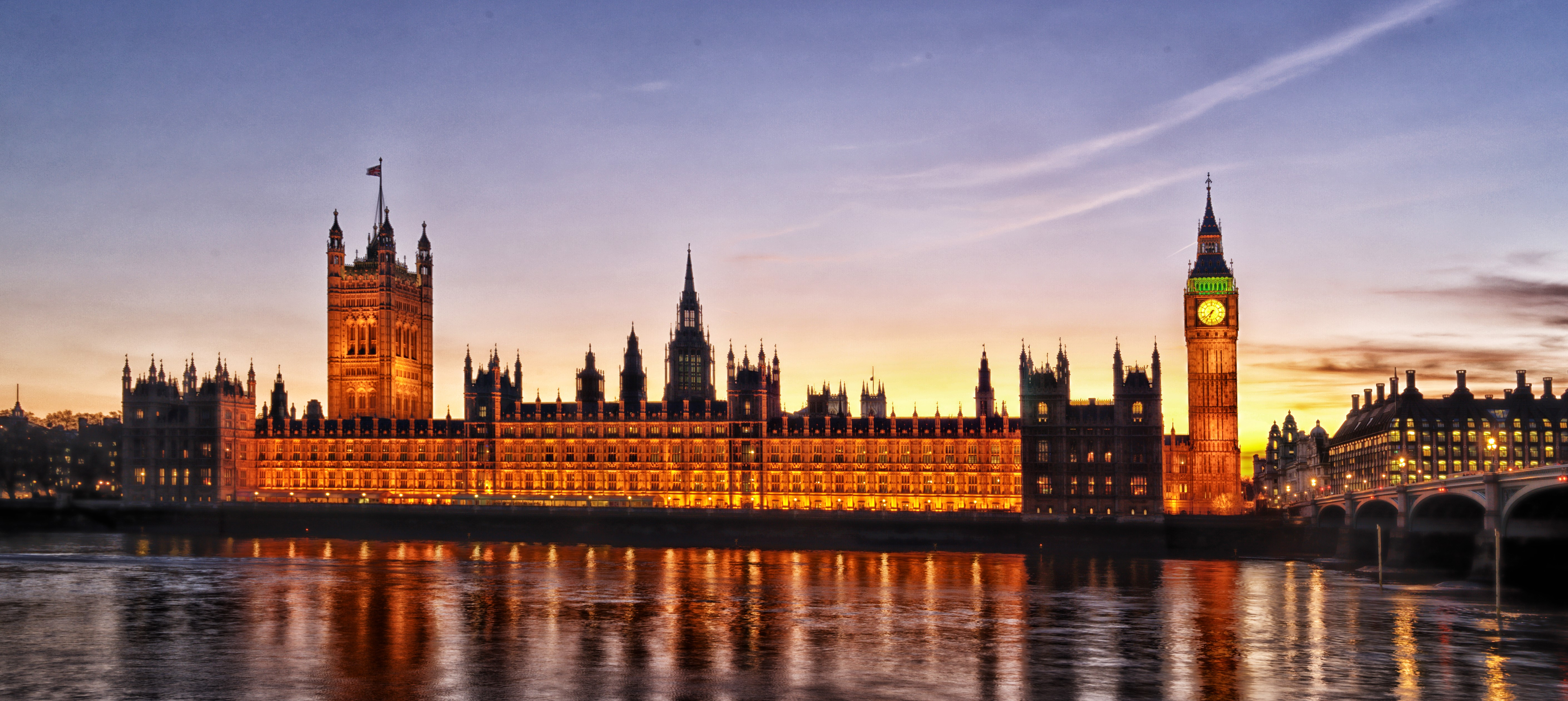
The Palace of Westminster, London

In the United Kingdom, Parliament consists of the House of Commons, the House of Lords, and the Monarch. The House of Commons is composed of 650 members who are directly elected by British citizens to represent single-member constituencies. The leader of a party that wins more than half the seats, or less than half but is able to gain the support of smaller parties to achieve a majority in the house, is invited by the Monarch to form a government. The House of Lords is a body of long-serving, unelected members: Lords Temporal (92 of whom inherit their titles, of whom 90 are elected internally by members of the House to lifetime seats), 588 of whom have been appointed to lifetime seats, and Lords Spiritual (26 bishops, who are part of the house while they remain in office).

Legislation can originate from either the Lords or the Commons. It is voted on in several distinct stages, called readings, in each house. First reading is merely a formality. Second reading is where the bill as a whole is considered. Third reading is detailed consideration of clauses of the bill.

In addition to the three readings a bill also goes through a committee stage where it is considered in great detail. Once the bill has been passed by one house it goes to the other and essentially repeats the process. If after the two sets of readings, there are disagreements between the versions that the two houses passed it is returned to the first house for consideration of the amendments made by the second. If it passes through the amendment stage Royal Assent is granted and the bill becomes law as an Act of Parliament.

The House of Lords is the less powerful of the two houses as a result of the Parliament Acts 1911 and 1949. These Acts removed the veto power of the Lords over a great deal of legislation. If a bill is certified by the Speaker of the House of Commons as a money bill (i.e. acts raising taxes and similar) then the Lords can only block it for a month. If an ordinary bill originates in the Commons the Lords can only block it for a maximum of one session of Parliament. The exceptions to this rule are things like bills to prolong the life of a Parliament beyond five years.

In addition to functioning as the second chamber of Parliament, the House of Lords was also the final court of appeal for much of the law of the United Kingdom—a combination of judicial and legislative function that recalls its origin in the Curia Regis. This changed in October 2009 when the Supreme Court of the United Kingdom opened and acquired the former jurisdiction of the House of Lords.

Since 1999, there has been a Scottish Parliament in Edinburgh, and, since 2020, a Senedd—or Welsh Parliament—in Cardiff. However, these national, unicameral legislatures do not have complete power over their respective countries of the United Kingdom, holding only those powers devolved to them by Westminster from 1997. All three cannot legislate on defence issues or currency, whilst Northern Ireland and Wales cannot legislate on national taxation (e.g. VAT, or Income Tax), however, following the Scotland Act 2016, the Scottish Parliament has some legislative control over aspects of taxation including some elements of income tax, Air Departure Tax and Aggregates Tax.

Additionally, the bodies in Northern Ireland and Wales can be theoretically dissolved, at any given time, by the British Parliament without the consent of the devolved government. The Scotland Act 2016 made both the Scottish Parliament and Scottish Government permanent components of the constitution in Scotland, and can only be dissolved following a vote in a legally binding referendum if a majority voted in favour of its dissolution.

=== Sweden ===
In Sweden, the half-century period of parliamentary government beginning with Charles XII's death in 1718 and ending with Gustav III's self-coup in 1772 is known as the Age of Liberty. During this period, civil rights were expanded and power shifted from the monarch to parliament.

While suffrage did not become universal, the taxed peasantry was represented in Parliament, although with little influence and commoners without taxed property had no suffrage at all.

=== Poland ===
Changes in Poland's internal situation in the 1980s led to the Round Table Talks which ended in the signing of the famous Round Table Agreement on 5 April 1989. The Agreement spearheaded the evolutionary transformation of the country's political system; independence was regained once again. The document Position on Political Reforms provided grounds for amending the Constitution. The amended Constitution restored the office of the President of the Polish People's Republic and the Senate – both to be elected in free and democratic elections. In the Sejm, the opposition was allocated 35% of the mandates. Thus the so-called "contract" elections could not be fully democratic. The Sejm (first chamber) became superior to the Senate (second chamber). In addition, the institution of National Assembly was established, consisting of the Sejm and the Senate sitting jointly to elect the President of the Polish People's Republic. A declaration of the Solidarity Citizens' Committee heralded the prompt enactment of a new, democratic constitution and electoral law. As a result of Solidarity's success in elections to the Sejm and the Senate, profound reforms of the political system were undertaken by adopting an amendment to the Constitution on 29 December 1989. In the Constitution, the Republic of Poland was defined as a democratic state ruled by law. As the provisional constitution lasted too long, it was decided to adopt a provisional regulation in the form of the so-called Small Constitution. The President signed it on 17 October 1992. The Small Constitution regulated above all the relationship between the executive and legislative powers, on the basis of the doctrine of fusion of powers (parliamentarism). A bicameral parliament was maintained.

After long years of legislative work, on 2 April 1997, the National Assembly adopted The Constitution of the Republic of Poland. It entered into force on 17 October 1997. The new Constitution introduced a "rationalised" parliamentary-cabinet system in Poland. It is the first Constitution of the Third Republic. That was the first Constitution of the Third Republic. The act defined the position of the Sejm and the Senate within the system without using the term "parliament". It adopted the doctrine of fusion of powers, which provided for distinction and balance between the legislative and executive powers (but not separation, as the executive must hold the confidence of the majority of the Sejm). In practice the binding provisions of the Constitution ensure the supremacy of the legislative power. Both chambers are autonomous bodies, independent of each other, with their own powers. The Constitution retained the principle of bicameralism of the legislature. The Sejm and the Senate sitting jointly constitute the National Assembly. Characteristically, the new Constitution conferred very extensive powers on the Sejm. On the other hand, the powers of the Senate are limited, as in the Constitutions of 1921 and 1992.

== Parliamentary system ==
Nations with a bicameral legislature. Nations with a unicameral legislature. Nations with no legislature.

Many parliaments are part of a parliamentary system of government, in which the executive is constitutionally answerable to the parliament from the genetic moment of the birth of Government (Motion of confidence), to the final moment of his termination (Motion of no confidence), through all the commitments that can be added to the government contract from time to time through motions and resolutions. Some restrict the use of the word parliament to parliamentary systems, while others use the word for any elected legislative body. Parliaments usually consist of chambers or houses, and are usually either bicameral or unicameral although more complex models exist, or have existed (see Tricameralism).

In some parliamentary systems, the prime minister is a member of the parliament (e.g. in the United Kingdom), whereas in others they are not (e.g. in the Netherlands). They are commonly the leader of the majority party in the lower house of parliament, but only hold the office as long as the "confidence of the house" is maintained. If members of the lower house lose faith in the leader for whatever reason, they can call a vote of no confidence and force the prime minister to resign. In case of general discontent with the head of government, their replacement can be made very smoothly without all the complications that it represents in the case of a presidential system, where impeachment would be needed to force out the head of government, which process is supposed to be a purely legal, not political matter (although it often becomes politicized).

The parliamentary system can be contrasted with a presidential system, such as the American congressional system, which operates under a stricter separation of powers, whereby the executive does not form part of, nor is it appointed by, the parliamentary or legislative body. In such a system, congresses do not select or dismiss heads of governments, and governments cannot request an early dissolution as may be the case for parliaments. Some states, such as France, have a semi-presidential system which falls between parliamentary and congressional systems, combining a powerful head of state (president) with a head of government, the prime minister, who is responsible to parliament.

In some unconventional parliamentary systems, the prime minister is elected by parliament (this was previously the case in Israel), or the president (head of state) also serves as head of government, and answers to parliament as a prime minister (parliamentary system with an executive president). With notable exceptions, in most parliamentary republics the president (head of state) is not actually elected by the parliament, rather most commonly by popular vote. The president may have a formal or informal role as a check on the parliament, although this is less prevalent in the case when parliament elects the president.

== Women in parliament ==
Share of women in parliament

== List of national parliaments ==
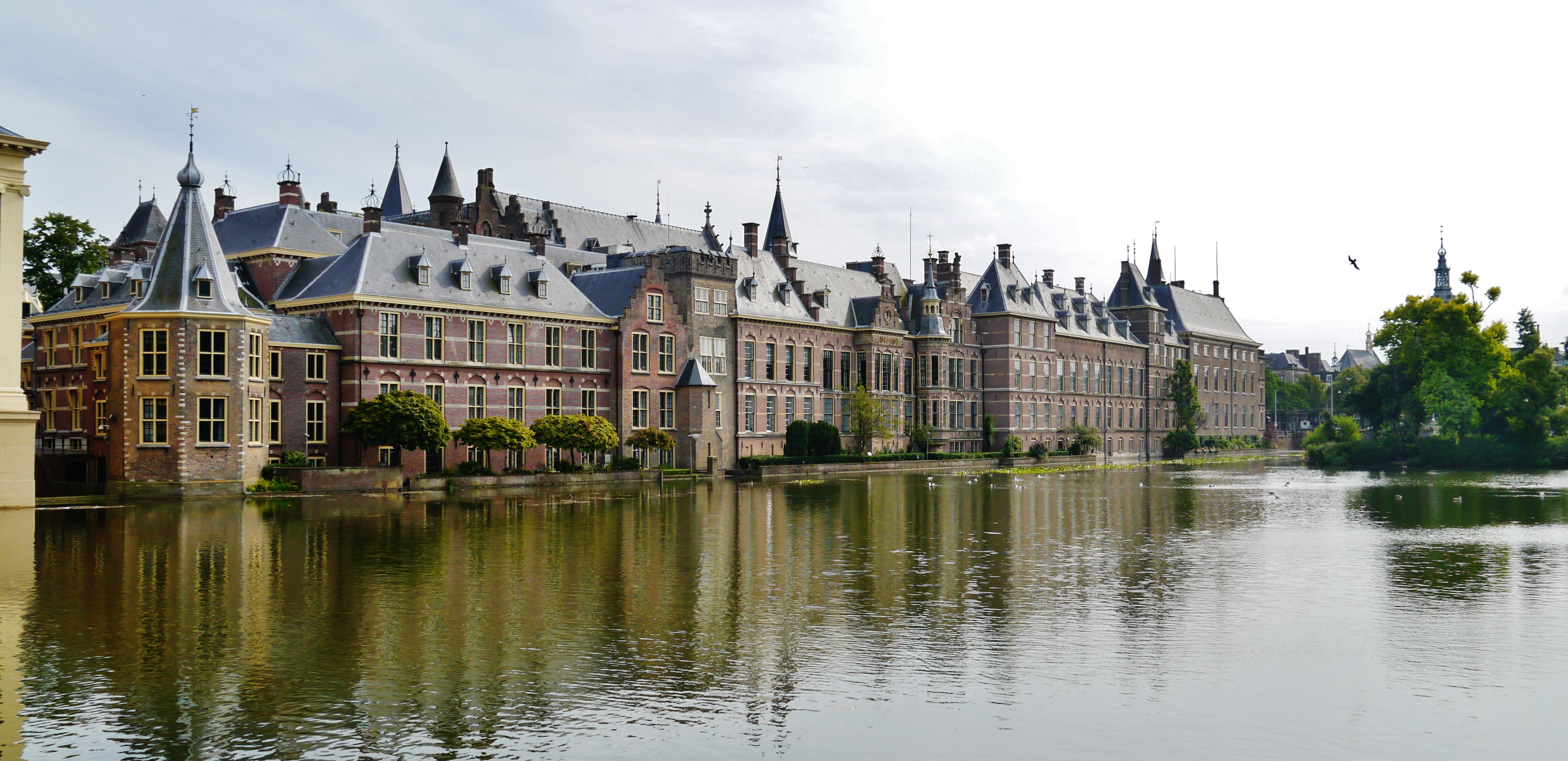
The Binnenhof in The Netherlands is the oldest Parliament buildings in the world still in use.

The centre block of the Parliament of Canada Building in Ottawa

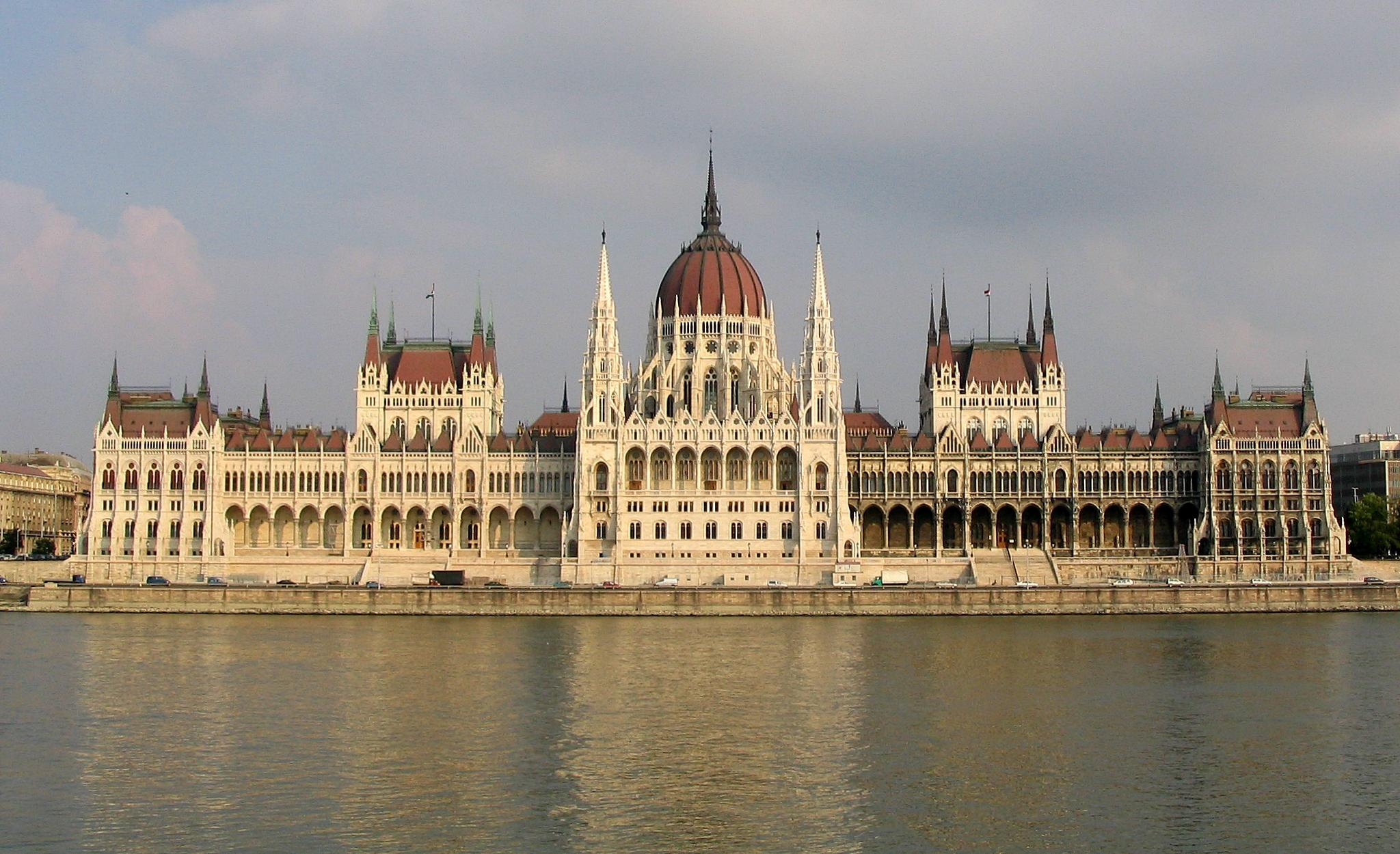
The Hungarian Parliament Building in Budapest

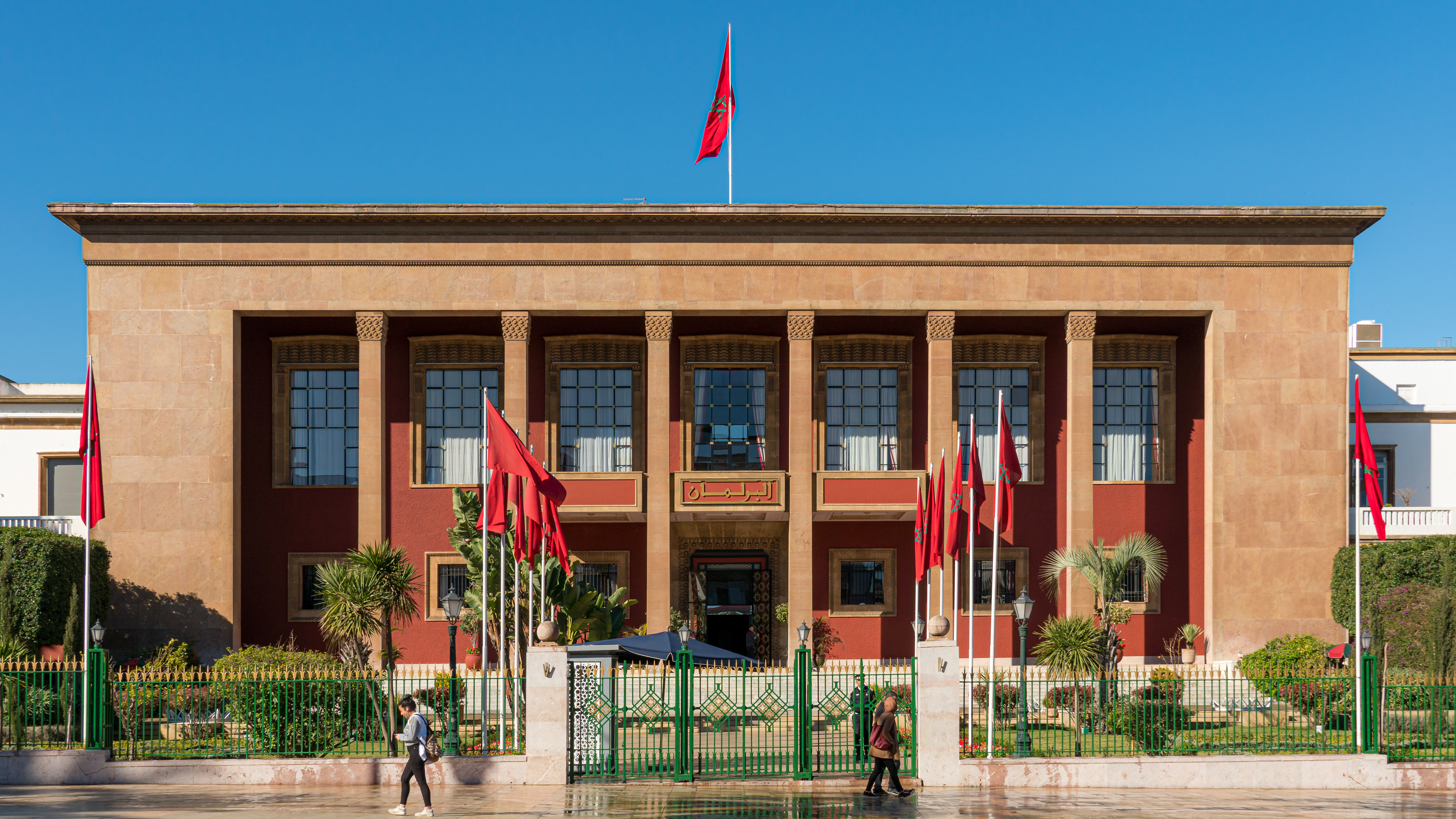
The Parliament of Morocco in Rabat

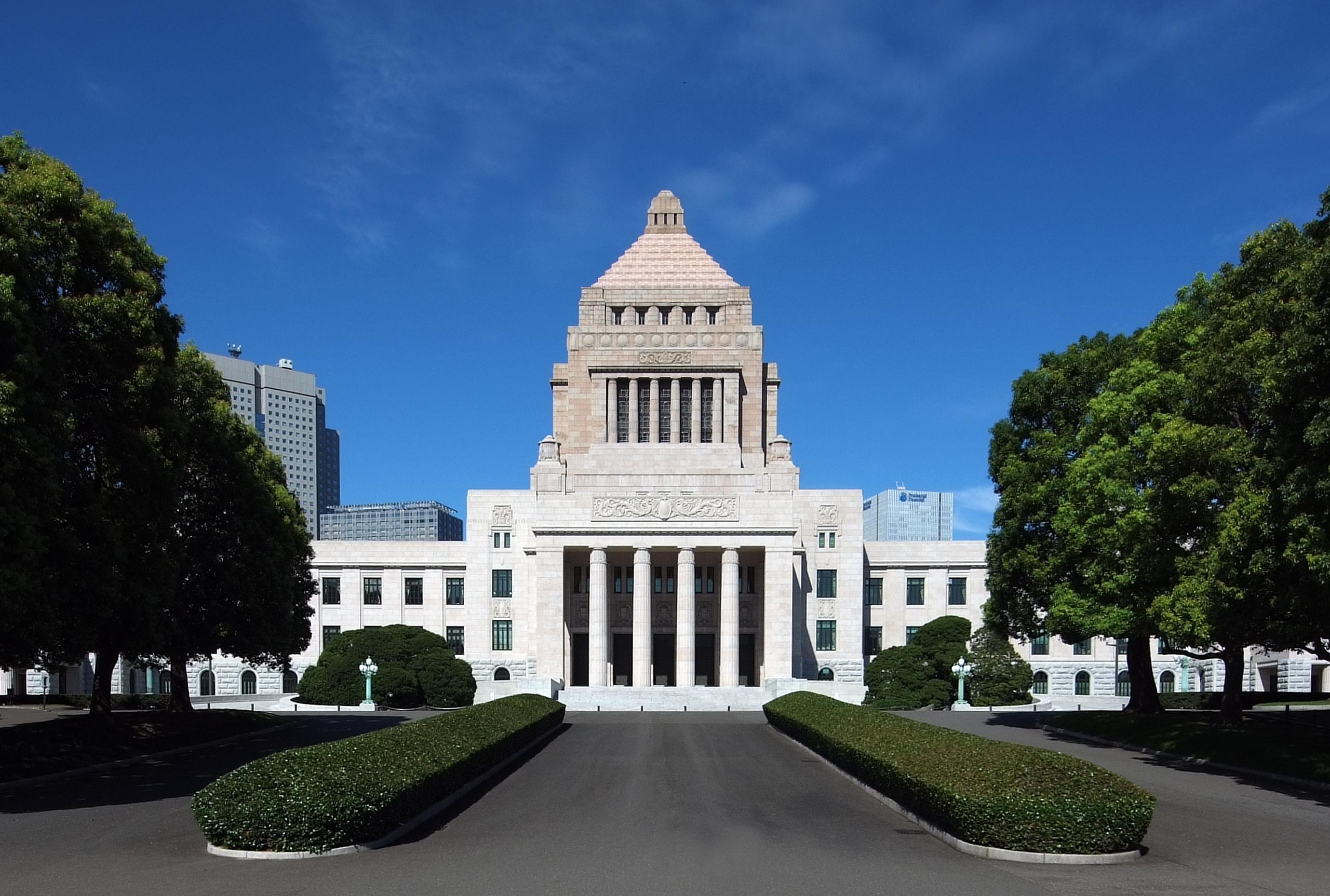
The National Diet Building in Tokyo, Japan

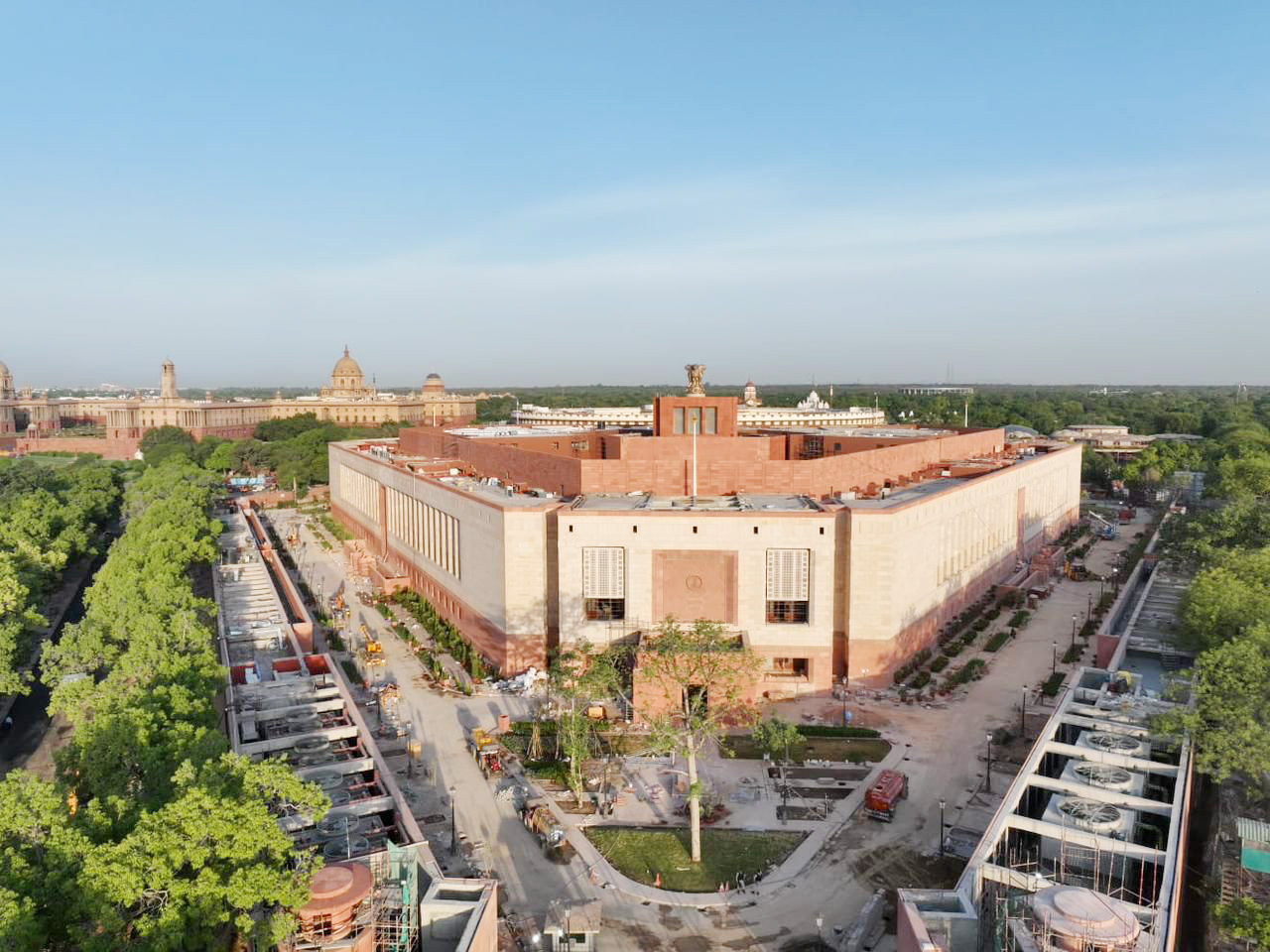
Parliament House, New Delhi, India

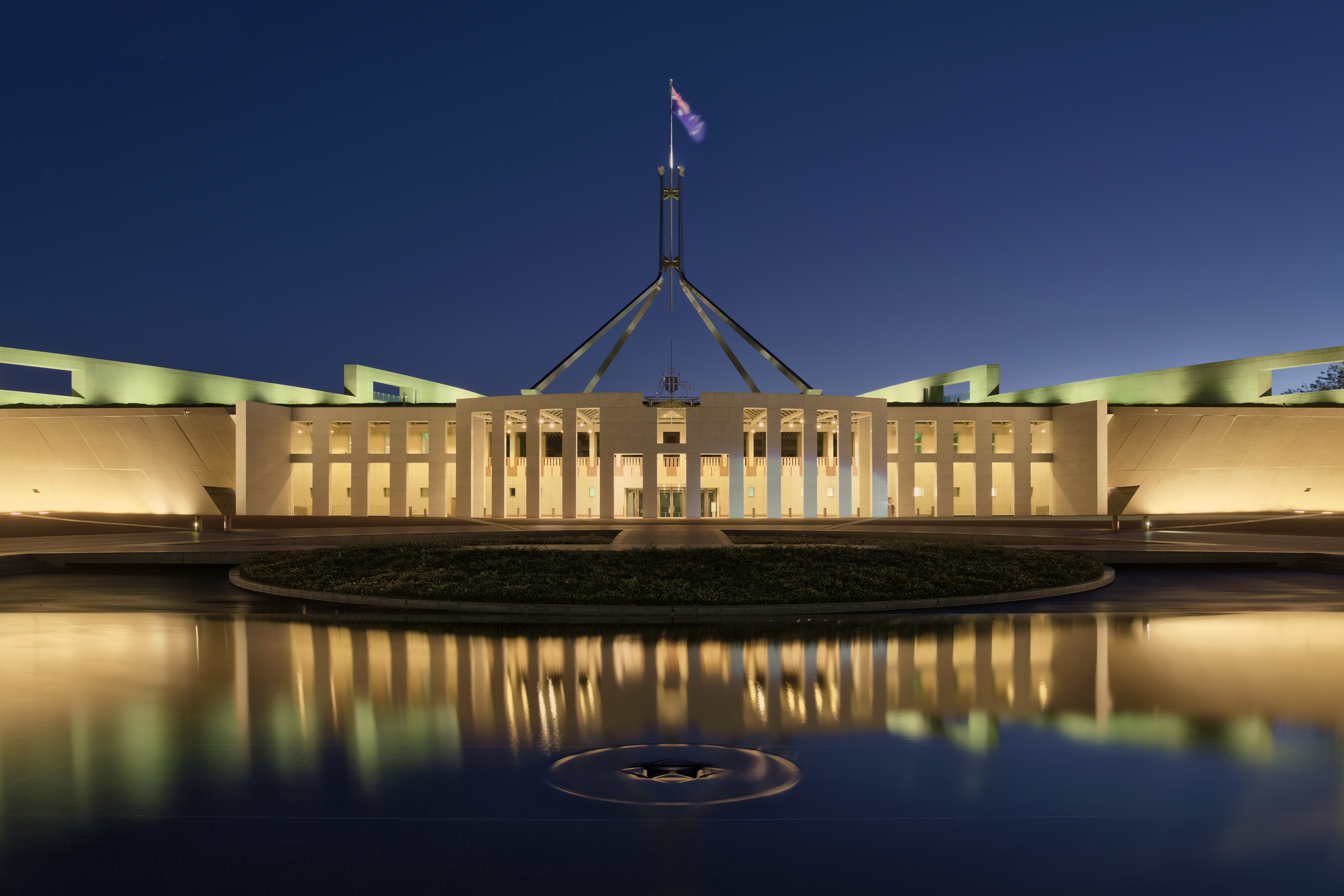
Parliament House, Canberra, Australia

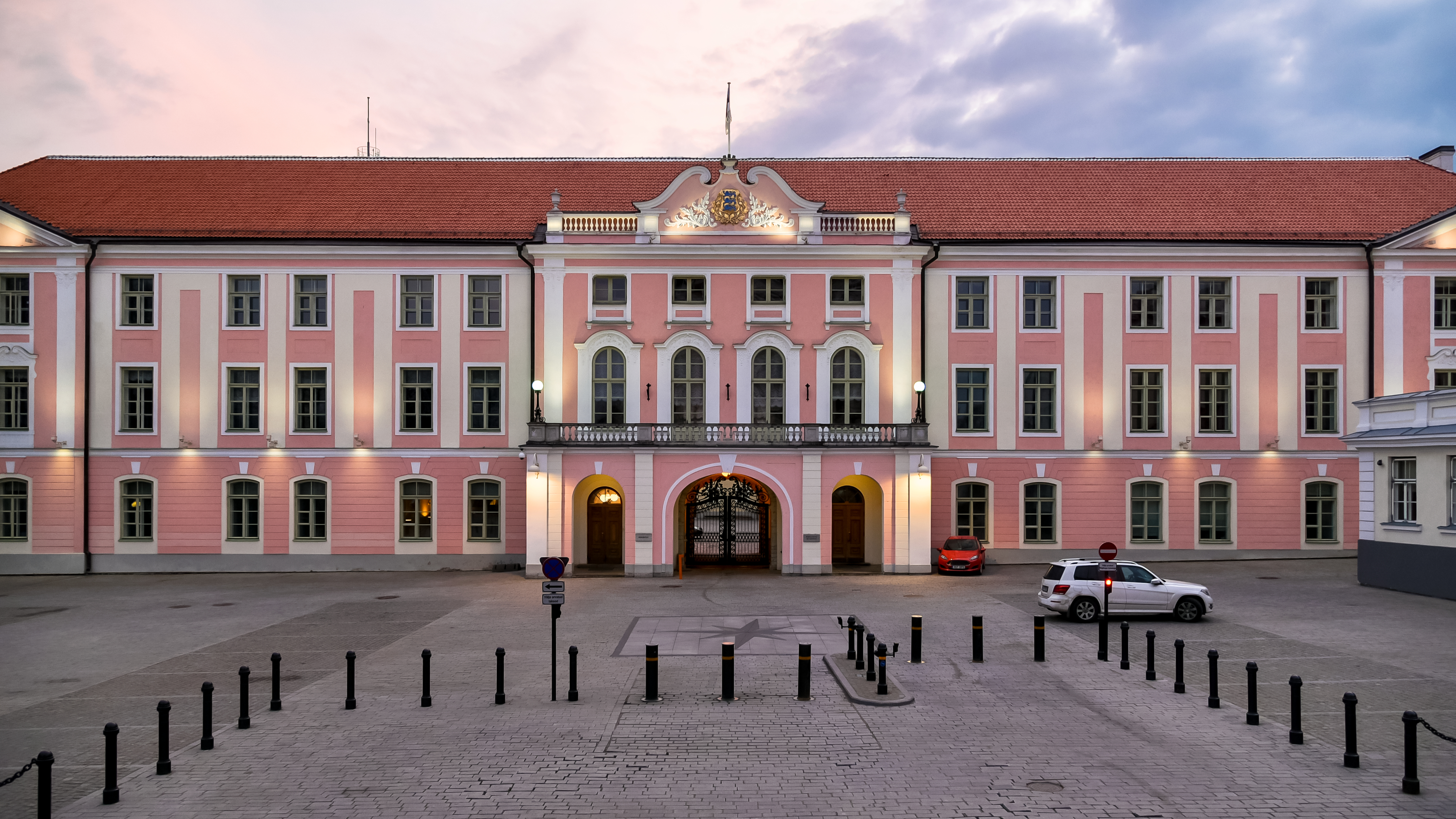
The Parliament House of Riigikogu in Tallinn, Estonia

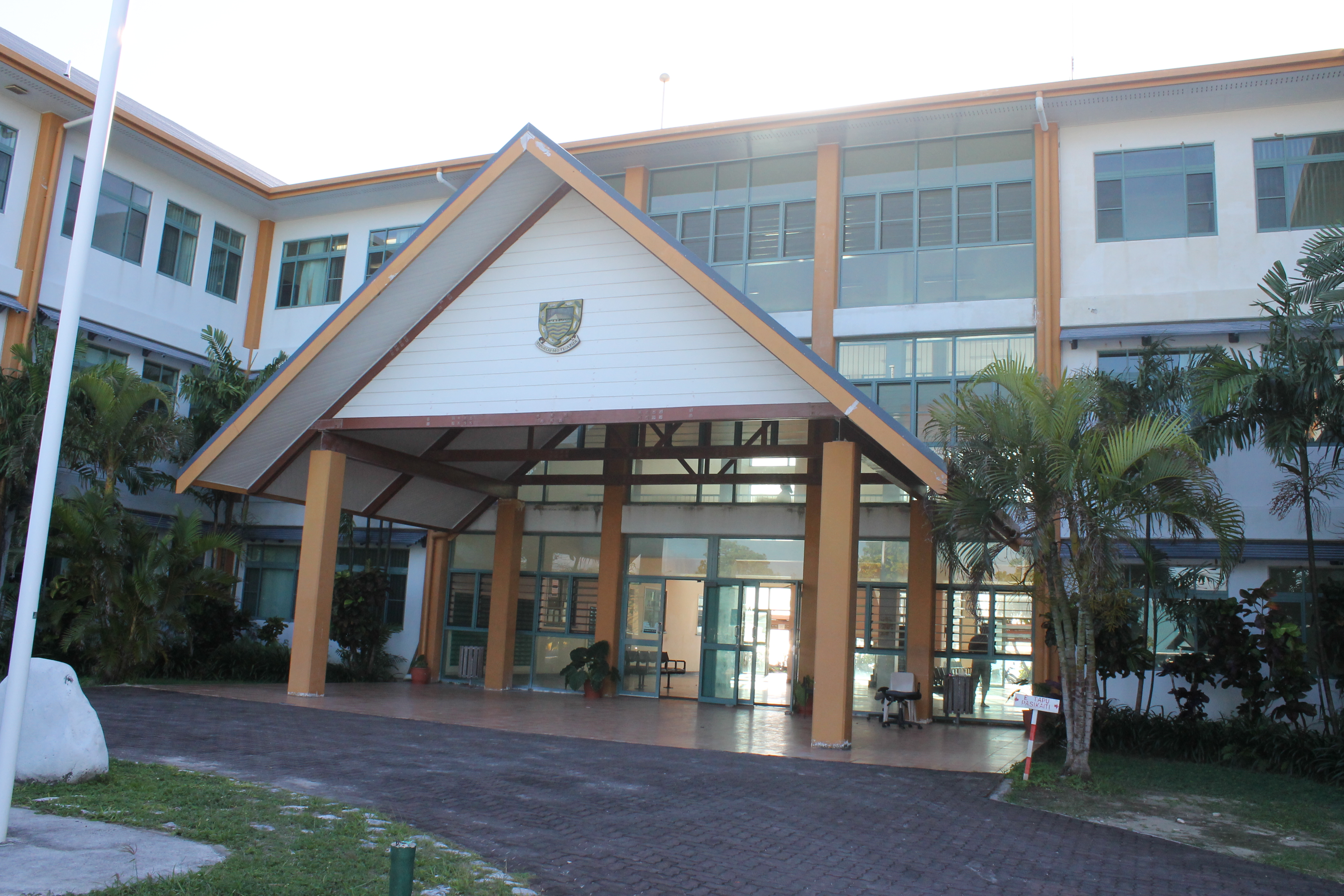
The Parliament of Tuvalu in Funafuti

=== Parliaments of the European Union ===
- European Parliament
- Parliament of Austria (consisting of the National Council and the Federal Council)
- Belgian Federal Parliament (consisting of the Chamber of Representatives and the Senate)
- National Assembly of Bulgaria
- Croatian Parliament
- House of Representatives (Cyprus)
- Parliament of the Czech Republic (consisting of the Chamber of Deputies and the Senate)
- Folketing (Denmark)
- Riigikogu (Estonia)
- Parliament of Finland (Eduskunta)
- Parliament of France (consisting of the National Assembly and the Senate)
- Bundestag and Bundesrat (Germany)
- Hellenic Parliament (Greece)
- National Assembly (Hungary)
- Oireachtas (Ireland) (consisting of the President of Ireland, Dáil Éireann (Lower House) and Seanad Éireann (Senate))
- Parliament of Italy (consisting of the Chamber of Deputies and the Senate)
- Saeima (Latvia)
- Seimas (Lithuania)
- Chamber of Deputies (Luxembourg)
- House of Representatives (Malta)
- States General of the Netherlands (consisting of the Chamber of Representatives and the Senate)
- Storting (Norway)
- National Assembly of the Republic of Poland (consisting of the Sejm and the Senate)
- Assembly of the Republic (Portugal)
- Parliament of Romania (consisting of the Chamber of Deputies and the Senate)
- National Council (Slovakia)
- Parliament of Slovenia (consisting of the National Assembly and the National Council)
- Cortes Generales (Spain) (consisting of the Congress of Deputies and the Senate)
- Riksdag (Sweden)

=== Others ===
- Parliament of Albania
- General Council of Andorra
- Parliament of Australia (consisting of the King, the House of Representatives, and the Senate)
  - The federal government of the Commonwealth of Australia has a bicameral parliament and each of Australia's six states has a bicameral parliament except for Queensland, which has a unicameral parliament.
- Parliament of The Bahamas
- Jatiya Sangsad (Bangladesh)
- Parliament of Barbados
- Parliament of Canada (consisting of the King, an Upper House styled the Senate, and the House of Commons)
  - The federal government of Canada has a bicameral parliament, and each of Canada's 10 provinces has a unicameral parliament.
- National People's Congress of the People's Republic of China
- Løgtingið (Faroe Islands)
- Parliament of Fiji
- Parliament of Ghana
- States of Deliberation of Guernsey
- Althing (Parliament of Iceland) - Oldest surviving parliament
- Parliament of India (consisting of the Lok Sabha and the Rajya Sabha)
- People's Consultative Assembly of Indonesia (consisting of the People's Representative Council and the Regional Representative Council)
- Council of Representatives of Iraq
- Knesset of Israel
- National Diet of Japan (consisting of the House of Representatives and the House of Councillors)
- States Assembly of Jersey
- Parliament of Kazakhstan (consisting of the Mäjilis and the Senate)
- Parliament of Lebanon
- Tynwald, the parliament of the Isle of Man
- Parliament of Malaysia
- Parliament of Moldova
- Parliament of Montenegro
- Parliament of Morocco
- Parliament of Nauru
- Parliament of Nepal (recently reorganised)
- Parliament of New Zealand (consisting of the King and House of Representatives)
- Assembly of the Republic of North Macedonia
- Majlis-e-Shoora, Pakistan
- National Assembly of Serbia
- Parliament of Singapore
- Parliament of South Africa
- National Assembly of South Korea
- Parliament of Sri Lanka
- Legislative Yuan of Taiwan
- National Assembly of Thailand
- Parliament of the Central Tibetan Administration
- Parliament of Trinidad and Tobago
- Grand National Assembly of Turkey
- Verkhovna Rada of Ukraine
- Parliament of the United Kingdom (consisting of the House of Lords and the House of Commons)
- Parliament of Zimbabwe

== List of subnational parliaments ==
=== Australia ===
Australia's States and territories:

- Parliament of New South Wales
- Parliament of Victoria
- Parliament of Queensland
- Parliament of Western Australia
- Parliament of South Australia
- Parliament of Tasmania
- Australian Capital Territory Legislative Assembly
- Parliament of the Northern Territory

=== Belgium ===
In the federal (bicameral) kingdom of Belgium, there is a curious asymmetrical constellation serving as directly elected legislatures for three "territorial" regions—Flanders (Dutch), Brussels (bilingual, certain peculiarities of competence, also the only region not comprising any of the 10 provinces) and Wallonia (French)—and three cultural communities—Flemish (Dutch, competent in Flanders and for the Dutch-speaking inhabitants of Brussels), Francophone (French, for Wallonia and for Francophones in Brussels) and German (for speakers of that language in a few designated municipalities in the east of the Walloon Region, living alongside Francophones but under two different regimes):

- Flemish Parliament serves both the Flemish Community and the region of Flanders (in all matters of regional competence, its decisions have no effect in Brussels-Capital Region)
- Parliament of the French Community
- Parliament of the German-speaking Community
- Parliament of Wallonia
- Parliament of the Brussels-Capital Region (within the capital's regional assembly, however, there also exist two Community Commissions, a Dutch-speaking one and a Francophone one, for various matters split up by linguistic community but under Brussels' regional competence, and even "joint community commissions" consisting of both for certain institutions that could be split up but are not.

=== Brazil ===
- Legislative Assembly of Acre
- Legislative Assembly of Alagoas
- Legislative Assembly of Amapá
- Legislative Assembly of Amazonas
- Legislative Assembly of Bahia
- Legislative Assembly of Ceará
- Legislative Assembly of Espírito Santo
- Legislative Assembly of Goiás
- Legislative Assembly of Maranhão
- Legislative Assembly of Mato Grosso
- Legislative Assembly of Mato Grosso do Sul
- Legislative Assembly of Minas Gerais
- Legislative Assembly of Pará
- Legislative Assembly of Paraíba
- Legislative Assembly of Paraná
- Legislative Assembly of Pernambuco
- Legislative Assembly of Piauí
- Legislative Assembly of Rio de Janeiro
- Legislative Assembly of Rio Grande do Norte
- Legislative Assembly of Rio Grande do Sul
- Legislative Assembly of Rondonia
- Legislative Assembly of Roraima
- Legislative Assembly of Santa Catarina
- Legislative Assembly of Sergipe
- Legislative Assembly of São Paulo
- Legislative Assembly of Tocantins
- Legislative Chamber of the Federal District

=== Canada ===
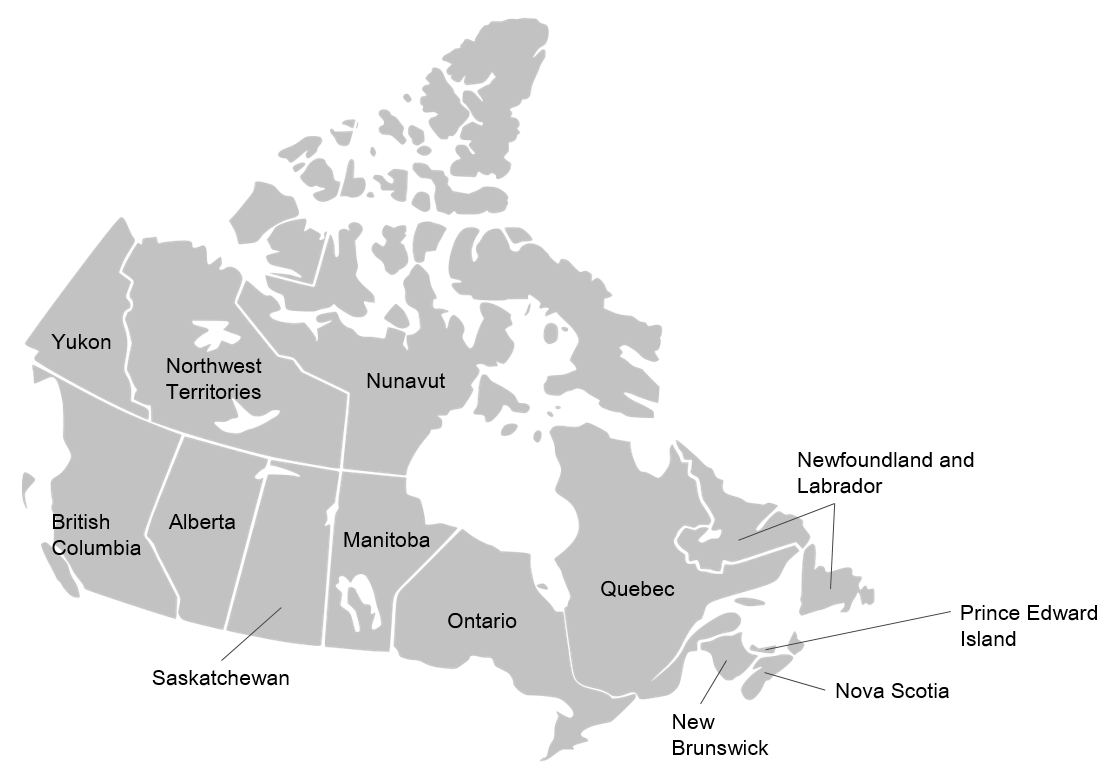

Canada's provinces and territories:

- Parliament of Ontario
- Quebec Legislature
- General Assembly of Nova Scotia
- New Brunswick Legislature
- Manitoba Legislature
- Parliament of British Columbia
- General Assembly of Prince Edward Island
- Saskatchewan Legislature
- Alberta Legislature
- General Assembly of Newfoundland and Labrador
- Legislative Assembly of the Northwest Territories
- Yukon Legislative Assembly
- Legislative Assembly of Nunavut

=== China ===
- Legislative Council of Hong Kong
- Legislative Assembly of Macau

=== Denmark ===
- Inatsisartut
- Løgting

=== Finland ===
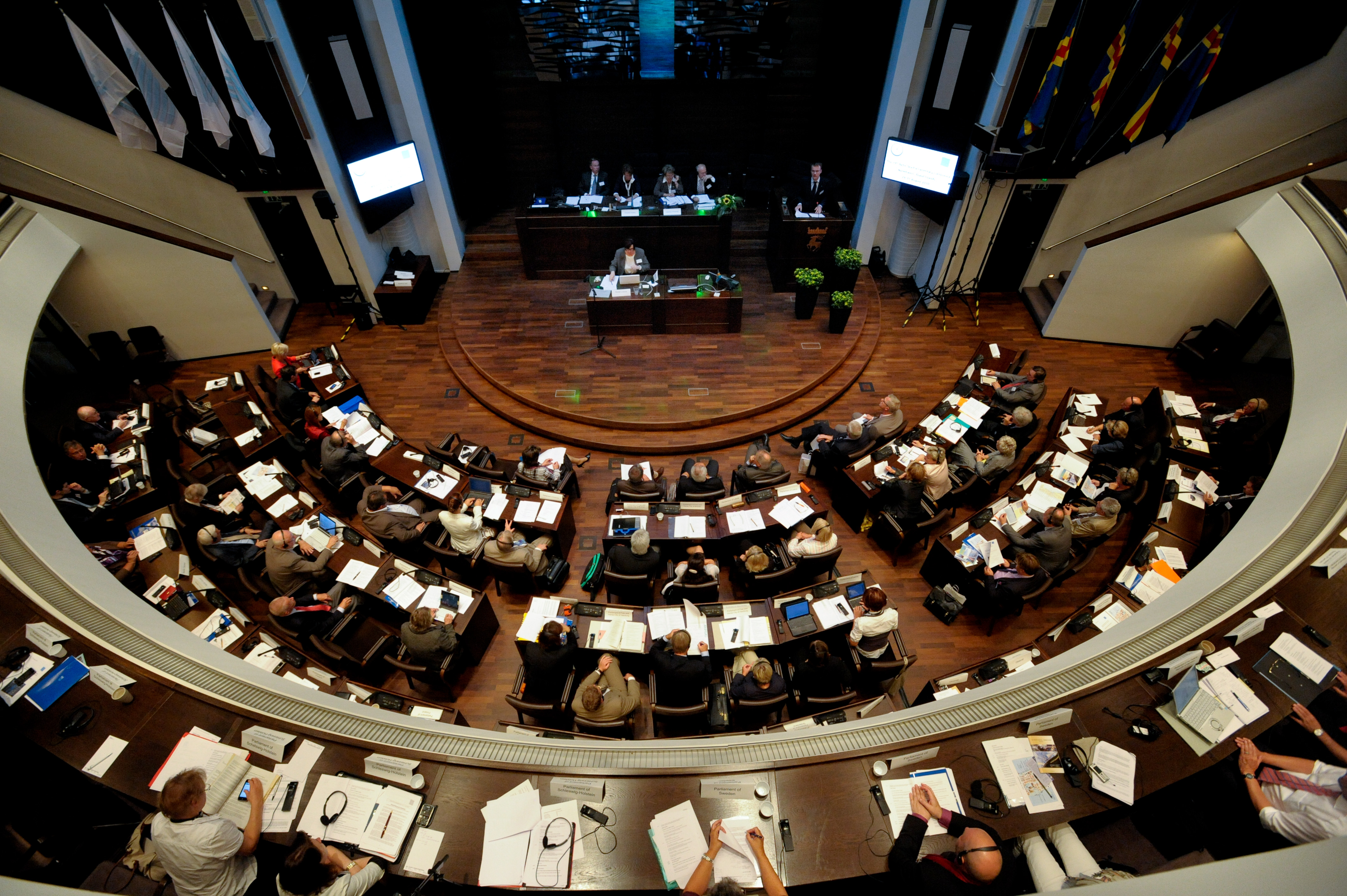
Parliament of Åland

- Åland

=== Germany ===
- State legislatures of Germany

Except for the city-states of Berlin, Bremen and Hamburg, where the city council is also the state parliament, all state parliaments are called Landtag:

- Abgeordnetenhaus of Berlin
- Bremische Bürgerschaft
- Bürgerschaft der Freien und Hansestadt Hamburg
- Landtag of Baden-Württemberg
- Landtag of Bavaria
- Landtag of Brandenburg
- Landtag of Hesse
- Landtag of Mecklenburg-Vorpommern
- Landtag of Lower Saxony
- Landtag of North Rhine-Westphalia
- Landtag of Rhineland-Palatinate
- Landtag of Saarland
- Landtag of Saxony
- Landtag of Saxony-Anhalt
- Landtag of Schleswig-Holstein
- Landtag of Thuringia

=== India ===

==== Indian states and territorial legislative assemblies ====
- Andhra Pradesh Legislative Assembly
- Arunachal Pradesh Legislative Assembly
- Assam Legislative Assembly
- Bihar Legislative Assembly
- Chhattisgarh Legislative Assembly
- Delhi Legislative Assembly
- Goa Legislative Assembly
- Gujarat Legislative Assembly
- Haryana Legislative Assembly
- Himachal Pradesh Legislative Assembly
- Jammu and Kashmir Legislative Assembly
- Jharkhand Legislative Assembly
- Karnataka Legislative Assembly
- Kerala Legislative Assembly
- Madhya Pradesh Legislative Assembly
- Maharashtra Legislative Assembly
- Manipur Legislative Assembly
- Meghalaya Legislative Assembly
- Mizoram Legislative Assembly
- Nagaland Legislative Assembly
- Odisha Legislative Assembly
- Puducherry Legislative Assembly
- Punjab Legislative Assembly
- Rajasthan Legislative Assembly
- Sikkim Legislative Assembly
- Tamil Nadu Legislative Assembly
- Telangana Legislative Assembly
- Tripura Legislative Assembly
- Uttar Pradesh Legislative Assembly
- Uttarakhand Legislative Assembly
- West Bengal Legislative Assembly

==== Indian states legislative councils ====
- Andhra Pradesh Legislative Council
- Bihar Legislative Council
- Karnataka Legislative Council
- Maharashtra Legislative Council
- Telangana Legislative Council
- Uttar Pradesh Legislative Council

=== Netherlands ===
- Provincial council (Netherlands)
- States General of the Netherlands

=== Philippines ===
- Bangsamoro Parliament

=== Portugal ===
- Legislative Assembly of the Azores
- Legislative Assembly of Madeira

=== Sri Lanka ===
- Provincial Councils (Sri Lanka)

=== Trinidad and Tobago ===
- Tobago House of Assembly

=== United Kingdom ===
- Northern Ireland Assembly
- Scottish Parliament
- Senedd (Welsh Parliament)

== Other parliaments ==
=== Contemporary supranational parliaments ===
List is not exhaustive

- Pan-African Parliament
- Central American Parliament
- Latin American Parliament
- European Parliament

=== Equivalent national legislatures ===
- Majlis, e.g. in Iran
- in Indonesia: People's Consultative Assembly, consists of People's Representative Council (elected, legislative lower house) and Regional Representative Council (elected, legislative upper house with limited powers)

=== Defunct ===
- Diet of Galicia and Lodomeria (1861–1918)
- Parliament of Southern Ireland (1921–1922)
- People's Parliament (1940s)
- Silesian Parliament (1922–1945)
- Parliament of Northern Ireland (1921–1973)
- Batasang Pambansâ (1978–1986)
- National Assembly of the Republic of China (1913–2005)

== See also ==
- Congress
- Delegated legislation
- Democratic mundialization
- Government
- History of democracy
- Inter-Parliamentary Union
- Legislation
- Non-human electoral candidate
- Parliamentary procedure
- Parliamentary records
- Parliament of the World's Religions
- List of current presidents of assembly
