= Marko Lotrič =

Slovenian politician and businessman

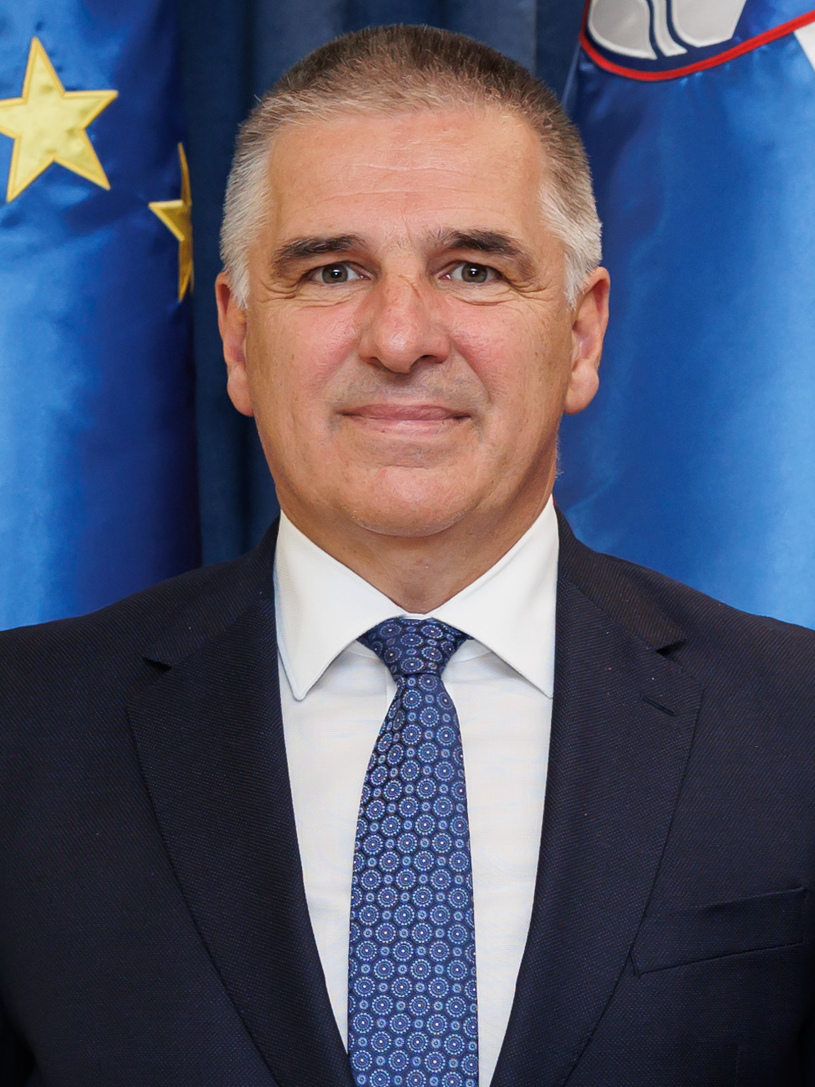
- Lotrič in 2023

President of the National Council of the Republic of Slovenia
- Incumbent
- Assumed office 12 December 2022
- Preceded by: Alojz Kovšca

President of Focus of Marko Lotrič
- Incumbent
- Assumed office 18 January 2025
- Preceded by: Position established

Personal details
- Born: 6 May 1963 (age 63) Kranj, SR Slovenia, Yugoslavia
- Party: Focus of Marko Lotrič (2025–)
- Spouse: Mojca Lotrič (1985–)
- Children: 3

Marko Lotrič (born 6 May 1963) is a Slovenian businessperson and politician. Since December 2022, he is serving as President of the National Council of the Republic of Slovenia. In January 2025, he founded his own political party Fokus.

== Early life ==
Marko Lotrič was born on 6 May 1963 in Kranj. He grew up on a farm in Selca in a family with a brother and a sister. He also attended primary school in Selca. He later enrolled at the School Center Kranj – Secondary Technical School, specializing in electrical engineering.

== Business career ==
Lotrič obtained his first employment at the company Niko Železniki, where he worked as a toolmaker. At the invitation of a neighbor, he also worked at the company Tehtnica Železniki.

He began his independent professional path by opening a business for the calibration of scales, weights, and pipettes. His mentor in the field was Jože Nograšek. In 1991, he founded the Lotrič Metrology Group, which operates ten companies in eight countries and employs 190 people. In Slovenia, the companies Lotrič Certificiranje and PSM Merilni sistemi also operate. In 2012, the company received the Republic of Slovenia Award for Business Excellence.

In 2017, the Lotrič family signed a family constitution, in which he committed to transferring company leadership by the age of 60. Upon assuming the position of President of the National Council in December 2022, Lotrič handed over company management to his youngest daughter Maja Brelih Lotrič.

Lotrič is a member of the Slovenian Entrepreneurs Club and heads the Association of Employers of Crafts and Small Business of Slovenia.

== Politics ==
Lotrič was elected to the National Council of the Republic of Slovenia as a representative of employers. On 12 December 2022, he assumed the position of President of the Council.

On 18 January 2025, at Brdo pri Kranju, he founded his own party Focus of Marko Lotrič and was elected as its president. He identified craftsmen and entrepreneurs as the main electoral base of Fokus.

== Personal life ==
He is married and the father of three children. In addition to his native language, he also speaks English, Croatian, and Serbian.
