= Parliamentary records =

Superlative attributes among the world's parliaments

Among the parliaments of the world, there are those with claims to have set a "record" as being the oldest, the largest, or the first to have undertaken some legislative reform.

== Oldest ==
The first recorded legislative body on record is the bicameral ukkim found in Uruk in Iraq that was founded in around 2800 BC.

The oldest recorded parliament still in existence is the Althing, the ruling legislative body of Iceland. It was founded in 930 and originally consisted of 39 local chieftains. Abolished in 1800, it was restored in 1843.

The oldest continuous parliament is the Tynwald of the Isle of Man. Its exact formation date is generally claimed to be 979 but some sources suggest that its origins lie in the early 9th century, which would predate even the Althing.

== Largest ==
The largest legislative assembly is the Chinese National People's Congress, which consists of 2980 indirectly elected members. The largest upper house of any bicameral legislature is the United Kingdom's House of Lords, with 772 appointed (and hereditary) members. The British Parliament is also the only bicameral assembly in the world to have an upper chamber that is larger than the lower.

The largest seat to population ratio is in India where each seat has a population average of 1,568,965.

== Smallest ==
The smallest legislative assembly in any sovereign state is the Pontifical Commission for Vatican City State, consisting of 7 cardinals who advise and counsel the Pope. Overseas territories such as Cocos, Christmas and Norfolk Islands, Falkland and Pitcairn Islands all have legislatures of under 10 members.

The smallest representation of population per seat is in the Pitcairn Island Council which has a population of 35 and 10 legislative seats meaning each seat has a population of 3.5.

== Women's suffrage ==
The first administration to introduce the suffrage of women into its constitution was Pitcairn Islands in 1838, although it had no legal standing. South Australia introduced female suffrage in 1861 and the Territory of Wyoming allowed women the vote in 1869, with the Isle of Man following in 1881.

The first country to allow women the vote was New Zealand in 1893.

== See also ==
- Parliamentary records of the United Kingdom
- Records of members of the Parliament of Canada
