= Blaž Kavčič (politician) =

Slovenian politician and economist

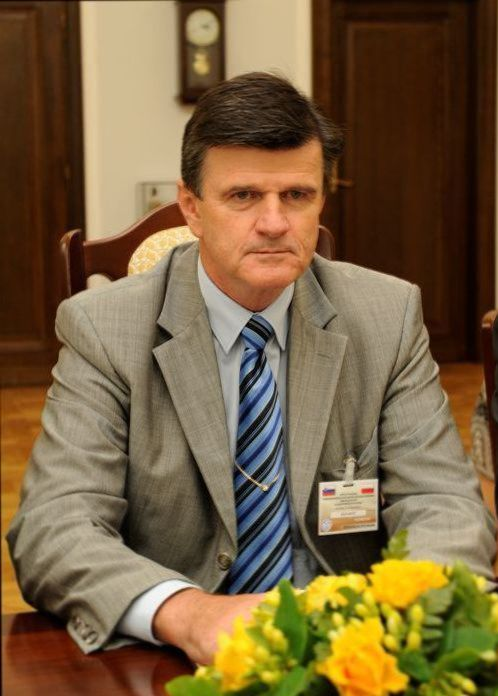
Blaž Kavčič (2011)

Blaž Kavčič (born 3 October 1951 in Ljubljana) is a Slovenian politician and economist.

From 2007 to 2012, Kavčič was president of the National Council (Slovenian: Državni svet). He was elected to the council by electors of the Kranj part of Upper Carniola in November 2007.

He lives with his family in Forme, Škofja Loka municipality.
