= Parliamentary records of the United Kingdom =

Parliamentary records of the United Kingdom covers the period from the creation of the Kingdom of Great Britain in 1707, including records from the Parliament of Great Britain and of the Parliament of the United Kingdom.

== Longest Parliament ==
The longest parliament to continuously sit in any of the United Kingdom’s constituent countries was England’s Cavalier Parliament, which sat for nearly 18 years from 8 May 1661 until 24 January 1679.

While the Long Parliament legally sat for nearly 20 years from 3 November 1640 until 16 March 1660 (having passed an Act of Parliament stipulating it could not be dissolved except by consent of its members), it did not continuously sit for that time. It was purged by Oliver Cromwell in 1648 and disbanded in 1653. It reconvened in February 1660 only to dissolve itself the following month.

The longest Parliament of the United Kingdom was the 37th Parliament elected at the 1935 election. It sat for almost 10 years throughout the Second World War, being dissolved in 1945.

== Shortest Parliament ==
The aptly named Short Parliament of England was the shortest parliament to sit in any of the United Kingdom’s constituent countries. It sat for just three weeks from 13 April until 5 May 1640.

The shortest Parliament of the United Kingdom was the 3rd Parliament elected at the 1806 election. It sat for 138 days from 15 December 1806 until 27 April 1807.

== Longest sitting ==
The longest single sitting of the House of Commons lasted from 16:00 on 31 January 1881 to 09:30 on 2 February, a duration of 41.5 hours. The session centred on "Protection of Person and Property in Ireland".

The longest single sitting of the House of Lords lasted from 11:00 on 10 March 2005 to 19:31 on 11 March 2005, a duration of 32.5 hours (excluding breaks). The sitting centred on consideration of Commons amendments to the Prevention of Terrorism Bill.

== Most divisions ==
The highest number of divisions in a single day in the House of Commons is 64 on 23–24 March 1971, of which 57 occurred between midnight and noon.

== Longest speech ==
The longest continuous speech on record is that of Henry Peter Brougham on 7 February 1828 when he spoke for six hours on law reform. He subsequently set the same record in the House of Lords on 7 October 1831 again speaking for six hours during the second reading of the Reform Act.

Since stricter standing orders were introduced, the longest back-bench speech was given by Ivan Lawrence on 5–6 March 1985 speaking for 263 minutes against the Water Fluoridation Bill.

== Most votes cast ==
The most votes cast in a single division is 660 in the vote of no confidence (350–310) against the government of the Marquess of Salisbury on 11 August 1892. There were 665 out of 670 Members taking part in the division as each side put up two tellers to count the votes, and the Speaker of the House of Commons remained in the Chair. Two seats were vacant, and only three Members failed to take part, two being ill and one absent in Australia.

== Fewest votes cast ==
The fewest votes cast in a single division is one; the vote was on a motion by Labour MP Ronald Brown to adjourn debate on the British Railways Bill, and took place at 01:33 on 24 July 1974.

The single vote against Brown's motion was cast by Conservative MP Bernard Braine; Labour MPs Bob Cryer and Phillip Whitehead acted as Tellers for the Ayes, while Conservative MPs Norman Tebbit and Roger Moate acted as Tellers for the Noes. Nobody was recorded as having voted in favour.

Since a quorum was not present, the question was declared not decided, and the business under consideration stood over until the next sitting of the House.

== See also ==
- Parliamentary records
