= Forme, Škofja Loka =

Forme
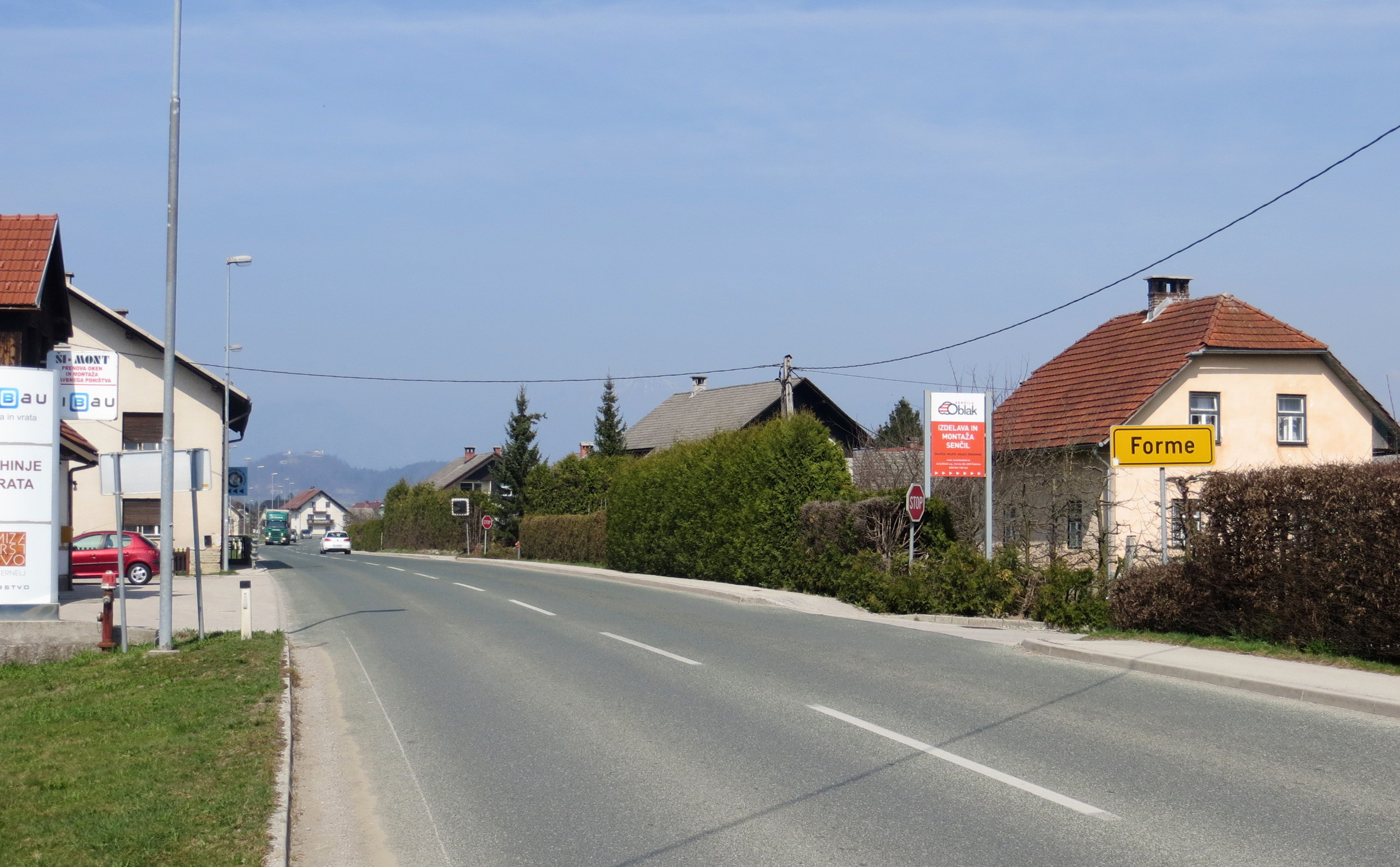

- Location in Slovenia
- Coordinates: 46°11′28.28″N 14°19′27.74″E
- Country: Slovenia
- Traditional region: Upper Carniola
- Statistical region: Upper Carniola
- Municipality: Škofja Loka

Area
  - Total: 0.56 km^{2} (0.22 sq mi)
- Elevation: 369.8 m (1,213 ft)

Population (2023)
  - Total: 176

Forme (pronounced [ˈfoːɾmɛ]; German: Formach) is a settlement in the Municipality of Škofja Loka in the Upper Carniola region of Slovenia.

== Geography ==
Forme lies in the southwestern part of the Sora Plain along the road from Škofja Loka to Kranj. Suha Creek, a tributary of the Sora River, flows west of the settlement. In the western part of the settlement, the land is forested in the Pevno Ravine (Pevenska grapa) and in the foothills rising toward Križna Gora.

== Name ==
Forme was attested in historical sources as Farmarch in 1443, Farmach between 1485 and 1490, and Formach in 1489.
