= National Council (Slovenia) =

Upper house of the Parliament of Slovenia

National Council Državni svet Republike Slovenije
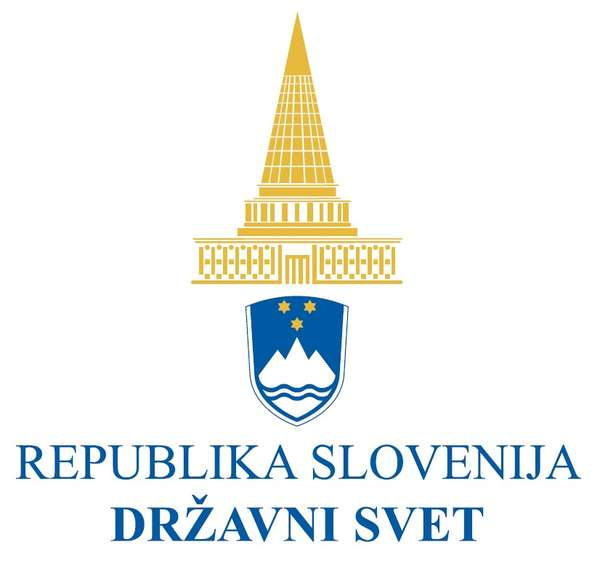

Type
- Type: Upper house

History
- Founded: 23 December 1992; 33 years ago

Leadership
- President: Marko Lotrič since 19 December 2022

Structure
- Seats: 40
- Political groups: Local interests (22); Non-commercial activities, (6); Employers, (4); Employees, (4); Farmers, Crafts, Trades and Independent professionals, (4)
- Length of term: 5 years

Elections
- Voting system: Indirect first-past-the-post
- Last election: Autumn 2022
- Next election: 2027

Meeting place
- Council Chamber; Ljubljana, Slovenia

Website
- www.ds-rs.si

The National Council (Slovene: Državni svet Republike Slovenije or short form državni svet) is according to the Constitution of Slovenia the representative of social, economic, professional and local interest groups in Slovenia.

The Council may be regarded as an upper house within a distinctively incomplete bicameralism; it has a legislative function as a corrective and oversight mechanism for the National Assembly, though it does not itself pass acts. It is not elected directly by the population, but is meant to represent significant interest groups in the country. Councilors are elected for a five-year term. Elections to the National Council are not regulated by the Constitution, but by a two-thirds majority of the National Assembly.

The current president of the National Council (from 19 December 2022) is Marko Lotrič.

== Composition ==
The council has 40 members:

- 22 representatives of local interests,
- 4 representatives of employers,
- 4 representatives of employees,
- 4 representatives of farmers (2), crafts (1) and independent professionals (1),
- 6 representatives of non-commercial activities: higher education (1), education (1), research (1), culture and sports (1), health care (1) and social protection (1).

The latest elections were on 23 November 2022 for the 22 representatives of local interests and on the next day for the 18 representatives of Functional interests.

The 22 representatives of local interests are elected by electoral colleges, themselves elected by the municipal councils.

For this purpose, the municipalities are grouped in 22 electoral districts based on the 58 "administrative units" (upravne enote). These districts vary widely in number of inhabitants. The largest (1.Ljubljana) has more than ten times the population of the smallest district (15.Metlika with Črnomelj).

Every municipal council sends to the electoral college one representative irrespective of its population and one more for every 5.000 inhabitants. In 2022, there were 502 electors in total, the largest district (1.Ljubljana) had 66 electors, the smallest (15.Metlika with Črnomelj) only 6.

Elections are decided by plurality. Ties are decided by lot (in 2022, this was the case in 3 of the 22 districts)

The 18 representatives of functional interests are elected by professional and interest-group associations.

The council is officially nonpartisan, though national political parties exert an influence on the selection of local councilors.

== History ==
The pre-1992 legislature of the Socialist Republic of Slovenia had a tricameral structure, comprising a Sociopolitical Assembly, a Municipalities' Assembly, and an Assembly of United Labor. The National Council informally succeeded the latter two chambers, and is similarly geared toward the representation of local, economic, and occupational interests.

The emblem of the council is a stylized rendition of the Plečnik Parliament, an unrealized 1947 design for a new national legislature by the country's most eminent architect, Jože Plečnik.

== Competences ==
Most of the National Council's powers are advisory in nature, with the chamber mainly intended to serve as an institutional source of oversight of the National Assembly. The Council may:

- propose laws or amendments to the National Assembly
- present a resolution on a matter to the National Assembly
- request a parliamentary inquiry by the National Assembly into a matter
- demand the National Assembly clarify or disambiguate a law
- petition the Constitutional Court to review a law or regulation for compliance with the constitution

The council also possesses a single non-advisory power, the suspensive veto: it may by majority vote suspend any new law within seven days of its passage. Laws suspended by a Council veto can be reconfirmed by the Assembly, but an absolute majority of the chamber is required on second passage. Laws pertaining solely to the state budget are exempt from the veto, and the Council cannot veto the same law a second time.

The most notable use of the suspensive veto occurred on October 11, 2022, when the Council voted to suspend a newly passed law permitting same-sex marriage. The veto was overridden by the Assembly on October 18.

== Presidents of the National Council ==
1. Ivan Kristan (LDS): 23 December 1992 – 17 December 1997
2. Tone Hrovat (SLS): 17 December 1997 – 17 December 2002
3. Janez Sušnik (DeSUS): 17 December 2002 – 12 December 2007
4. Blaž Kavčič (LDS / SMS-Zeleni): 12 December 2007 – 12 December 2012
5. Mitja Bervar (LDS / SMC) 12 December 2012 – 12 December 2017
6. Alojz Kovšca (GAS / Concretely) 12 December 2017 – 19 December 2022
7. Marko Lotrič (Independent / FOKUS) 19 December 2022
