= Alojz Kovšca =

Slovenian politician

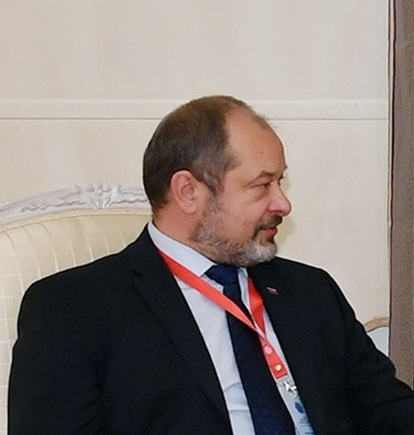

Alojz Kovšca (born 13 September 1965, Čapljina, Bosnia and Herzegovina) is a politician from Slovenia who served as President of the National Council of Slovenia from December 2017 to December 2022.

== Personal life ==
He was born on 13 September 1965 in Čapljina. His father was an officer of Yugoslav People's Army.
