= List of Cleveland State University people =

This list of Cleveland State University people includes notable alumni, students, as well as current and former faculty of Cleveland State University, a public university located in Cleveland, Ohio.

== Presidents ==
- Cecil V. Thomas, 1934–1947
- Joseph C. Nichols, 1947–1948
- Edward Hodnett, 1948–1951
- G. Brooks Earnest, 1952–1965
- Harry Newburn, 1965–1966 (interim)
- Harold Enarson, 1966–1972
- Harry Newburn, 1972–1973 (interim)
- Walter Waetjen, 1973–1988
- John Flower, 1988–1992
- Claire Van Ummersen, 1993–2001
- Michael Schwartz, 2002–2009
- Ronald M. Berkman, 2009–2018
- Harlan M. Sands, 2018–2022
- Laura J. Bloomberg, 2022–present

== Faculty ==
- Angelin Chang, Grammy-award winning classical pianist and professor of music; a graduate of the university's Cleveland-Marshall College of Law
- Michael Dumanis, Russian-American poet and former director of the Cleveland State University Poetry Center
- Lee Fisher, politician and dean of Cleveland-Marshall College of Law
- Thomas W. Hungerford, mathematician and author of many textbooks including Abstract Algebra: An Introduction
- Richard M. Perloff, communication scholar, writer of The Dynamics of Persuasion, currently in its sixth edition, international recognized expert on the subject
- Imad Rahman, Pakistani-American writer, I Dream of Microwaves
- Shuvo Roy, inventor of the artificial kidney
- Sheila Schwartz, fiction writer, creative writing professor
- Chas Smith, author, musician, radio personality, music professor
- Camilla Stivers, Distinguished Professor of Public Administration
- Jearl Walker, author of The Flying Circus of Physics; physics professor

== Coaching staff ==
- Dennis Gates, basketball coach
- Gary Waters, basketball coach

== Notable alumni ==
=== Government ===
- Jane L. Campbell, 56th mayor of Cleveland, first female mayor of Cleveland
- Anthony J. Celebrezze Jr., Ohio Senator, Ohio Secretary of State, Ohio attorney general and gubernatorial candidate for Ohio
- Frank D. Celebrezze Jr., Ohio Court of Appeals judge
- Vlado Dimovski (Ph.D., 1994), Minister in the Government of Slovenia
- Pamela Evette (B.B.A), lt. governor of South Carolina
- Ed Feighan (J.D., 1978), U.S. congressman
- Ed FitzGerald, first Cuyahoga County Council executive, former mayor of Lakewood, Ohio
- George L. Forbes, Cleveland City Council president, Cleveland NAACP president
- Marcia Fudge, chairwoman of the Congressional Black Caucus in the 113th Congress, 18th United States Secretary of Housing and Urban Development
- Daniel Gaul, judge for the Cuyahoga County Common Pleas Court
- Dan Huberty, member of the Texas House of Representatives from Houston
- Frank G. Jackson, 57th mayor of the City of Cleveland
- Frank Lausche, 55th and 57th governor of Ohio, Ohio senator, 47th mayor of Cleveland
- Max Miller, U.S. congressman
- Donald C. Nugent (J.D., 1974), federal district court judge
- Maureen O'Connor (J.D., 1980), former Ohio Supreme Court justice
- Terrence O'Donnell (J.D., 1971), former Ohio Supreme Court justice
- C. J. Prentiss, Ohio state senator, founder of Policy Matters Ohio
- Andrew Puzder (B.A., 1975), CEO of CKE Restaurants/Secretary of Labor-designate (for President-elect Donald Trump)
- Shawn Richards, member of the National Assembly of Saint Kitts and Nevis
- Kahlil Seren (MSUS, 2010), first elected mayor of Cleveland Heights, Ohio
- Carl B. Stokes (J.D., 1956), first African American mayor of a major U.S. city (Cleveland)
- Louis Stokes (J.D., 1953), 15-term Democratic congressman
- Francis E. Sweeney Sr. (J.D., 1963), former Ohio Supreme Court justice
- Ike Thompson, member of the Ohio House of Representatives
- Nina Turner (BA, MA), former Cleveland City Council member, former Ohio state senator, president of Our Revolution
- Lesley B. Wells (J.D., 1974), federal district court judge

=== Sports ===
- Johnny Bedford (attended), wrestler; professional mixed martial artist, formerly with the Ultimate Fighting Championship
- J'Nathan Bullock, professional basketball player
- Norris Cole, two-time NBA Champion basketball player
- M-Dogg 20/Matt Cross, born Matthew Capiccioni (B.A. 2006), professional wrestler
- Jerry Dybzinski, former professional baseball player
- Franklin Edwards, former professional basketball player
- Tristan Enaruna, NBA basketball player
- Gerald Harris (History), all-time record for wins on the wrestling team; current professional mixed martial arts fighter
- D'Moi Hodge, NBA basketball player
- Cedric Jackson, NBA basketball player
- Trey Lewis (born 1992), basketball player in the Israeli Basketball Premier League
- Stipe Miocic (Communications/Marketing), baseball player; professional MMA fighter; two-time UFC Heavyweight Champion
- Georgio Poullas, wrestler
- Clinton Smith, former NBA basketball player
- Darren Tillis, former NBA player

=== Other ===
- Jerome Caja, performance artist
- Gladisa Guadalupe (B.A.), ballet dancer, artistic director and co-founder of the current Cleveland Ballet
- Kid Leo (attended; honorary D.H.L., 2022), general manager and afternoon DJ on Little Steven's Underground Garage on Sirius XM Radio
- Lee Ann Liska (M.B.A.), hospital administrator
- Kenneth A. Loparo, mechanical engineering professor
- J. Everett Prewitt, novelist, former Army officer
- Scott Raab (B.A., 1984), writer, Esquire Magazine
- Tim Russert (J.D., 1976), author; NBC Washington bureau chief; moderator of NBC's Meet the Press
- Margaret Taber, electrical engineer
- Steve Wood, Anglican bishop of the Carolinas and archbishop of the Anglican Church in North America
- Tom Zeller Jr., New York Times journalist and nonfiction author.
