= WCSB (FM) =

Radio station at Cleveland State University

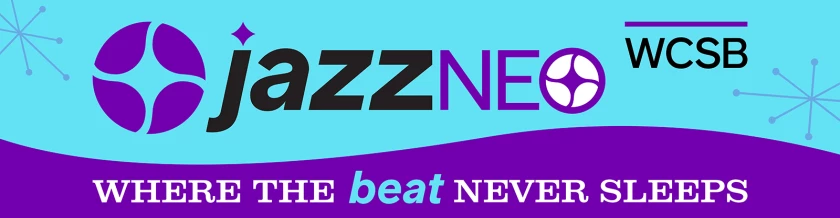
- Cleveland, Ohio; United States
- Broadcast area: Greater Cleveland
- Frequency: 89.3 MHz
- Branding: JazzNEO

Programming
- Format: Jazz
- Affiliations: NPR; PRX; WFMT Jazz Network

Ownership
- Owner: Cleveland State University
- Operator: Ideastream
- Sister stations: WCLV; WCPN; WKSU; WVIZ

History
- First air date: May 10, 1976
- Call sign meaning: "Cleveland State Broadcasting"

Technical information
- Licensing authority: FCC
- Facility ID: 65553
- Class: A
- ERP: 630 watts
- HAAT: 62 meters (203 ft)
- Transmitter coordinates: 41°30′12.00″N 81°40′30.00″W
- Repeater: (90.3-HD2) WCLV (Cleveland)

Links
- Public license information: Public file; LMS
- Website: ideastream.org/jazz

WCSB (89.3 FM) is a non-commercial educational radio station licensed to Cleveland, Ohio, United States, featuring a mainstream jazz format known as "JazzNEO". Owned by Cleveland State University (CSU) and operated by Ideastream Public Media, WCSB serves much of Greater Cleveland and Northeast Ohio as an affiliate of NPR, Public Radio Exchange and the WFMT Jazz Network. WCSB's studios are located at the Idea Center in Downtown Cleveland, while the transmitter resides atop Rhodes Tower on the CSU campus. In addition to a standard analog transmission, WCSB is available online and simulcast on the second HD Radio subchannel of WCLV (90.3 FM).

From its 1976 establishment until October 2025, WCSB operated with a campus radio and free-form format programmed largely by CSU students.

== History ==
WCSB began broadcasting on May 10, 1976, with programming from Cleveland State University students, faculty, and staff members. In addition, members of the Northeast Ohio community not affiliated with the university hosted programs on WCSB.

In 2020, WCSB received a grant from the College Radio Foundation to defray costs of replacing the station's antenna on Rhodes Tower.

As a student-programmed station at Cleveland State University until 2025, WCSB aired a wide variety of music, including blues, folk, psychedelic rock, noise, indie rock, experimental, ambient, jazz fusion, electronic jazz, free jazz as well as traditional jazz, hardcore punk, punk, outlaw country, reggae, soca, salsa, emo, synthpop, darkwave, new wave, minimal wave, electronica, IDM, K-pop, heavy metal, death metal and grindcore, hip hop, turntablism and soul. The station also aired late night talk radio, as well as news, information and music oriented toward many of the ethnic groups represented in Greater Cleveland: Latin, Hispanic, German, Hungarian, Polish, East Asian, Arabic, Congolese, and Slovenian. Programming, information and music with a focus on Northeast Ohio was heavily featured. Weekly public affairs programs focused on a range of topics, from drug prohibition to space exploration.

== Station events ==
At Cleveland State University, WCSB held annual parties and concerts around Halloween. The Halloween Masquerade Ball began in 2009 to show appreciation to the station's listeners and their undying support as a free event offered to the local community. Until 2016, this event was held at the Cleveland Public Theater in the Gordon Square district of Cleveland.

Other events included Radiothon, an annual week-long fundraising event in November, and an annual record fair in the summer.

== Transfer to Ideastream and switch to jazz ==
On October 3, 2025, Ideastream Public Media entered into an eight-year public service operating agreement to operate WCSB, supplanting the station's campus programming with Ideastream's "JazzNEO" jazz format. The transfer was announced by CSU president Laura J. Bloomberg to WCSB management and staff via a Zoom call at 11 a.m., and staff were escorted out of the building shortly thereafter by university police. Bloomberg later claimed the staff were in the studios broadcasting without authorization, and had been granted access by the same campus police after keycard lock access had been revoked earlier that morning. Negotiations between the two parties had been in place for several months but were bound to a non-disclosure agreement. The handover was made without input from students or community members. Staff retrospectively told local media of being nervous when scholarships promised to WCSB staff for the academic year failed to materialize.

As part of the agreement, Bloomberg received a seat on Ideastream's board of directors and Ideastream obtained right of first refusal to purchase WCSB outright. Ideastream also offered internships and career opportunities for CSU students. Ideastream was previously the recipient of a $1 million grant for new studio facilities for JazzNEO at the Idea Center. Along with a circulated petition, varied protests took place on the CSU campus and in front of the Idea Center. Cleveland City Council passed a non-binding resolution on October 20 supporting the former format. Protestors called on Cuyahoga Arts & Culture to rescind taxpayer-supported funding to Ideastream, but the funding was granted during a November 12, 2025, open meeting; an Ideastream spokesperson said there "isn’t anything new to add to the conversation". Bloomberg defended the lease in an interview with The Cleveland Stater, saying, "it's just that my answer isn't going to be satisfactory... and it's, 'no, I wouldn't have done it any differently'"; Bloomberg also denounced some of the protests and conduct on social media for a lack of civility.

Former WCSB staff, former manager Alison Bomgardner and the "Friends of XCSB" sued both CSU's board of trustees and Bloomberg on January 15, 2026, claiming CSU violated Ohio's Open Meetings Act and the student's first amendment rights, and alleging Bloomberg "secretly" sought the deal after having grown "weary" with WCSB staff criticizing university policies on-air. Ideastream was not named as a defendant. Former WCSB staffers launched "XCSB Alternative Media," an internet-only station, on March 1, 2026.

== Programming ==
Local personalities on WCSB include John Simna, Dee Perry and Dan Polletta; the remainder are syndicated via WFMT's Jazz Network. The mainstream jazz format launched on February 26, 2024, and continues to be simulcast over the second HD Radio subchannel of WCLV.
