= Keep Punching =

Keep Punching may refer to:

- A propaganda poster used by the United States of America during World War II; see Propaganda during World War II
- Keep Punching (1939 film), an American film
- Keep Punching (2013 film), a documentary film produced by Killer Goose Films
