= Vlado Dimovski =

Slovene economist, philosopher, politician, university professor

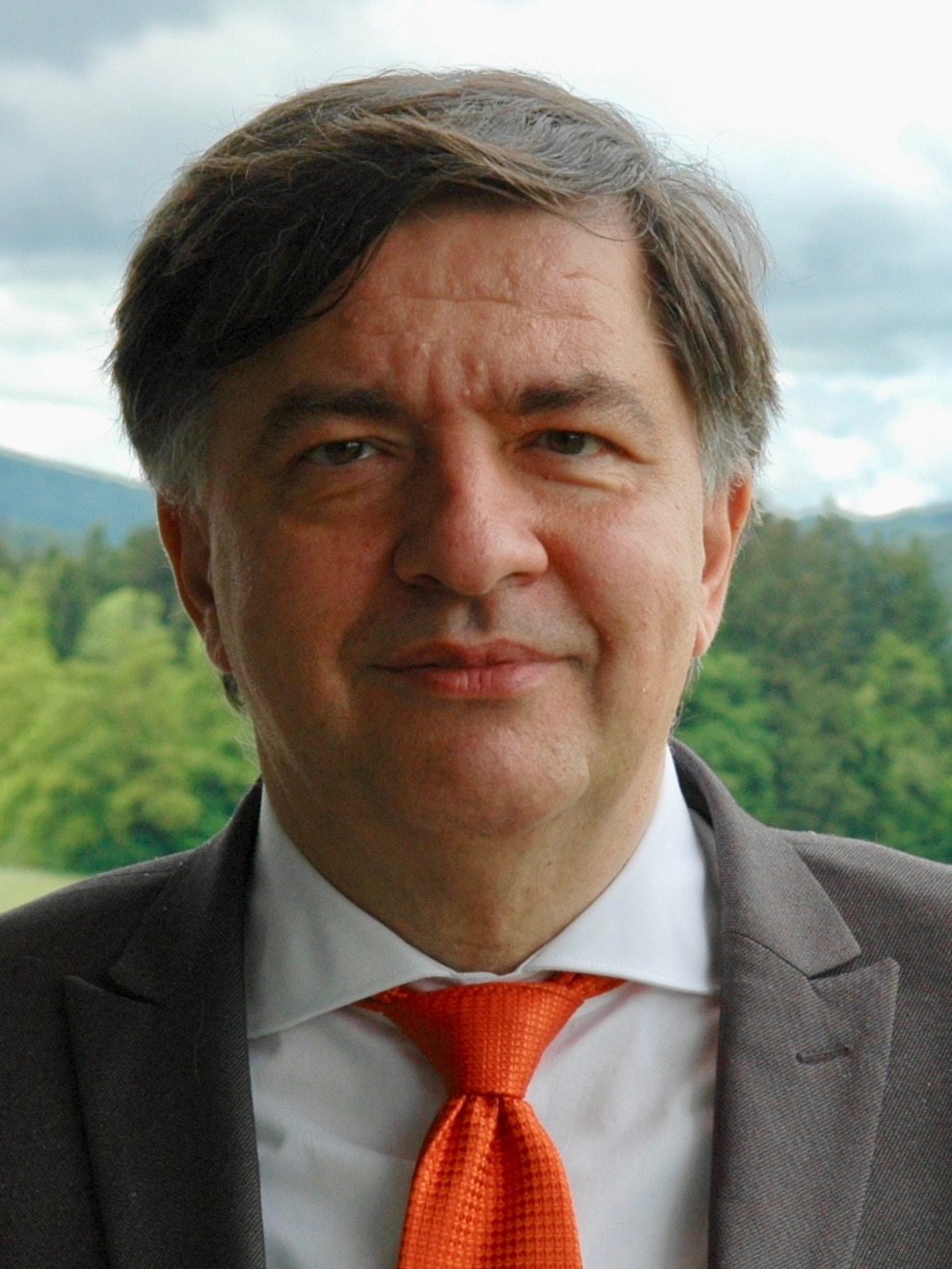
- Born: 21 July 1960 (age 66); Postojna, SR Slovenia, SFR Yugoslavia (present-day Postojna, Slovenia)
- Education: Cleveland State University
- Political party: DeSUS (2024–2025); SG (since 2025)
- Scientific career
- Fields: Management
- Workplaces: University of Ljubljana

Vlado Dimovski (born 21 July 1960, Postojna, Slovenia) is a Slovenian economist, philosopher, politician, consultant and university professor.

== Biography ==
After finishing the Bežigrad Grammar School Dimovski graduated in 1984 at the School of Economics and Business at the University of Ljubljana, where he received also an M.S. in economics in 1988. At the Faculty of Arts, University of Ljubljana he graduated in 1989 also in philosophy. He received his PhD degree in management and finance from the Cleveland State University, Ohio, United States in 1994.

Since 1985 Dimovski has been teaching at the School of Economics and Business, Ljubljana, from 2005 onwards as a full professor. As a visiting professor, Dimovski has been teaching at many different universities all over the world. Dimovski directed many research projects, financed by research foundations and corporations.

Dimovski counseled many different administrative and corporative bodies. Dimovski was two times Minister of Labour, Family and Social Affairs in the Government of Slovenia: in the government of prime minister Janez Drnovšek (2000–2002), and in the government of prime minister Tone Rop (2002–2004).

Since 2018 Dimovski is a personal counselor of the prime minister of the Republic of North Macedonia. Since 2019 he is the vice president of the Adriatic Council.

In 2016 Dimovski became a regular member of the European Academy of Sciences and Arts in Salzburg.

On 15 June 2024, he was elected as the new party president of DeSUS at the party congress, with 86 votes, while his opponent Vincenc Gajser received 9 votes. At the time of his election, Dimovski said that the party's main goal was to return to Parliament. The party then merged into the Party of Generations.

== Awards ==
Dimovski won the Beta Gamma Sigma Award in 1992 and the Harvard Directory of Scholars in 1993. In 2001, he won the Slovenian National Swimming Association Award and the Distinguished Slovenian Gold Management.

== Selected bibliography ==
- Škerlavaj, M., Štemberger, M. I., & Dimovski, V. (2007). Organizational learning culture—the missing link between business process change and organizational performance. International journal of production economics, 106(2), 346–367. academia.edu
- Pahor, M., Škerlavaj, M., & Dimovski, V. (2008). Evidence for the network perspective on organizational learning. Journal of the American Society for Information Science and Technology, 59(12), 1985–1994. www.researchgate.net
- Zagoršek, H., Dimovski, V., & Škerlavaj, M. (2009). Transactional and transformational leadership impacts on organizational learning. Journal for East European Management Studies, 144–165. www.econstor.eu
- Cadez, S., Dimovski, V., & Zaman Groff, M. (2017). Research, teaching and performance evaluation in academia: the salience of quality. Studies in Higher Education, 42(8), 1455–1473. srhe.tandfonline.com

== See also ==
- List of Slovenian politicians
- List of Cleveland State University people
- List of University of Ljubljana people
