= Harlan M. Sands =

American academic administrator

Harlan Sands

7th President of Cleveland State University
- In office June 1, 2018 – April 25th, 2022
- Preceded by: Ronald M. Berkman
- Succeeded by: Laura J. Bloomberg

Personal details
- Born: Wantagh, New York, U.S.
- Children: 2
- Education: University of Pennsylvania (BS); George Washington University (MBA); George Mason University (JD)

Military service
- Branch/service: United States Navy

Harlan M. Sands is an American academic administrator and attorney who served as the 7th President of Cleveland State University from June 2018 to April 2022.

== Early life and education ==
Sands is a native of Wantagh, New York. He earned a Bachelor of Science in economics from the Wharton School of the University of Pennsylvania, Master of Business Administration with a focus in finance from George Washington University, and Juris Doctor from the Antonin Scalia Law School at George Mason University. Sands served as an active duty member of the United States Navy for eight years, including as an intelligence officer and surface warfare officer on the USS Guam.

== Career ==
Sands began his career as an assistant public defender in Miami. Sands later joined the administration of Florida International University, where he served as Executive Director of the FIU Applied Research Center, Associate Vice President for Research, and Associate Dean of the College of Health and Urban Affairs. He also worked as a professor of criminal justice. Sands served for seven years at the University of Alabama at Birmingham, working as the Vice Provost for Administration and Quality Improvement. At the University of Louisville, Sands served as Senior Vice President of Finance and Administration, CFO, and COO. Sands then returned to his undergraduate alma mater, The Wharton School, where he served as Vice Dean of Finance and Administration, Chief Financial Officer and Chief Administrative Officer.

Sands was selected by the Cleveland State University board of trustees to serve as the institution's seventh president, and took office on June 1, 2018, succeeding Ronald M. Berkman. In 2019, Sands was named on the Cleveland Magazine Most Interesting People list. He resigned the post in April 2022, reportedly the result of a mutual decision, amidst disagreements regarding the future of the college. He was paid $928,000 to step-down.

== Personal life ==
Sands and his wife, Lynn, have two sons.
