= Kenneth A. Loparo =

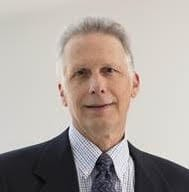
- Scientific career
- Fields: Control systems engineering; Stochastic systems; Power systems
- Workplaces: Case Western Reserve University

Kenneth A. Loparo is an American engineer and academic specializing in control systems engineering, stochastic systems, power systems, and biomedical signal processing. He is Arthur L. Parker Endowed Professor Emeritus at Case Western Reserve University and has held secondary appointments in the Departments of Biomedical Engineering and Mechanical and Aerospace Engineering within the Case School of Engineering.

== Education ==
Loparo earned bachelor's and master's degrees in mechanical engineering from the Fenn College of Engineering at Cleveland State University and received a PhD in systems and control engineering from Case Western Reserve University.

== Early Career ==
Loparo served as an assistant professor in the Department of Mechanical Engineering at Cleveland State University from 1977 to 1979 before joining the faculty of Case Western Reserve University in 1979.

== Research ==
Loparo's research has focused on nonlinear and stochastic systems, electrical power systems, fault detection and diagnosis, adaptive control, distributed autonomous systems, signal processing, and physiological monitoring systems. Applications of this work have included electric power generation and transmission, health monitoring, and biomedical data analysis.

His work has examined stability and control of nonlinear and stochastic systems in large-scale electrical infrastructure, nonlinear filtering methods for monitoring and diagnosis, information-theoretic approaches to adaptive and distributed systems, and signal processing methods for analysis of physiological data.

=== Power System and Condition Monitoring ===
Loparo conducted research related to electric power systems and condition monitoring. Among these projects was a study examining the integration of offshore wind energy in Lake Erie into regional transmission infrastructure.

=== Biomedical Signal Processing and Critical Care ===
Loparo work on neonatal neurology examined relationships between EEG characteristics and neurodevelopment, including studies of sleep-state analysis in infants and physiological responses associated with neonatal care practices.

In sleep medicine, he contributed to research using signal analysis methods to study sleep dynamics and sleep-stage transitions.

His research also examined physiological markers associated with neonatal outcomes and neurocritical care. Collaborative work included development of data infrastructure and analytical approaches for intensive care monitoring and studies evaluating heart rate variability as a clinical biomarker.

=== Interdisciplinary Collaborations on Parkinson's Disease ===
Loparo collaborated on studies examining dynamic cycling interventions for individuals with Parkinson's disease. This work contributed to research into motor rehabilitation approaches and the development of cycling-based rehabilitation systems.

== IEEE Service ==
Loparo was named a Fellow of the Institute of Electrical and Electronics Engineers (IEEE) in 1999. Within IEEE, he held editorial and leadership positions including service on the Board of Governors of the IEEE Control Systems Society, conference committees, and editorial roles for IEEE publications.

== AIMBE Fellowship ==
In 2015, Loparo was elected to the College of Fellows of the American Institute for Medical and Biological Engineering (AIMBE) for contributions in biomedical engineering and signal processing.

== Awards and Honors ==
He has received numerous awards including the Sigma Xi Research Award for contributions to stochastic control, the John S. Diekoff Award for Distinguished Graduate Teaching, the Tau Beta Pi Outstanding Engineering and Science Professor Award, the Undergraduate Teaching Excellence Award, the Carl F. Wittke Award for Distinguished Undergraduate Teaching and the Srinivasa P. Gutti Memorial Engineering Teaching Award.

== Selected Publication ==
Loparo has authored or co-authored numerous peer-reviewed publications spanning stochastic systems theory, power systems engineering, biomedical signal processing, and physiological monitoring. A selection of notable works includes:

- Feng, X.; Loparo, K.A.; Ji, Y.; Chizeck, H.J. (1992). "Stochastic stability properties of jump linear systems". IEEE Transactions on Automatic Control. 37 (1): 38–53. Bibcode:1992ITAC...37...38F. doi:10.1109/9.109637.
- Loparo, K.A.; Adams, M.L.; Lin, W.; Abdel-Magied, M.F.; Afshari, N. (2000). "Fault detection and diagnosis of rotating machinery". IEEE Transactions on Industrial Electronics. 47 (5): 1005–1014. Bibcode:2000ITIE...47.1005L. doi:10.1109/41.873208.
- Lou, Xinsheng; Loparo, Kenneth A. (2004). "Bearing fault diagnosis based on wavelet transform and fuzzy inference". Mechanical Systems and Signal Processing. 18 (5): 1077–1095. Bibcode:2004MSSP...18.1077L. doi:10.1016/S0888-3270(03)00077-3.
- "Entropy-based Measures of EEG Arousals as Biomarkers for Sleep Dynamics: Applications to Hypertension". Sleep. 2008. doi:10.5665/sleep/31.7.935. PMC 2491508.
- Janjarasjitt, S.; Scher, M.S.; Loparo, K.A. (2008). "Nonlinear dynamical analysis of the neonatal EEG time series: The relationship between neurodevelopment and complexity". Clinical Neurophysiology. 119 (4): 822–836. doi:10.1016/j.clinph.2007.11.012. PMID 18203659.
- Raffay, Thomas M.; Dylag, Andrew M.; Sattar, Abdus; Abu Jawdeh, Elie G.; Cao, Shufen; Pax, Benjamin M.; Loparo, Kenneth A.; Martin, Richard J.; Di Fiore, Juliann M. (2019). "Neonatal intermittent hypoxemia events are associated with diagnosis of bronchopulmonary dysplasia at 36 weeks postmenstrual age". Pediatric Research. 85 (3): 318–323. doi:10.1038/s41390-018-0253-z. PMC 6377834. PMID 30538265.
- Megjhani, Murad; Kaffashi, Farhad; Terilli, Kalijah; Alkhachroum, Ayham; Esmaeili, Behnaz; Doyle, Kevin William; Murthy, Santosh; Velazquez, Angela G.; Connolly, E. Sander; Roh, David Jinou; Agarwal, Sachin; Loparo, Ken A.; Claassen, Jan; Boehme, Amelia; Park, Soojin (2020). "Heart Rate Variability as a Biomarker of Neurocardiogenic Injury After Subarachnoid Hemorrhage". Neurocritical Care. 32 (1): 162–171. doi:10.1007/s12028-019-00734-3. PMC 6856427. PMID 31093884.
- Scher, Mark S.; Eyre, Harris; Donn, Steven; Roberts, James M.; Msall, Michael E.; Salafia, Carolyn M.; Towbin, Richard; Robinson, Peter; Loparo, Ken; Berk, Michael; Moro, Elena; Smith, Valerie; Ludington, Susan; Badawi, Nadia; Hunt, Rod W.; Gunn, Alistair; Sarnat, Harvey B.; Kunikullaya, Kirthana; Pilon, Betsy (2026). "An interdisciplinary fetal neonatal neurology collaborative promotes integrative life-course brain health". Frontiers in Neurology. 16 1725289. doi:10.3389/fneur.2025.1725289. PMC 12819184. PMID 41573402.
