= Claire Van Ummersen =

American academic (1935–2021)

- Education: Tufts University
- Title: 2010–2021: Senior Advisor to American Council on Education's Division of Leadership Programs for the Alfred P. Sloan Foundation initiative on faculty career flexibility 2005–2010: Vice President for the Effective Leadership Program at the American Council on Education 2001–2005: Vice President and Director of the Office of Women in Higher Education at the American Council on Education 1986–1992: Chancellor of the University System of New Hampshire 1981–1986: Served with the Massachusetts Board of Regents of Higher Education

Claire Van Ummersen (July 28, 1935 – September 29, 2021) was an American scholar and academic administrator, who served as President of Cleveland State University from 1993 to 2001. She was also national leader in career flexibility in higher education and women's advancement and leadership.

Van Ummersen died in a car accident in Needham, Massachusetts, on September 29, 2021, at the age of 86.

== Early life and career ==
Van Ummersen was born in July 1935 in Chelsea, Massachusetts. An interest in science led her to Medford High School in Medford, MA, where she was enrolled in advanced classes in chemistry, physics, and biology. She enjoyed learning foreign languages, especially French and Latin. The latter helped her to excel in biology. In 1953, she was awarded the Mary Edward Peters scholarship to attend Tufts University, where she graduated summa cum laude in 1957 with a baccalaureate degree in biology. During her freshman year at Tufts, she had to change her academic adviser because he didn't allow her to enroll in as many science classes as she would want to at any given time. Later, she received her master's (1960) and doctorate (1963) in biology from Tufts, with a dissertation titled “An experimental study of developing abnormalities induced in the chick embryo by exposure to radio frequency waves.”

=== Memberships ===
- American Association for the Advancement of Science
- Society for Developmental Biology

== Academic Career and Research ==
Dr. Van Ummersen's academic and research career began when she was selected, while in a Ph.D. program, as a member of Tufts' Investigation Group tasked with investigating the effects of microwave radiations on human health. Her team is credited with establishing present-day safety standards for microwave exposure. From 1963 to 1966, she served as a post-doctoral teaching associate. In 1967, she became a lecturer at the department of biology at Tufts, only to soon join the faculty of the University of Massachusetts at Boston in 1968, where she began 14 years of leadership and teaching positions including as assistant and associate professor of biology, director of the graduate program in biology, associate vice chancellor of academic affairs, and interim chancellor from 1978 to 1979. She was also tasked with chairing the pre-med, pre-vet, and pre-dentistry committees and the faculty senate committee on strategic planning. Her legacy at the University of Massachusetts is best remembered for her major responsibility in developing the first campus-wide Ph.D. program in environmental sciences with an emphasis on marine ecology, coastal zone management and marine toxicology.

=== Research and Scholarly Activities ===
- 1957–1967: Research Associate in microwave radiobiology, Tufts University
- 1968–1978: Reviewer, Health and Human Services, Bureau of Radiological Health
- 1975–1978: Research in reproductive systems: establishment of reproductive patterns in snails; establishment of first appearance of reproductive hormones in fetal rats
- 1975–1979: Reviewer, Division of Physiology, Cellular and Molecular Biology, National Science Foundation

== Administrative career ==
From 1981 to 1986, she served on the Massachusetts Board of Regents of Higher Education in several leadership positions including vice chancellor of management systems and telecommunications and associate vice chancellor for academic affairs. Statewide planning and program review were critical components of her responsibilities.

From 1986 to 1992, she served as the chancellor of the University System of New Hampshire during which she launched the Instructional Video Network to link all of the system campuses as well as selected local schools. In 1994, former U.S. Representative Louis Stokes said on the floor of the House, "under Dr. Van Ummersen's leadership, higher education has witnessed a major reconstruction. Her energies have led to innovative techniques being used to foster education and expanded services being offered. From 1986 to 1992, while serving as chancellor of USNH, she managed over 29,000 students and a $300 million operating budget. In addition, Dr. Van Ummersen was responsible for launching an innovative instructional television network. Her unyielding efforts resulted in the linkage of all of the state's universities and colleges by televised instruction. She was also responsible for spearheading the implementation of a doctoral program in environmental sciences."

In 1993, she was appointed president of Cleveland State University, a post she maintained until 2001. During her tenure at Cleveland State, she developed major partnerships with the Cleveland Clinic, University Hospitals and Case Western Reserve University, which led to Biomedical Research Cleveland, a research collaborative on structural biology. In collaboration with Kent State, University of Akron, Northeastern Ohio University College of Medicine and Youngstown State University joint masters programs were developed in social world (MSW) and public health (MPH), delivered via a new interactive video network that also served 17 regional high schools providing advanced placement courses for high school students and graduate course work for teachers. Additionally, as stated by former U.S. Representative Dennis Kucinich, "[u]nder her leadership, Cleveland State University executed an extensive building construction program and implemented several resourceful degree programs. The university's endowment grew fourfold during her tenure. Recently, [in 2001] the North Central Association of Colleges and Schools Commission on Institutions of Higher Education suggested that Cleveland State University be honored continuing accreditation without qualification for the next ten years."

== American Council on Education, Consulting, and National Service ==
In 2001, Dr. Van Ummersen joined the American Council on Education as vice president and director of the Office of Women in Higher Education until 2005, before serving as its vice president for the Effective Leadership Program from 2005 to 2010. She set national agendas to support the advancement of women leaders and state networks, which operate to identify emerging leaders.

She latterly served as a senior adviser for the Institutional Leadership Group, Division of Lifelong Learning, where she was tasked with guiding and leading several initiatives aimed at enhancing faculty's work-life flexibility and retirement transition practices in academia.

Dr. Van Ummersen also served on numerous boards and commissions in several states and has consulted with universities in the United States, the Middle East, Russia, China, and Taiwan. She was a member of Phi Beta Kappa and Sigma Xi honorary societies.

=== National Service ===
- Board of Directors, American Association of State Colleges and Universities
- Executive Committee for the National Institute for the Environment Board of Directors, National Collegiate Athletic Association Division 1 Board
- Commission on the Urban Agenda, National Association of State Colleges and Land Grant Universities
- Association Liaison Office Advisory Committee, National Association of State Colleges and Land Grant Universities
- Emerging Issues Task Force, American Association of State Colleges and Universities
- Task Force on Engagement, American Association of State Colleges and Universities
- Women's Commission, American Council on Education

== Legacy ==
Dr. Claire Van Ummersen Presidential Leadership Award is sponsored by the NCAA-NACWAA. It was established to recognize university administrators who have “demonstrated leadership and promotion of women's opportunities in athletics administration or coaching.”

She also held several honorary degrees, including: doctor of science from the University of Massachusetts in 1988, doctor of science from the University of Maine in 1991, doctor of humane letters degree from New England University in 2005, doctor of humane letters from Granite State College in 2009.

Past CVU Presidential Leadership Award Nominees

2013: Dr. Anne Ponder of the University of North Carolina, Asheville.

2014: Dr. Mary Evans Sias, Kentucky State University.

=== Honors, Awards and Grants ===
- American Cancer Society Grant, Principal Investigator for Development Studies on Chick Embryo
- Athena Award
- Distinguished Service Medal, University of Massachusetts
- Distinguished Service Award, the Urban League of Greater Cleveland
- Distinguished Service Award, Crain's Cleveland Business
- Elected to Phi Beta Kappa
- Elected to Sigma Xi
- Elected to Phi Alpha National Social Work Honor Society
- Education's Woman of the year, YWCA of Cleveland
- Elected to New York Academy of Science
- General Electric National Scholarship
- Good Citizenship Award, National Society of the Sons of the American Revolution
- Leadership Award, United Way Service
- May Edward Peters Scholarship, Tufts University
- National Institute of Health Grant
- Olmstead Teaching Fellow
- Graduate Alumni Awards: Outstanding Career Achievement Award
- USAF Air Research and Development Command Grant
- USAF School of Aviation of Medicine Grant
- Who's Who in Science; American Men and Women in Science
- Who's Who in America
- Who's Who in American Women
- Who's Who Worldwide

== Publications ==
- Faculty Retirement: Best Practices for Navigating the Transition
- Revitalized: Faculty Retirement Transitions
- Women in Academic Leadership: Professional Strategies, Personal Choices
- No Talent Left Behind: Attracting and Retaining a Diverse Faculty
- The Widening Gyre: Lessons from the Fourth Women President's Summit: Living in the Present, Shaping the Future
- Breaking the Barriers: A Guidebook of Strategies: Advancing Women's Leadership III
- Breaking the Barriers: Presidential Strategies for Enhancing Career Mobility (Advancing Women's Leadership II)
- From Where We Sit: Women’s Perspectives on the Presidency: Advancing Women's Leadership I
- Comparison of Absorption by Normal and Phantom Eyes Exposed to Cataractogenic Doses of Microwaves Radiation
- The Action of Microwave Radiation on the Eye
- Experimental Microwave Cataracts: Age as a Factor in Induction of Cataracts in the Rabbit
- Effects of Microwave on the Chick Embryo
- Biological Effects of Microwave Radiation with Particular Reference to the Eyes
- Experimental Radiation Cataracts Induced by Microwave Radiation
