= Richard J. Helldobler =

Eighth President of William Paterson University

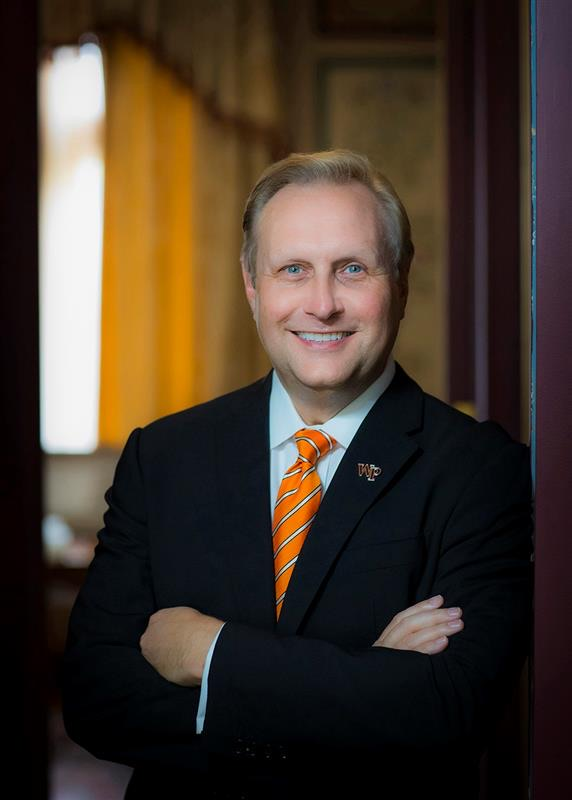

Richard J. Helldobler is an American educator and academic administrator who currently serves as the eighth president of William Paterson University in Wayne, New Jersey. He assumed office on July 1, 2018, after serving as interim president of Northeastern Illinois University in Chicago. A trained dancer and theatre director, he was the founding artistic director of CalRep Pennsylvania and The Mon Valley Ballet Theatre at California University of Pennsylvania. As of 2023, he serves as Board Co-Chair of LGBTQ Presidents in Higher Education and is a past member and chair of the board of the American Association of State Colleges and Universities.

Helldobler earned his Ph.D. in theatre and M.A. in speech and theatre from Bowling Green State University, and a bachelor of business administration degree in marketing from the University of Toledo.
