= William Paterson University =

Public university in Wayne, New Jersey, U.S.

- Former name: List: Paterson City Normal School (1855–1923); New Jersey State Normal School at Paterson (1923–1937); New Jersey State Teacher’s College at Paterson (1937–1951); Paterson State Teachers College (1951–1958); Paterson State College (1958–1971); William Paterson College of New Jersey (1971–1997)
- Type: Public university
- Established: 1855; 171 years ago
- Academic affiliations: Space-grant
- President: Richard J. Helldobler
- Administrative staff: 1,147
- Students: 8,398 (2021)
- Undergraduates: 5,298 (2021)
- Postgraduates: 3,100 (2021)
- Location: Wayne, New Jersey, U.S. 40.947°N 74.198°W
- Campus: 370 acres (150 ha)
- Colors: Orange & black
- Nickname: Pioneers
- Sporting affiliations: NCAA Division III-NJAC
- Mascot: Pio (since 2021)
- Website: wpunj.edu
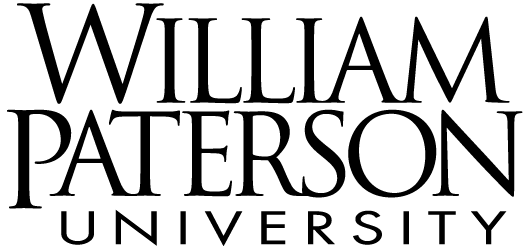

William Paterson University, known as WP, officially William Paterson University of New Jersey (WPUNJ), is a public university in Wayne, New Jersey, United States. It is part of New Jersey's public system of higher education.

Founded in 1855 and named after American statesman, lawyer, jurist, and signer of the United States Constitution William Paterson, William Paterson is the third-oldest public institution in New Jersey. William Paterson offers undergraduate, graduate, and doctoral degrees through its five academic colleges. During the fall 2023 semester, 6,546 undergraduate students and 2,880 graduate students were enrolled.

== History ==
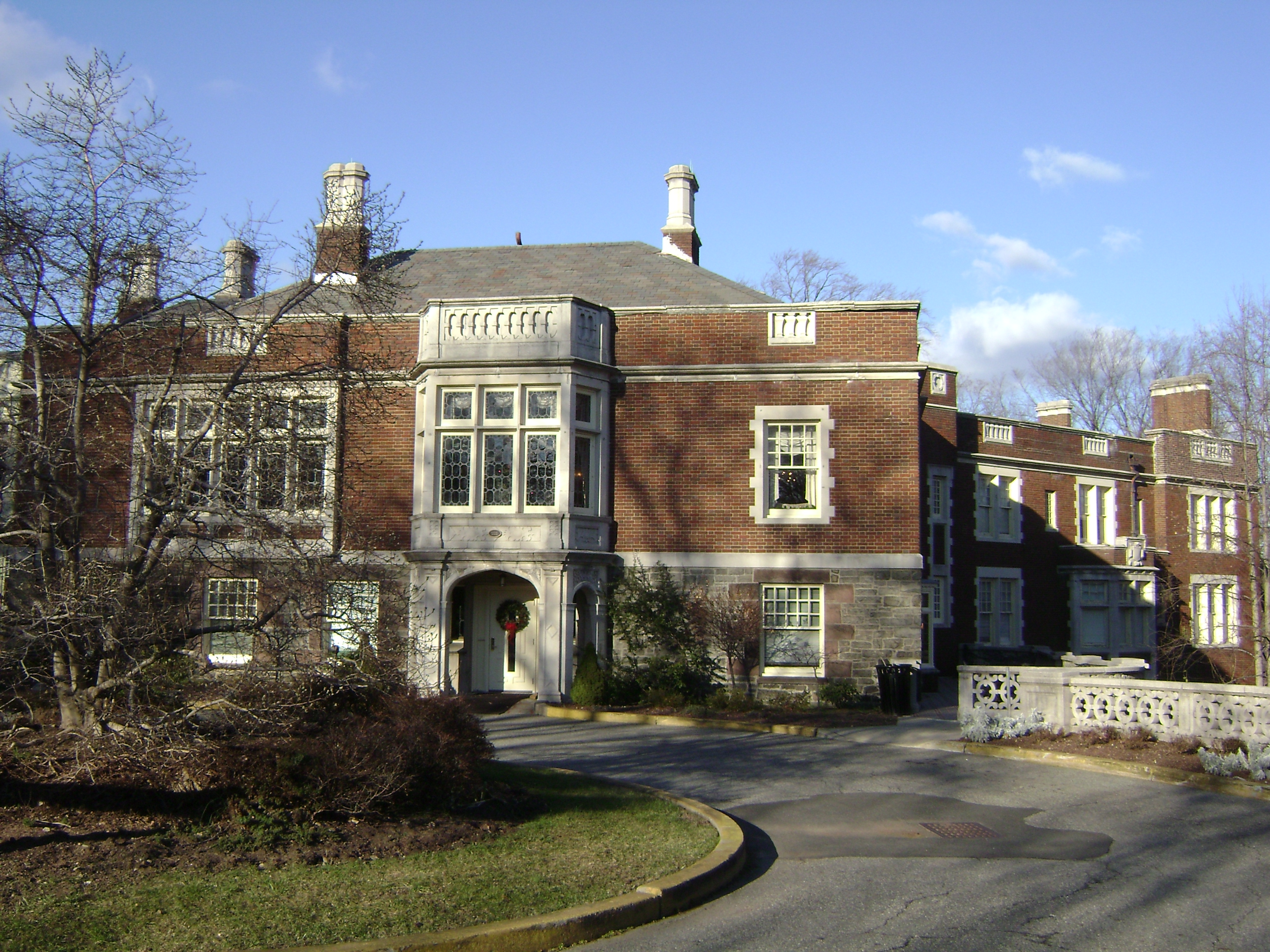
Hobart Manor

William Paterson University was founded in 1855 as the Paterson City Normal School. For more than a century, training teachers for New Jersey schools was its exclusive mission. In 1951, the university moved to the present campus to a site originally known as Ailsa Farms, that was purchased by the State of New Jersey in 1948 from the family of Garret Hobart, twenty-fourth vice president of the United States.

The original manor house was built in 1877 in the style of a castle, and was the home of John McCullough, a Scottish immigrant who made a fortune in the wool industry. It was later purchased, enlarged and made the weekend retreat and summer residence of the Hobart family. Today, the building is known as Hobart Manor and is home of the Office of the President and the Office of Institutional Advancement. Hobart Manor was designated a national and state landmark in 1976.

The university changed its name to Paterson State Teachers College when it relocated from Paterson in 1951. In 1966, the curriculum was expanded to include degree offerings other than those leading to a teaching career. In 1971, it was renamed William Paterson College of New Jersey. The change of name honored William Paterson, who was the state's first senator, its second governor, and a United States Supreme Court Justice appointed by President George Washington, and reflected both the institution's beginnings in the city that also bears his name and the legislative mandate to move from a teachers' college to a broad-based liberal arts institution.

The Commission on Higher Education granted William Paterson university status in June 1997.

Dr. Richard J. Helldobler, former interim president of Northeastern Illinois University in Chicago, Illinois, became the eighth president of William Paterson University. He took office July 1, 2018 to replace the retiring Kathleen Waldron, who had served as the school's president since August 2010 after the retirement of Arnold Speert.

In November 2021, hundreds of workers and students protested planned layoffs at the school following a $30 million budget shortfall.

== Academics ==
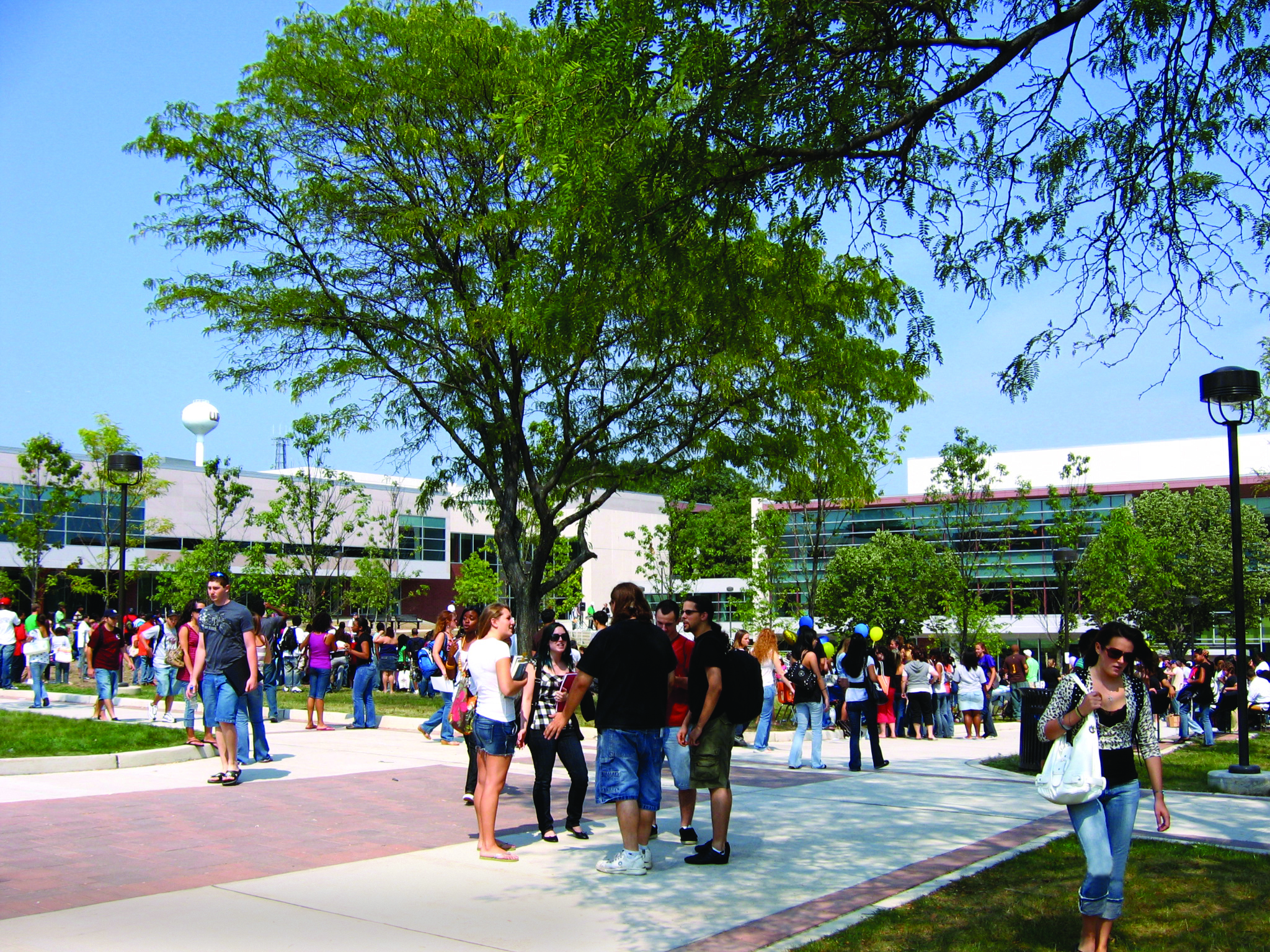
University Commons

The university is accredited by the Middle States Commission on Higher Education, Association to Advance Collegiate Schools of Business, Commission on Collegiate Nursing Education, National Association of Schools of Art and Design, National Association of Schools of Music, and the Council for the Accreditation of Educator Preparation, among others.

It is organized into four academic colleges: College of Arts, Humanities, and Social Sciences, Cotsakos College of Business, College of Education, and College of Science and Health, offering undergraduate, graduate, and doctoral degrees. U.S. News & World Report in its 2024 edition of Best Colleges ranks the university as number 69 of Regional Universities North. It also ranks no. 23 in Top Public Schools-Regional Universities North and #58 in Best Value Schools-Regional Universities North.

- The College of Arts, Humanities, and Social Sciences Communication, the university's largest college, grants the Bachelor of Arts, Bachelor of Fine Arts, Bachelor of Music, Master of Fine Arts, Master of Arts, Master of Music, and Doctor of Psychology (PsyD) degrees.
- The Cotsakos College of Business, named in honor of Dr. Christos Cotsakos ‘73, an entrepreneur, former chairman of the board and CEO for E*TRADE, and generous benefactor to the university, grants the Bachelor of Science, Bachelor of Arts, and Master of Business Administration degrees.
- The College of Education grants the Bachelor of Arts, Bachelor of Music, Bachelor of Science, Master of Arts in Teaching, and Master of Education. Students may also pursue certificates.
- The College of Science and Health grants the Bachelor of Science, Bachelor of Arts, Master of Science, and Master of Public Health degrees. It also includes the School of Nursing, established in fall 2023, which grants the Bachelor of Science in nursing, Master of Science in nursing, and Doctor of Nursing Practice. It also offers several pre-professional programs, as well as post-baccalaureate programs.
- The Honors College offers tracks in several disciplines as well as independent study.

== Campus ==
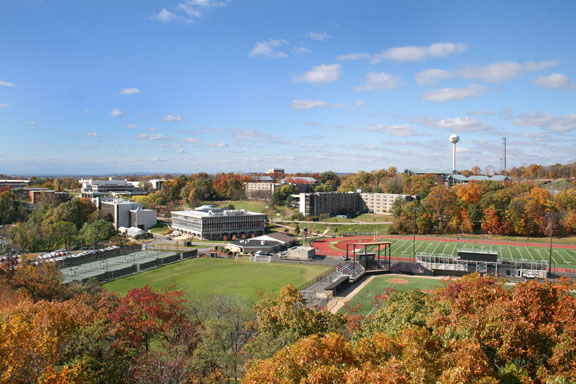
Aerial view of the campus; this picture was taken from the east end of the campus, with WPU's Wightman Field football stadium visible near the foreground.

William Paterson University is on a 370-acre (150 ha) hilly, wooded campus in northern New Jersey in the suburban township of Wayne. The campus is located on County Route 504, along the eastern town line of Wayne, and small parts of the campus are in the boroughs of Haledon and North Haledon, It borders on High Mountain Preserve, a forested area, nearly 1,200 acres (4.9 km^{2}) of wetlands and woodlands, and is 3 miles (4.8 km) west of the historic Great Falls in Paterson. New York City is 20 miles (32 km) to the east, the Jersey Shore is an hour's drive south, skiing is 30 miles (48 km) north, and the Meadowlands Sports Complex is a half-hour drive away.

=== Facilities ===
William Paterson University's buildings include:

- University Hall, an 80,000 square-foot academic building which opened in January 2016 and was funded in part by the Building Our Future Bond Act, is a mix of general-use classrooms, dedicated laboratories, and clinical spaces for programs in nursing, communication disorders, and public health.
- The David and Lorraine Cheng Library is the academic knowledge center of William Paterson University.
- The expanded and renovated 232,000-square-foot Science Complex features nearly 100 research labs and 50 teaching labs.
- The 1600 Valley Road Building, which includes interactive classrooms, the Russ Berrie Institute for Professional Sales with its professional sales laboratory, and the Financial Learning Center (a simulated trading floor).
- The University Galleries at the Ben Shahn Center for the Visual Arts presents exhibitions of contemporary art, oversees the university's art collections and offers educational programs.
- The Power Art Center accommodates an array of studio arts, including three-dimensional design, photography, sculpture, ceramics, printmaking, woodworking, and painting.
- The Nel Bolger, RN Nursing Laboratory is a patient simulation laboratory suite in University Hall. The lab features computerized patient simulation mannequins, a control station for operating the mannequins, robotic digital cameras to record students practicing patient care techniques, television screens to display the lab sessions, one-way mirrors to allow viewing by professors, and editing facilities for creative electronic DVDs for evaluations of student progress.
- Hamilton Hall, the communication building, houses TV broadcast studios, the WPSC radio station and sound engineering arts facilities. Hamilton Hall, originally Hobart Hall, had its name changed in summer of 2019. The reasoning behind the name change was due to the fact that students, particularly first-year freshmen, were confusing Hobart Manor and Hobart Hall for one another. The new name is in reference to Alexander Hamilton, one of the Founding Fathers of the United States and first United States Secretary of the Treasury.
- The University Commons, including the John Victor Machuga Student Center with its food court and the Speert Hall dining facility, is the hub of campus life, providing a venue for the entire University community to gather and interact.

== Student life ==
Undergraduate demographics as of Fall 2023
Race and ethnicity	Total
Hispanic	34%
White	32%
Black	20%
Asian	7%
International student	2%
Two or more races	2%
Unknown	2%
Economic diversity
Low-income (Note: The percentage of students who received an income-based federal Pell grant intended for low-income students.)	46%
Affluent (Note: The percentage of students who are a part of the American middle class at the bare minimum.)	54%

=== Residential life ===
The university provides housing for nearly 2,600 students in ten residence halls, including two that opened in 2006. Two residence halls, High Mountain East and West, offer learning communities in collaboration with the university's Honors College, and feature smart classrooms that are used as part of the living/learning experience.

With accommodations ranging from double room suites to apartments, the university's modern, smoke-free buildings range in size from 100 to 400 students and are coed by suite, with four residents sharing a suite or apartment. First-year students start out in traditional residence halls such as Overlook South and North, Hillside Hall, White Hall, Matelson Hall, and Century Hall, while upper-class students and older transfer students experience the added independence of the apartments, Pioneer Hall and Heritage Hall.

The newest residence hall, Skyline Hall, completed construction in 2019.

=== Organizations and campus activities ===
Offering an active campus experience for both resident and commuter students, William Paterson University hosts 24 fraternities and sororities and more than 70 clubs and organizations, as well as intramural and recreational activities, peer education, and leadership programs. William Paterson University's Club Sports include Cheerleading, Bowling, Equestrian, Ice Hockey, Rugby, Dance and Track.

WPSC 88.7 Brave New Radio, William Paterson's student-run radio station, is the headquarters for College Radio Day, an effort to celebrate the importance of college radio. In 2012, more than 500 college radio stations in 20 countries participated in the event.

In 2018, sorority student Jasmine Barkley, who had been elected to the Greek student senate, posted a video along with a white female student from Penn State University, in which she used the n-word in a song; she later posted a video saying that her video was not racist, but the school's administration issued a statement condemning her actions.

== Athletics ==
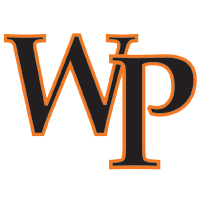
WPU athletics logo

The university has 13 intercollegiate sports teams in the NCAA Division III, six for men and seven for women, including NCAA teams in men's baseball and women's softball. The William Paterson University Pioneers compete in Division III of the National Collegiate Athletic Association (NCAA), as well as in the Eastern College Athletic Conference (ECAC) and the New Jersey Athletic Conference (NJAC). The Faculty Athletic Support Team (FAST) was established in 2013 by the Department of Intercollegiate Athletics, The Office of the Provost, and a number of faculty members, to create a formalized program to enhance communication and serve a resource to assist student-athletes with retention, success and growth.

=== Division III sports ===
Women's sports

- Basketball
- Soccer
- Softball
- Field hockey
- Swimming & diving
- Tennis
- Volleyball

Men's sports

- Baseball (national champions, 1992 and 1996)
- Basketball
- Football
- Golf
- Soccer
- Swimming & diving

== Cultural events, lectures, conferences, and art ==
WP Presents! is the university portal to information about performing arts programs produced and presented by the College of The Arts and Communication. University Performing Arts and University Galleries administer programs in creative and performing arts including the Jazz Room Series, New Jersey Playwrights Contest, and all public productions in the Shea Center for Performing Arts and the Hunziker Black Box Theatre. Cultural events take place on campus throughout the year, including theater productions, gallery exhibits, and concerts presenting jazz, classical, and contemporary music.

- The university's Jazz Room Series, launched in 1978, hosts both William Paterson's student ensembles and visiting professional and renowned jazz musicians. The Jazz Room Series is the longest-running, campus-based jazz concert series in the nation, entering its thirty-sixth year in 2014. The Jazz Room has received over two decades of continuous grant support from the New Jersey State Council on the Arts/Department of State, as well as grants from the National Endowment for the Arts, and the Geraldine R. Dodge Foundation. The series has been featured on national and metropolitan-area media, including recorded broadcasts.
- William Paterson's Sculpture on Campus program represents one of the largest collections of public sculpture in New Jersey, and the only higher education institution in the state with a formal program dedicated to placing public sculpture. Twenty-two works are located throughout the campus.

== Community and civic engagement ==
- William Paterson University is the only college or university in New Jersey that requires all students to take a three-credit course in civic engagement as a requirement for graduation.
- William Paterson signed a partnership agreement with the Paterson Great Falls National Historical Park. The agreement is designed to generate greater use of the Park's historical, cultural and natural resources for educational purposes.

== Honors, awards and recognition ==
- University Hall, the new academic building, was awarded a silver citation in the 2016 American School & University Educational Interiors Showcase, a competition honoring excellence in education interiors.
- The 2014 Green Design Award for William Paterson's new 1,000 space parking garage for its energy-efficient LED lighting technology from the Passaic County Board of Chosen Freeholders at their annual green design conference held on June 18, 2014.
- William Paterson University was recognized in the 2016 list of Top University Sales Programs for its Russ Berrie Institute for Professional Sales in the Cotsakos College of Business. The list, released by the Sales Education Foundation of Dayton, Ohio, highlights William Paterson University as one of the best locations for hiring sales professionals.
- William Paterson's solar panel installation ranks among the 10 largest installations at higher education institutions in the United States. The panels provide 15 to 20 percent of the institution's energy needs. In 2012, William Paterson was a finalist for the Second Nature Climate Leadership Awards, which recognize innovation and excellence in climate leadership at signatory institutions of the American College and University Presidents Climate Committee. William Paterson was one of 20 colleges and universities nationwide, and the only institution from New Jersey, named as finalists.
- For the third time in six years, William Paterson University's student-run radio station, WPSC 88.7 FM Brave New Radio, was named Best Radio Station in the Nation (among institutions with more than 10,000 students) by the Intercollegiate Broadcasting System (IBS) in March 2017. Additionally, in IBS's first year offering awards in the medium of video, WP-TV, the campus television station, won for Best Sports Report. In 2018 WP-TV won Best Sports Program, Best Variety Program, Best use of Graphics along with Best use of Social Media, Instagram. WPSC also won for Best Sports Play-By-Play Baseball/Softball, Best use of Social Media/Other and Best College Radio Station in the Nation for the second year in a row. WPSC also won the 2018 National Marconi Award for Best Non-Commercial Radio Station in the Nation.
- William Paterson University has been honored as a military friendly school for the seventh year in a row by the 2017 Guide to Military Friendly Schools and is included in their online listing at MilitaryFriendlySchools.com. There are nearly 150 veterans and active service students on campus.
- William Paterson University's Cotsakos College of Business is included in the 2017 edition of Princeton Review's Best 295 Business Schools. This marks the seventh consecutive year the Cotsakos College of Business has been featured in the book, which is well known for college rankings based on how students rate their schools.
- William Paterson University's Financial Planning Program in the Cotsakos College of Business has been named one of the top schools for financial planners by Financial Planning Magazine for the sixth consecutive year.
- The College of Education received the Best Practice Award in Support of Global Diversity for 2011 from the American Association of Colleges for Teacher Education (AACTE). The award honors the integration of diversity awareness into educator preparation and was presented to representatives of the program at AACTE's 63rd Annual Meeting and Exhibits in San Diego.

== Notable alumni ==
- Richie Adubato, basketball coach
- Eric Alexander, jazz musician
- Carl Allen, jazz drummer
- Ronald M. Berkman, president of Cleveland State University
- Tom Brislin, keyboardist, vocalist, songwriter and producer
- Thom Brooks, political philosopher and legal scholar
- Kevin Burkhardt, sportscaster
- Alex Chilowicz, soccer referee and musician
- Joe Clark, author, speaker, and educator
- Rod Daniels, sportscaster
- Joseph Farah, author and journalist
- Tom Fitzgerald, journalist
- Jeremiah Fraites, musician
- Rob Fusari, music producer & songwriter
- Samantha Giancola, reality television star
- Dana Hall, musician and ethnomusicologist
- Horace Jenkins, basketball player
- Justin Kauflin, jazz pianist
- Brian Lynch, screenwriter
- Ferit Odman, jazz drummer
- Herbert Perez, Taekwondo athlete
- Joseph D. Pistone, FBI agent
- Tyshawn Sorey, composer and musician
- Ray Toro, musician
- Dick Vitale, sportscaster
- Clinton Wheeler, former NBA player.
- Ian Ziering, actor
- Will Wood, musician and comedian

== Census-designated place ==
William Paterson University of New Jersey CDP
- Census-designated place
- Location in Passaic County Location in New Jersey Location in the United States
- Coordinates: 40°56′52″N 74°11′56″W
- Country: United States
- State: New Jersey
- County: Passaic
- Elevation: 512 ft (156 m)

Population (2020)
  - Total: 1,417
- Time zone: UTC−05:00 (Eastern (EST))
  - Summer (DST): UTC−04:00 (Eastern (EDT))
- FIPS code: 34-81365
- GNIS feature ID: 2806223

William Paterson University of New Jersey is a census-designated place (CDP) covering the William Paterson University campus in Wayne.

It first appeared as a CDP in the 2020 United States census with a population of 1,417.

Historical population
Census	Pop.	Note	%±
2020	1,417		—
U.S. Decennial Census; 2020

=== 2020 census ===
William Paterson University of New Jersey CDP, New Jersey – Racial and ethnic composition Note: the US Census treats Hispanic/Latino as an ethnic category. This table excludes Latinos from the racial categories and assigns them to a separate category. Hispanics/Latinos may be of any race.
Race / ethnicity (NH = Non-Hispanic)	Pop 2020	% 2020
White alone (NH)	332	23.43%
Black or African American alone (NH)	703	49.61%
Native American or Alaska Native alone (NH)	0	0.00%
Asian alone (NH)	59	4.16%
Native Hawaiian or Pacific Islander alone (NH)	0	0.00%
Other race alone (NH)	1	0.07%
Mixed race or Multiracial (NH)	13	0.92%
Hispanic or Latino (any race)	309	21.81%
Total	1,417	100.00%
