= James J. Nance =

American businessman

James Nance
- Born: James John Nance; February 19, 1900; Ironton, Ohio
- Died: July 21, 1984 (aged 84)

James John Nance (19 February 1900 – 21 July 1984) was an American industrialist who became president of the Studebaker-Packard Corporation. Later, he was chief executive of the Central National Bank of Cleveland, chairman of the executive committee of Montgomery Ward and chairman of the board of trustees of the Cleveland State University and a major property investor.

== Early life ==
Nance was born in Ironton, Ohio, Lawrence County, Ohio, in 1900 to George W. Nance and Florence Nance. He was raised on their farm. Following military service during World War I, Nance graduated from Ohio Wesleyan University in 1923; he also attended the Ohio State University where he pursued post-graduate course work.

== Career ==
Nance began his career at the National Cash Register (NCR) in 1924, staying until 1927 when he joined General Motors' Frigidaire division. In 1940 he left Frigidaire when he was named vice president of Zenith Radio Corporation of Chicago. Nance was named CEO of General Electric's Hotpoint brand in 1945 and CEO of the Packard Motor Car Company in 1952.

While at Studebaker Packard, Nance moved to separate the Packard Clipper range of vehicles into a stand-alone brand, Clipper. He also expedited the development of Packard's first V8 engine and automatic transmission, Ultramatic.

Nance helped to orchestrate the 1954 Packard acquisition of the Studebaker Corporation, creating the Studebaker Packard Corporation in 1954. While the Studebaker merger appeared to be in the best interests of both automakers, Studebaker failed to provide Packard with a full disclosure of its tenuous cash position, jeopardizing both marques.

While Nance had held informal talks with George W. Mason of Nash Kelvinator about a potential merger that would bring all the U.S. independent automakers under one corporate entity, formal discussions were never established. Any hope of those discussions moving forward ended with Mr.Mason's sudden death in October 1954.

Nance left Studebaker Packard in 1956 when the company was on the verge of insolvency, but not until he found the organization a safe-harbor relationship with airplane manufacturer Curtiss-Wright.

Following his tenure at Studebaker Packard, Nance was named vice president of Ford's Mercury Edsel Lincoln Division, but resigned under pressure from top Ford executives in 1959 when Edsel's sales were poor.

He left the automobile business following his tenure with Ford and became president and CEO of Central National Bank of Cleveland, Ohio in 1960, being elevated to the position of chairman and CEO in 1962. According to Nance he left the automobile industry because while there he had learned that everything depended on money and who controlled it.

Following his retirement from Central National, Nance established his own consulting firm in Cleveland, Ohio.

== Community leadership roles ==
In 1964 Nance was named as the first chairman of the board of trustees of Cleveland State University, a position that he held until 1970. Cleveland State named its business college in his honor (renaming it in June 2011 to honor another board of trustees chair, Monte Ahuja) and its library holds Nance's personal papers.

In addition to his tenure on the board of CSU, Nance also served as a life trustee for Northwestern University, a trustee for Ohio Wesleyan University and a trustee for University Hospitals of Cleveland, an affiliate of Case Western Reserve University.

== Personal life ==
Nance married the former Laura Battelle in 1925; the couple had two children. Following Nance's retirement he maintained his principal residence in Hunting Valley, Ohio. Mrs. Nance died in Michigan on October 26, 1977, at the age of 78.
