= Monte Ahuja College of Business =

Business school of Cleveland State University

- Established: 1964
- Location: Cleveland, Ohio, U.S. 41.5022°N 81.6794°W
- Website: www.csuohio.edu/business

The Monte Ahuja College of Business is a business school located within Cleveland State University in Cleveland, Ohio. It is fully accredited by the AACSB, and currently offers the Bachelor of Business Administration (BBA) undergraduate degree. It also offers six graduate degree programs, one dual graduate degree program, and one doctoral degree program.

== Location ==
Monte Ahuja College of Business is located in downtown Cleveland. It is bounded on the East 18th Street by Euclid Avenue and Chester Avenue.

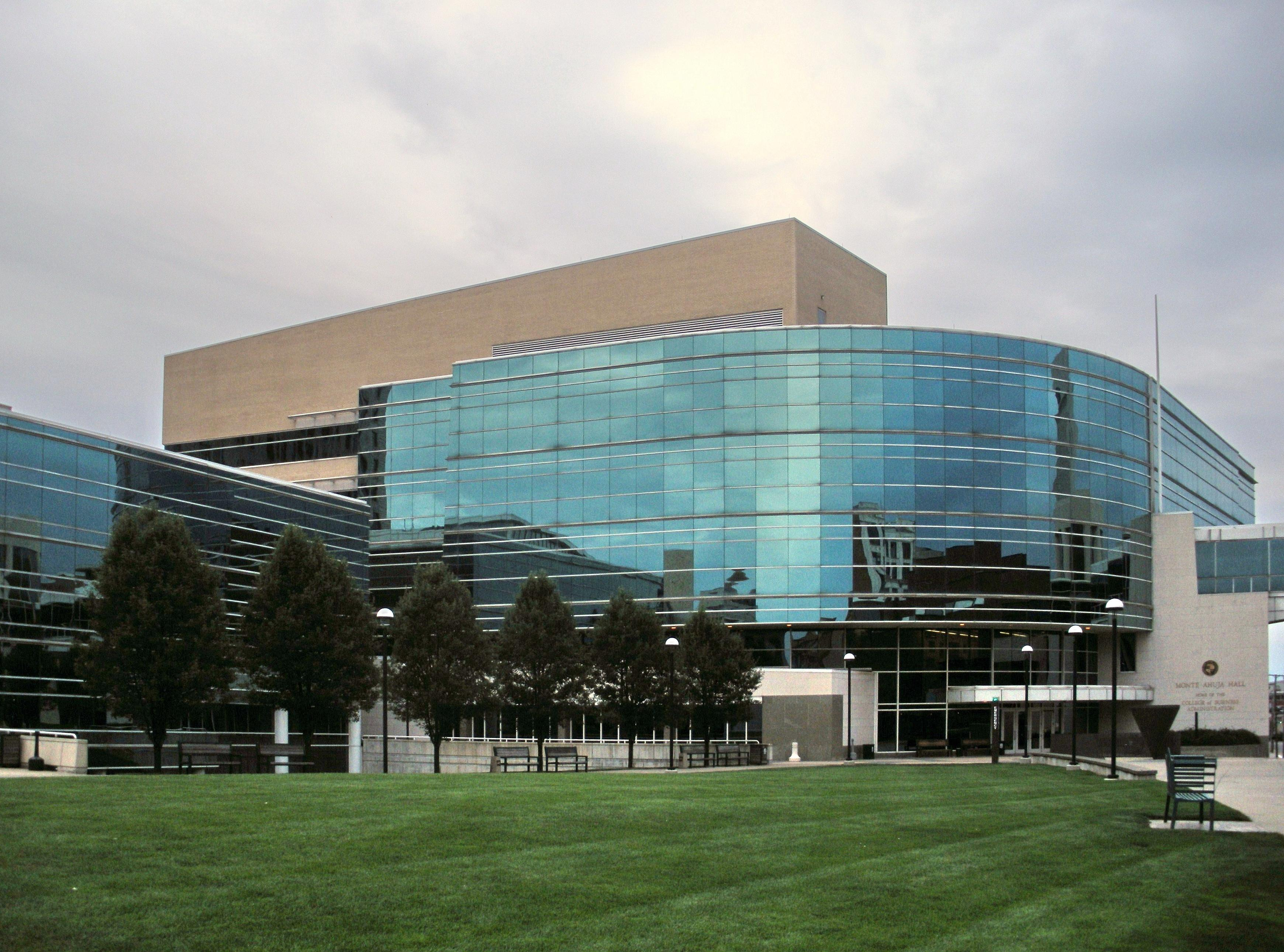
Monte Ahuja Hall, Monte Ahuja College of Business

== History ==
The Monte Ahuja College of Business was first formed as the Nance College of Business, named for James J. Nance, a Cleveland industrialist who served as the university's first chairman of the board of trustees. At the onset, it was an applied vocational school and was housed in World War II-era Quonset huts without any permanent building on campus.

In 1970, the college was renamed the James J. Nance College of Business Administration. In 2011, it was renamed Monte Ahuja College of Business, after former CSU Board of Trustees Chair, Monte Ahuja. Ahuja had donated $10 million to the school, which is the largest donation in the university's history.

== Programs and majors ==
=== Undergraduate majors ===
==== BBA ====
- Accounting
- Business Economics
- Finance
- Human Resources Management
- Information Systems
- International Business
- Management
- Marketing
- Operations And Supply Chain Management
- Property Management

==== Bachelor of Science ====
- Health Care Management
- Information Systems

==== Bachelor of Arts ====
- Economics
- Sport and Entertainment Management

=== Graduate programs ===
- Master of Accountancy (MACC)
- MBA, Master of Business Administration (Various Specializations Offered)
- EMBA, Executive Master of Business Administration
- Online Accelerated MBA (OAMBA)
- Master of Information Systems (MIS)
- Master of Health Care Management
- Master of Labor Relations/Human Resources (MLRHR)
- MBA/Juris Doctor (JD/MBA)
- Doctor of Business Administration (DBA)

=== Global Business Center ===
The Global Business Center was created to conduct education and training programs in global business.

== Honors ==
The college was honored on June 21, 2006, with the Ohio Governor's Excellence in Exporting Award, presented by then-Governor Bob Taft.
