= WPSC-FM =

Radio station at William Paterson University in Wayne, New Jersey

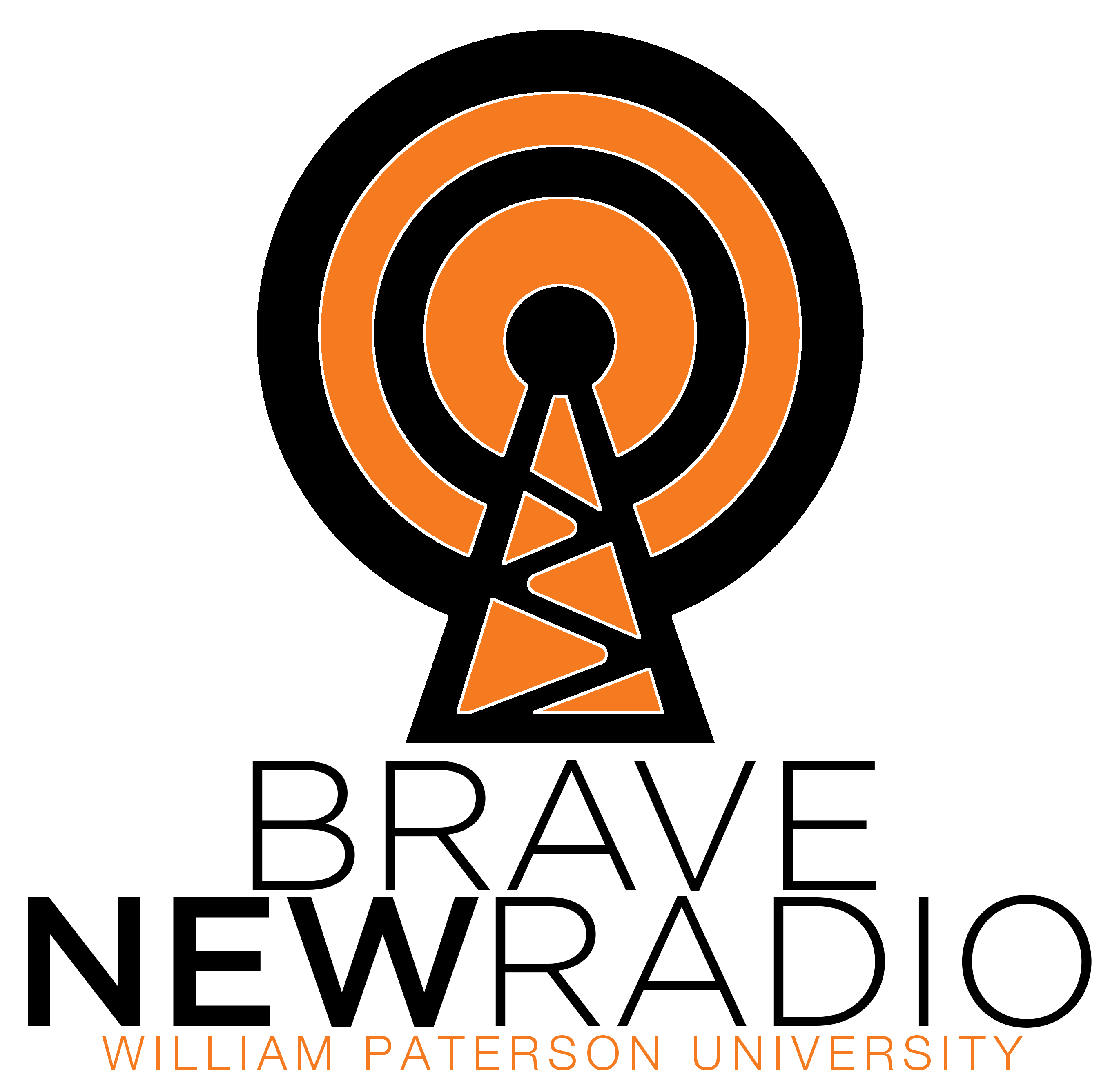
- Wayne, New Jersey; United States
- Broadcast area: North Jersey; New York City
- Frequency: 88.7 MHz
- Branding: Brave New Radio

Programming
- Format: classic rock

Ownership
- Owner: William Paterson University
- Sister stations: WVQR

History
- Call sign meaning: Paterson State College

Technical information
- Licensing authority: FCC
- Facility ID: 72703
- Class: A
- ERP: 200 watts
- HAAT: 79.0 meters (259.2 ft)
- Transmitter coordinates: 40°59′46.4″N 74°16′49.5″W

Links
- Public license information: Public file; LMS
- Website: www.gobrave.org

WPSC-FM (88.7 FM) – branded Brave New Radio – is William Paterson University's non-commercial radio station, broadcasting a classic rock format. Licensed to Wayne, New Jersey, the station serves the north Jersey and western New York City area. In 2012, 2013, 2017 and, most recently, March 2018, the station was named Best College Radio Station (with over 10K students enrolled) by the Intercollegiate Broadcast System. Brave New Radio serves as the founding headquarters for World College Radio Day, an annual event created by the station's former general manager. In 2011, WPSC was one of the top 25 stations nominated for the mtvU Woodie Award for Best College Radio Station.

The station is staffed almost entirely by students, with a paid faculty advisor serving as the general manager. All programming, music, promotions, and creative decisions are made by students, a point of pride for the station that has been a staple in the North Jersey radio landscape for decades.

== History ==
=== 1965 - 1967: Snack Bar PA ===
The earliest form of WPSC began as a broadcasting system that fed a former student snack bar and common area was set up by enterprising students in the Fall of 1965. With the blessing and support of Dr. Anthony Maltese, this facility proved popular and was quickly upgraded. These humble beginnings set the stage for decades of radio broadcasting from William Paterson.

=== 1967 - 1988: WPSC-AM 590 ===
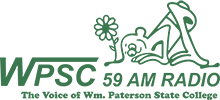
WPSC-AM 590 Logo

During the 1970s WPSC-AM broadcast on campus, both over the air and piped into various buildings on campus while the quest for an FM frequency in the very crowded NY/NJ market began. For a time (1972–1974) WPSC also had an arrangement with WFMU to broadcast a weekly 2-hour pre-recorded program on WFMU. Between 1974 and 1978, programming expanded to include hourly newscasts, live sports events, campus and community affairs, celebrity interviews, radio plays, alternative comedy, live concerts and other events all created and produced in house. Programming hours increased from 12 hours a day 5 days a week to 18 and a half hours 7 days a week.

Beginning in 1977, WPSC began broadcasting on UA Columbia Cablevision's Channel 3 bringing the station into tens of thousands of living rooms in Passaic, Morris, and Bergen Counties. Programming was mostly AOR/Progressive Rock but also included some Top 40, Oldies, and Soul/R&B/Disco shows. All programming reflected the choices of the DJs on the air during their shift and also included phoned in requests. During this time, WPSC was entirely student staffed and operated with all funding coming from WPC's Student Government Association and supplemented by a small revenue stream from commercial advertising. Faculty oversight and involvement was minimal to non-existent.

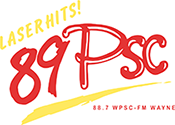
LaserHits! 89 PSC Logo

=== 1988 - 1993: Laser Hits! 89 PSC and The Only Alternative ===
The first format broadcast on WPSC's new FM frequency, Laser Hits! was predominantly a Top 40 format. The oldest music in rotation reached back only through the mid 1970s with specialty and non-format programming running during late nights and weekends only. This format ran under the direction of John Kiernan and Drew Jacobs. A programming shift in October 1992, brought the station to a more Alternative lean, running a loose Alternative rock format under the direction of general manager Drew Jacobs through the summer of 1993.

=== 1993 - 1998: HitRadio 88.7FM WPSC ===
The tightly programmed Hot Adult Contemporary format was to mimic a commercial station. Music rotation consisted of Top 30 hits from 1970-current with a heavy focus on local news, sports, and community affairs. Also known by the slogans "Your Constant Music Source," "North Jersey's Number One," and "The Spirit Of North Jersey." The format ended in June 1998 after a bitter battle between the students, who were in favor of the current format, and the Communication Department, who wanted a more traditional college radio environment.

=== 1998 - 2008: New Jersey's Independent Rock ===
An alternative and college rock format. Originally under the leadership of Ken Nagelburg, then Ron Stotyn. In the late 2000s, the format took on a Loud Rock and Punk lean, a significant change from the LaserHits! format the station flipped to in 1988.

=== 2008–present: Brave New Radio ===
With the arrival of new general manager, Rob Quicke, came a large rebranding effort to bring the station back to the forefront of FM programming in North Jersey. In 2008, WPSC rebranded to WP88.7 Brave New Radio. The format remained very similar to the previous, mainly Indie Rock, Alternative Rock, and Punk with a deep focus in playing music from local and independent artists and creating programming that would never be heard anywhere else. Under the WP88.7 moniker, the station launched its annual Braveathon, a 15-hour live broadcast supporting local musicians. Braveology was the station's flagship music show. Airing weekdays from 9 am to 7 pm, the format was labeled as WPSC's signature blend of music.

In December 2016, WPSC began to shift programming away from hard rock to better align with trends among the student body. In January 2017, Indie Pop was introduced to rotation, with early adds like Glass Animals, Phantogram, The 1975, and Coast Modern. Following the station's win for Best College Radio Station (over 10,000 students enrolled) in March 2017, the station dropped "WP88.7" and "FM" from its branding, leaving just Brave New Radio. This shift was the first step in moving WPSC into the 21st century of media by making the brand more dynamic and fluid across all platforms, digital and FM. Throughout much of 2017, programming and music selection remained the same, continuing a focus on Indie Pop and Indie Rock. In January 2018, Brave New Radio dropped Punk from the main format, dayparting Punk, Metal, and Classic Rock to late nights on Tuesdays and Wednesdays. With this shift, the station added Alternative hip hop to its main format with early adds like SZA, GoldLink, Khalid, and King Krule. In August 2021, Brave New Radio shifted to primarily focus on Alternative and underground Hip Hop, dayparting classic and alternative rock to only on weekends.

Coinciding with shifts in formatting on the air, Brave New Radio expanded its digital reach through various social media platforms and an intensive visual rebranding process. In March 2018, the station was awarded for its unique use of Instagram and Spotify to capture audience. The visual rebranding maintained the tower logo that had been an important part of Brave New Radio since its inception in 2008 and simplified the iconography for a more modern look. The WP88.7 and FM were removed and the fonts were updated to match the contemporary design of the tower. The word new is bolded in the logo instead of brave to capture the station's focus on fresh, new, original music.

By 2026, alternative hip-hop had no longer been prioritized by the station, opting for a contemporary hit radio format (classic rock was still played on weekends), running up to May 22, 2026, at 11:00 am. After playing "Damn I Love Miami" by Pitbull, WPSC-FM shifted to classic rock full-time with "Black Dog" by Led Zeppelin as its first song.

== College Radio Day ==
WPSC is the national HQ for College Radio Day, the first of which was October 11, 2011. The aim of College Radio Day is raise awareness of the many college and high school radio stations in America, and to celebrate the important medium of college radio. in 2015 a group of students and faculty attended the White House and were presented with a Letter of Support from President Barack Obama

== Programming ==
Brave New Radio broadcasts an alternative hip hop format Monday through Friday, 9 am to 7 pm. Specialty programming and non-format shows air after 7 pm during the week and all day Saturday and Sunday. A comprehensive schedule can be found on the station's website.

== Accolades ==
In 2015, WPSC-FM received their first nomination for the prestigious NAB Marconi Award for Non-commercial station of the year. After another nomination in 2017, WPSC-FM won the notable award in 2018. In 2021, WPSC-FM won their second Marconi Award for College Radio Station of the Year. In 2022, WPSC-FM became nominated for Best College Radio Station in the Nation (over 10,000 students enrolled) by the Intercollegiate Broadcasting System. This marks their tenth nomination after four wins for the category in 2012, 2013, 2017 and 2018. Other nominations in 2022 include Best Morning Show, Best Campus News Coverage, Best Program Director, Best Website and more.

== On-air guests ==
Over the years, WP 88.7 FM has featured notable on-air guests, including the bands Weezer and Steel Train, artists Jon Anderson of Yes, Dana Fuchs, John Lloyd Young and Frank Stallone, comic Carol Leifer, entertainer Penn Jillette, Janet Hubert of The Fresh Prince of Bel-Air and WFAN's Keith McPherson on College Radio Day in 2023.

== Events ==
Every year WPSC hosts a "Brave-a-thon", a day of fundraising for the station featuring 15 live, local artists. 2013 was the fifth year of the Brave-a-thon.

In 2009, WPSC had its first simulcast with WXAV, a college radio station in Chicago. The event, dubbed Unsung Underground Uprising, featured performances and interviews with We Are Scientists, Band of Skulls, and Very Emergency.

In 2011, WPSC was the national headquarters for the first ever "College Radio Day" celebrating college and high school radio in the United States with 365 stations participating.

== Notable former staff ==
- Kevin Burkhardt (Fox Sports) NFL/MLB announcer and (SportsNet New York),

== See also ==
- List of college radio stations in the United States
