= College Radio Day =

College Radio Day is an event conceived by Rob Quicke, General Manager of WPSC at William Paterson University. The company was founded in December 2010. The first event was held on October 11, 2011, with subsequent CRD events happening in the first week of October every year. In October 2014, it was announced that College Radio Day was now being run as part of a newly formed non-profit organization called the College Radio Foundation.

The aim of the event is to “raise a greater, national awareness of the many college and high school radio stations that operate in North America by encouraging people who would not normally listen to college radio to do so on this day.” This first event had over 360 participating college and high school radio stations in America, Canada and Jamaica. Because of international interest, World College Radio Day was founded in 2012, and is now celebrated the same day as College Radio Day in countries around the world outside of the US. Rob Quicke is also the co-founder of World College Radio Day.

College Radio Day is currently the subject of a documentary film in production from Killer Goose Films.

World College Radio Day (WCRD) is celebrated annually on the first Friday of October.

== College Radio Day 2012: "This Time It's Global" ==
The second College Radio Day took place on October 2, 2012. 585 college radio stations from 29 countries participated in the event. Chris Martin from Coldplay officially launched the day with a specially recorded message of support for college radio. New Jersey Governor Chris Christie issued a statewide proclamation recognizing College Radio Day, as did Rick Perry, Governor of Texas. Giorgio Napolitano, President of Italy, also issued a statement of support and congratulations for all participating Italian college radio stations. The theme for the event was "This Time It's Global" to reflect that many countries outside of the US now participated.

== College Radio Day 2013: "If You Care About Music, You Care About College Radio" ==
The third College Radio Day was on October 1, 2013. Over 700 college radio stations in 43 countries participated in the event. President Barack Obama wrote a letter of support of the event, stating that "Uniting audiences across languages and borders, World College Radio Day celebrates the students who power these stations and the unique role college radio plays across the globe.". Vice-President Joe Biden called in to WPSC radio to do an interview on the day. Additionally, Wyclef Jean played a surprise concert at WPSC radio on the campus of William Paterson University in collaboration with mtvU. Both Moby and Andrew WK also contributed exclusive interviews for the event. The theme for the event was "If You Care About Music, You Care About College Radio" to reflect the role and importance that college radio has had and continues to have in being a musical tastemaker.

== College Radio Day 2014: "Where It All Begins" ==
The fourth College Radio Day was on Friday, October 3, 2014. Again, hundreds of college radio stations came together to celebrate the event. Notable participants included Moby, Matt Kelly from the Dropkick Murphys, and Jeremiah Fraites from The Lumineers. There was also the first ever one-hour simulcast as over 70 US college radio stations came together to broadcast, at the same time across the US, a special one-hour program that highlighted the ongoing importance of college radio.

== College Radio Day 2015: "Your Authentic Guide To The Next Generation of Music" ==
The fifth College Radio Day was on Friday, October 2, 2015. Notable participants included a keynote interview by Stewart Copeland, as well as Josh Eppard of Coheed and Cambria. Taking place for the first time was a national 24 hour broadcast marathon, featuring 24 selected college radio stations from the hundreds that participated. Addition special programming for the day included a special report produced by college radio students who were invited to the White House and were presented with a letter of support from President Barack Obama to recognize and celebrate the day.
