= Killer Goose Films =

US film production company

Killer Goose Films is an independent film production company based in Manville, New Jersey. Founded by film majors from William Paterson University in 2008, Killer Goose Films has produced and co-produced nine short films and is currently in production on a feature-length documentary about College Radio Day.

== Films ==
=== Unbroken Circle (2008) ===
A co-production with Makeshift Movies, Unbroken Circle is about a man named David whose wife has been in a coma for a year. He is finally ready to move on and begin dating again. In the heat of the moment he comes face to face with the emotion and difficulty of making that choice. Unbroken Circle earned 3rd Place in the Advanced Category at the 2008 William Paterson University Film Festival.

=== The Call (2009) ===
Director Dan O. Linke also wrote the script for this short film about the H.P. Lovecraft sea monster Cthulhu. The Call stars I Sell the Dead's Brenda Cooney and was screened at the 14th annual H.P. Lovecraft Film Festival & Cthulhucon in Portland, Oregon in 2009. In 2010, The Call screened at the Eighth Annual Garden State Film Festival.

=== Design (2010) ===
A second co-production with Makeshift Movies, Design has screened at the 2013 Garden State Film Festival. The film concerns three scientists who face change in their lives, loves, and friendships when they decide to test their invention, the first mode of teleportation, on a living person.

=== Dead For Life (2010) ===
Dead For Life is about four guys with under-the-table jobs and questionable morals who find themselves in possession of a winning lottery ticket. Dead For Life was written and directed by Dale Devino and stars Dallas Coyle, former guitarist for God Forbid. In February 2010, representatives of Killer Goose Films were featured on WMSC's Peep Show, promoting Dead For Life.

=== Redistribution (2011) ===
This short science fiction film was created by Killer Goose Films in the spring of 2011 as their entry to the New York City 48 Hour Film Project competition. Redistribution centers on a young couple fleeing capture from a government bent on redistributing the population in order to better manage resources. The couple believes there is something much more sinister going on.

=== Feed A (2012) ===
Written and directed by burgeoning cinematographer Clarke Mayer, the film is a found footage sci-fi short about a SWAT team responding to a domestic disturbance call in a nice suburban home, only to find an enemy they are not prepared to face.

=== Three Guys, One Hole (2012) ===
Killer Goose Films' second entry to the New York 48 Hour Film Project, this short comedy film follows one hapless delivery girl into a zombie-riddled future. The short took home three awards from the competition: Best Use of Prop, Audience Award and Best Original Song as written and performed by the band Relentless Babies.

=== Keep Punching (2013) ===
The company's first foray into the documentary genre, Keep Punching follows one amateur boxer fighting in the New Jersey Golden Gloves competition. The film screened at the 2013 "Montclair Film Festival" and won Best Documentary Short: NJ at the 2013 Atlantic City Cinefest. Keep Punching was directed and shot by Dale DeVino.

=== Fuzz (2013) ===
Their third entry to the New York 48 Hour Film Project, Fuzz is a dark comedy short about four archetypal cops doing surveillance on a porn production house. The entire film is already online.
