= Margaret Taber =

American electrical engineer

Margaret R. Taber
- Born: Margaret Orr; April 29, 1935; St. Louis, Missouri, U.S.
- Education: University of Akron
- Occupation: Electrical engineer
- Spouse: William J. Taber

Margaret R. Taber (April 29, 1935 – June 10, 2015) was a pioneer for women in engineering. She was an electrical and electronics engineering educator. She was the author of several nonfiction books and articles on computer programming. She has had computer labs named in her honor. She has established scholarships in her name.

== Early life ==
Taber was born in St. Louis, Missouri, as the only child to Wynn Orr and Margaret Ruth (Feldman) Stevens. Her father was an electrical engineer. Her mother was a department store clerk. They divorced and her mother raised her alone during World War II.

They moved to Cleveland, Ohio, when Taber was in the sixth grade. Taber described her child-self as a tomboy. She had played with toy soldiers/sailors, pretended war, and owned a sailor suit. Before attending Wilbur Wright Junior High School, Tabor discovered the value of hard work. Tabor's favorite class at this point was physical education; she wanted to be a gym teacher.

At South High School in Akron, Ohio, Taber was inspired by many teachers. There was a math teacher who seated students according to their score on the math tests. Instead of intimidating Taber, it inspired her to compete for the first row. Taber was inspired by another unnamed teacher, who was so dedicated to their future in college that she taught physics at her own expense. The physics class was not provided by the school. Her mechanical drawing teacher allowed her to progress at her own rate. During Taber's time in high school, she decided on electrical engineering, because she believed it "took math the furthest of all the engineering".

== Education ==
In 1958, Margaret graduated from Cleveland State University in Cleveland, Ohio. She had two bachelor's degrees in electrical engineering and engineering science, with an emphasis on mathematics. In 1967, Taber obtaining her Master of Science in engineering from the University of Akron. In 1976, Margaret received an Ed.D. from Nova Southeastern University in Fort Lauderdale, Florida.

== Career ==
Taber was a licensed professional engineer and a certified engineering technologist.

Taber began her career at the Tocco Division of The Ohio Crankshaft Company as an engineering trainee and development engineer. Briefly, she was a digital systems consultant for Design and Development Inc. Then, Taber began working in academia as an instructor in electrical-electronic engineering at Cuyahoga Community College in Cleveland, Ohio. She went on to become an assistant, associate, and full professor as well as chairperson of Engineering Technologies at the college. In 1979, she became an associate professor at Purdue University and an educational consultant and writer for the Cleveland Institute of Electronics.

Taber was the only woman faculty member of Purdue University's Department of Electrical Engineering Technology. She received tenure as an associate professor, was made full professor (1983-2000), and became a professor emeritus in 2000.

Taber has designed, developed, and taught many fundamental and advanced microprocessor courses. She has also written several books/manuals and articles on computer programming.

=== Professional influence ===
Taber was extremely supportive of women in engineering.

When Taber retired, Purdue University dedicated the Margaret R. Taber Microcomputer Lab in her honor.

In 1993, she established the Dr. Margaret R. Taber Scholarship for Women in Engineering to provide for outstanding women engineering students at the University of Akron. In 2007, she established a second scholarship fund for women in Electronic Engineering Technology.

=== Awards ===
In 1987, Taber received the 1987 Distinguished Engineering Educator Award from the Society of Women Engineers. In 1991, she was honored with the Helen B. Schleman Gold Medallion Award at Purdue University. She also received the Survivorship Award from the Greater Lafayette community. In 1994, she received the Outstanding Alumni Award from the University of Akron. In 2002, Taber received the Lifetime Leadership award from Cleveland State University.

In 2009, Taber received the President’s Award for Leadership, Volunteer Service & Philanthropy from Rainbow Acres in Arizona. In 2012, Margaret was honored with the YWCA Woman of Distinction Award for her "willingness to go the extra mile, extreme tenacity, enthusiasm for life and reliability, a true inspiration for many."

== Personal life ==
Margaret married William J. Taber on September 6, 1958. Her husband's death preceded hers by 2 days, on June 8, 2015.

=== Philanthropy ===
Taber spent her retirement volunteering for organizations such as the American Cancer Society, CanSurmount 1993-1998, and the computer lab of the Lafayette Adult Reading Academy. Taber was a dedicated member of the Federated Church for 35 years. She had a passion for mission work. She volunteered at Rainbow Acres in Arizona for 25 years to help adults with developmental disabilities, including the creation and ongoing support of a computer lab and the teaching of computer skills.
