= Richard M. Perloff =

American academic (born 1951)

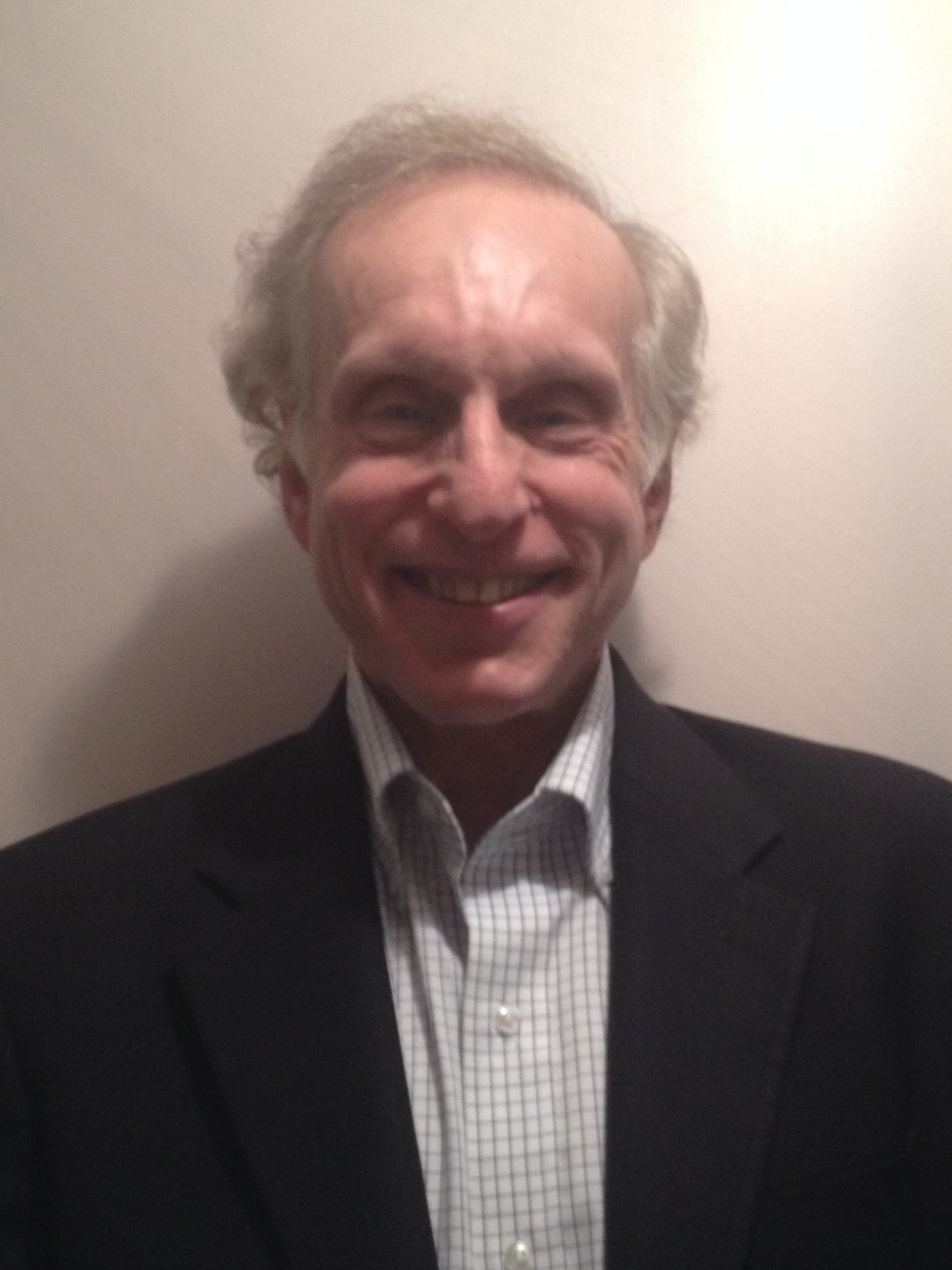
- Born: July 28, 1951 (age 75)
- Occupation: University professor
- Children: 2
- Awards: (1998)

Academic background
- Education: University of Wisconsin at Madison PhD., 1978, University of Pittsburgh, M.A., 1975,University of Michigan, B.A., 1972
- Thesis: (1978)

Academic work
- Era: Modern
- Discipline: Communication
- Sub-discipline: Political Science
- Institutions: Cleveland State University at School of Communication
- Main interests: Communication, psychology, persuasion, behavoiral sciences
- Notable works: The Dynamics of Persuasion (1993); Political Communication: Politics, Press, and Public in America (1998)
- Website: Faculty profile

Richard M. Perloff is an American academic. He is professor of communication at Cleveland State University, where he has taught since 1979. He has written on persuasion, on political communication, on the psychology of perception of the effects of mass media, and on the third-person effect.

== Publications ==
Perloff's published work includes:

- The Dynamics of Persuasion. Hillsdale, New Jersey: Lawrence Erlbaum, 1993
  - Fifth edition, London; New York: Routledge, 2014.
- Political Communication: Politics, Press, and Public in America. Mahwah, New Jersey: Lawrence Erlbaum Associates, 1998.
- Persuading People to have Safer Sex: Applications of Social Science to the AIDS Crisis. Mahwah, New Jersey: Lawrence Erlbaum Associates, 2001.
- The Dynamics of Political Communication: Media and Politics in a Digital Age. Abingdon; New York: Routledge, 2014.

In 2006 he was editor of a special issue of American Behavioral Scientist on racial health-care disparities and communication.

== Awards ==
Perloff was the recipient of the 2014 University of Amsterdam School of Communication Research McQuail Award for his article on media effects research.

Perloff was awarded "Best in Ohio Essay Writing" honors in 2022 from the Ohio Press Club for his article memorializing Alan Canfora—a victim of the Kent State University shootings in 1970.
