= Ronald M. Berkman =

American academic administrator

Ronald M. Berkman (born April 17, 1947) was the president of Cleveland State University (CSU), a position he assumed July 1, 2009. Berkman has been a peripatetic academic, working at Princeton's Woodrow Wilson School, the University of California, Berkeley, Brooklyn College, New York University, and the University of Puerto Rico.

== Education ==
He started college as a part-time student at William Paterson College while working to support his mother. He supported himself in college by driving a beer truck and by working in a liquor store and a gypsum factory. He eventually became a full-time student and majored in urban sociology. He received his Ph.D. from Princeton University in 1977.

== Florida International University ==
Berkman was a dean at Baruch College and dean of urban affairs for the City University of New York. In 1990, Berkman was the director of the Urban Summit.

Berkman was Provost and Executive Vice President and Chief Operating Officer at Florida International University in Miami, where he was in the C-suite from 1997 through 2007. Berkman began his time at FIU as dean of the College of Urban and Public Affairs. He was later Executive Dean over the Nursing, Health Sciences, Public Health, Social Work, and some other programs. He was also involved with FIU working to open colleges of Law and Medicine. He has also served as Executive Dean of the College of Health and Urban Affairs at FIU.

== Cleveland State University ==
It became known on April 24, 2009, that Berkman would be the new president at Cleveland State University. He was voted unanimously as the new president of Cleveland State University on April 26, 2009. He assumed his position there on July 1, 2009. As of 2009 Berkman's initial base salary was $400,000 a year, which is more than all but two public university presidents in Ohio. He was the subject of controversy when it was learned that CSU, a publicly funded university, would be paying up to $85,000 towards Berkman's home. In January 2013 he signed a contract extension through 2017. In April 2013 the Cleveland State Faculty Senate voted 31-11 for a vote of no confidence in Berkman over the transition of CSU from a four credit hour per class university to a three credit hour per class university.

In October 2017, Berkman was criticized for failing to condemn homophobic flyers on campus. Below was his first issued statement that was highly criticized:

At Cleveland State University, our foremost priority is maintaining a welcoming environment that provides opportunities for learning, expression and discourse.

CSU remains fully committed to a campus community that respects all individuals, regardless of age, race, color, religion, national origin, sexual orientation and other historical bases for discrimination.

CSU also is committed to upholding the First Amendment, even with regard to controversial issues where opinion is divided. We will continue to protect free speech to ensure all voices may be heard and to promote a civil discourse where educational growth is the desired result.

Be assured that a spirit of inclusiveness will always be central to the very identity of our University.

— Ronald Berkman

== Books Written ==
- Opening the Gates: The Rise of the Prisoner's Movement (Lexington: Lexington Books, 1979), ISBN 0-669-02828-2.
- Politics in the Media Age (New York: McGraw Hill Book Company, 1986), ISBN 0070048827.

== Personal life ==
He was born on April 17, 1947, to Sidney and Hannah Berkman. When Berkman was 19 years old, his father Sidney Berkman died from complications from cancer. Berkman currently is married to Patsy Bilbao-Berkman. They are the parents of four children. At the time of his appointment to be president of CSU, his wife was a recruiter for the University of New Mexico, but operating primarily in Florida. He became the first Cleveland State University president to live outside Shaker Heights, Ohio.

He has also written an article for The Huffington Post.
