= Rhodes Tower =

Skyscraper in Cleveland, Ohio

Coordinates: 41°30′11.4″N 81°40′32.2″W

James A. Rhodes Tower
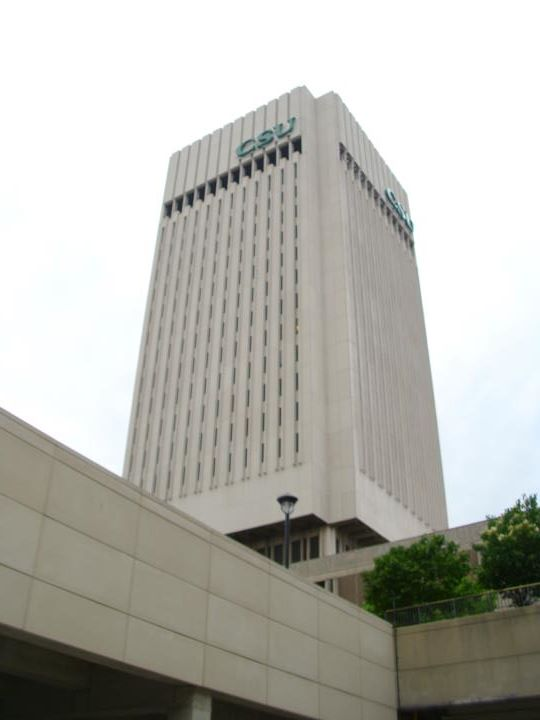
- CSU's Rhodes Tower from East 22nd
- Interactive map of the James A. Rhodes Tower area

General information
- Type: Library and Staff Offices
- Architectural style: Brutalist
- Location: 2121 Euclid Avenue; Cleveland, Ohio, USA
- Construction started: 1968
- Completed: 1971
- Opening: September 21, 1971
- Cost: $ 21.7 million
- Owner: Cleveland State University

Height
- Antenna spire: 363 feet
- Top floor: 20

Design and construction
- Architects: Rode, Guenther, and Bonebrake

The James A. Rhodes Tower, originally known as University Tower, is a 21-story high-rise building on the campus of Cleveland State University in downtown Cleveland, Ohio, United States. With a height of 363 feet (111 m), it is the fourth-tallest educational-purposed building in the United States, behind the Cathedral of Learning, Vertical Campus at Roosevelt University in Chicago, and 25 Park Place in Atlanta which is now owned by Georgia State University. It houses the university's main library on the first eight floors and administration offices for many of the university's academic departments on the upper level floors. It previously held classrooms on the first two floors. It is the tallest structure on the Cleveland State campus, followed by Fenn Tower, and the tallest academic building in Ohio. The tower was named after former Ohio Governor James A. Rhodes who is responsible for signing the legislation that created Cleveland State University on December 18, 1964.

== Construction ==
CSU Rhodes Tower was built between 1968–1971. The Brutalist structure was designed by the Cleveland architectural firm of Rode, Guenther, and Bonebrake. This style was very prevalent in the 1960s and 1970s in Cleveland and can be seen in the housing projects made in Central and Hough, the Cuyahoga County Justice Center Complex, the Cleveland Museum of Art, and AT Tower. It was built at a cost of $21,700,000 including the 2001 renovation. It is a steel structure, clad in white precast concrete panels. There are 2140 separate panels that make up the facing of the massive square tower. When the tower was built, there was controversy over floors shifting; the shifting was caused by ill-fitting bolt fasteners imported from Japan. These bolts had to be replaced with bolts made in the US, not because the Japanese ones were somehow inferior, they simply did not fit the holes. This was due to the fact that the bolts were made in metric in Japan and the floors were built in standard, as such when the buildings crew began to fasten the bolts to the floor joists, the structures unexpectedly shifted. This expensive refabrication thus made the building fit for public use.

== Position on campus ==
On September 21, 1971 University Tower opened for university use. The University Tower was and remains CSU's main focal point and it opens the Downtown Cleveland skyline to the east. In addition, the tower sits as almost the exact geographic center of the campus and is used as a reference point when guiding students and visitors towards points of the campus grounds. The tower building actually sits high above the street level as the Cleveland State University Library is housed in the bottom of the building platforms first 8 floors.

== History ==
In 1981, the tower was renamed after Governor James A. Rhodes. In 2001, a major renovation of the tower was commenced to fix the problems regarding lack of insulation from the weather and leaks caused by this that were never addressed when the tower was built. In 2002, CSU placed signs on the top of the tower In December 2011, CSU officials announced plans to mothball portions of the building due to the prohibitive cost of renovation, including asbestos abatement. However, if this is going to occur has not been decided. The top floors are still being used for college administration offices. In November 2022, CSU officials announced plans to renovate Rhodes Tower for student housing as part of the school's new master plan. The building was listed on the National Register of Historic Places in 2023.

== See also ==
- List of tallest buildings in Cleveland
- List of tallest educational buildings
- Brutalist architecture
