= Laura J. Bloomberg =

American academic administrator

8th President of Cleveland State University
- Incumbent
- Assumed office April 2022
- Preceded by: Harlan M. Sands

Personal details
- Education: St. Cloud State University (BS); Cornell University (MS); University of Minnesota (PhD)
- Website: Official website

Academic background
- Thesis: Theories of action in interagency collaboratives: An exploratory study (1997)
- Doctoral advisor: Robert Bruininks

Academic work
- Discipline: Education
- Institutions: University of Minnesota; Cleveland State University

Laura J. Bloomberg is an American administrator in higher education and the eighth president of Cleveland State University (CSU) in Cleveland, Ohio, United States. Bloomberg served as CSU's provost before being appointed president in 2022.

Prior to her career at CSU, she held the positions of dean and associate dean of the Humphrey School of Public Affairs at the University of Minnesota.

== Early life and education ==
Bloomberg earned a Bachelor of Science in special education and teaching from St. Cloud State University, a Master of Science in education psychology and measurement from Cornell University, and a Ph.D. in educational policy and administration from the University of Minnesota (UM).

== Career ==
Bloomberg began her tenure at the University of Minnesota as the associate director of the Institute on Community Integration and taught in the Educational Policy and Administration Department. Bloomberg also served as principal and K-12 district administrator of the West Metro Education Program.

In 2013, Bloomberg was appointed associate dean of the Humphrey School of Public Affairs. Four years later, she became the school's seventh dean and first female dean.

In 2021, Bloomberg left UM to become the provost and senior vice president for academic affairs at Cleveland State University (CSU). Bloomberg was named the university's eighth president on April 26, 2022, succeeding Harlan M. Sands. While never having visited the Greater Cleveland region prior to joining CSU, Bloomberg was allegedly drawn to working at a state-run university, and toured the region with her husband Jon. Bloomberg was briefly on the short list for UM president in the spring of 2024; after being passed over by the UM regents, Bloomberg declined to seek the presidency of any other institution. Bloomberg signed a five-year contract extension with CSU on May 16, 2024.

=== CSU presidency and controversies ===
In July 2024, Cleveland State University reported a $150 million budget shortfall due to declining enrollment trends, and froze or eliminated 42 bachelor and master degree programs. Accounting firm Ernst & Young was retained on a $900,000 contract, which was funded externally; the firm recommended making these cuts, along with $10.1 million in contract buyouts to faculty and staff, or risk exhausting $147 million in monetary reserves over the next five years. Bloomberg and CSU's board of trustees presided over a five-year strategic plan that was drafted at the end of 2024. While Bloomberg and CSU mutually agreed to forgo her annual performance bonus with her 2024 contract extension, she was granted a 25% bonus and 3% raise in May 2025, owing to "significant accomplishments".

In July 2025, Bloomberg announced CSU would shut down its U-Pass program, limiting access to public transit for those previously issued passes. More cuts were reported by September 2025 regarding CSU's LGBTQ+ and Women's Center and other campus programs related to Diversity, Equality, & Inclusion (DEI) initiatives as a result of Ohio Senate Bill 1, despite Bloomberg's public opposition. On August 28, 2025, Bloomberg announced CSU entered into negotiations with the United Soccer League that called for the demolition of the Wolstein Center. CSU sold their presidential house in Cleveland Heights for $1 million in late September 2025, with the university estimating an annual savings of $145,000; Bloomberg, who was granted a housing allowance, opted to reside in the city. By December 2025, Bloomberg asserted the university now operated on a balanced budget even as contract negotiations between CSU, the AAUP and SEIU District 1199 were still ongoing.

WCSB, the university's radio station, was leased out to Ideastream Public Media on October 3, 2025, under an eight-year public service operating agreement, with Ideastream's mainstream jazz service supplanting the prior campus format. Prior to this, CSU failed to provide promised scholarships to student staff for the upcoming academic year and the station's faculty advisor retired. Bloomberg described the lease, which was announced abruptly after months of internal negotiations, as "cost neutral". University police escorted staff out of the WCSB studios minutes after the announcement was made; Bloomberg later asserted the staff were broadcasting without authorization and were let in by the same campus police after their keycard access had been revoked. CSU, Bloomberg and Ideastream were criticized and protested by students, on-air volunteers, community leaders and Cleveland City Council. Bloomberg was also named to Ideastream's board of directors as part of the agreement. Bloomberg defended the WCSB changeover in a December 2025 interview with The Cleveland Stater, while also denouncing some of the criticism as "pretty vicious feedback" and that several postings and comments were turned over to the FBI as "threatening". Former WCSB staff, including prior station manager Alison Bomgardner, filed a lawsuit against CSU and Bloomberg over the lease, but did not name Ideastream as a defendant.

== Personal life ==
Laura J. Bloomberg is married to environmental attorney Jon Bloomberg.

== Publications ==
- Public Value and Public Administration (co-editor)
- Creating Public Value in Practice: Advancing the Common Good in a Multi-Sector, Shared-Power, No-One-Wholly-in-Charge World (co-editor)
