= Cleveland State University =

Public university in Cleveland, Ohio, US

Coordinates: 41.5017°N 81.6751°W

- Former names: Cleveland YMCA School of Technology (1921–1929); Fenn College (1929–1964); Cleveland Law School (1897–1946); Marshall School of Law (1916–1946); Cleveland-Marshall School of Law (1946–1967)
- Type: Public research university
- Established: December 18, 1964; 61 years ago
- Parent institution: University System of Ohio
- Accreditation: HLC
- Academic affiliations: CUMU; GCU; USU; Space-grant
- Endowment: $168 million (2026)
- President: Laura J. Bloomberg
- Provost: Nigamanth Sridhar
- Faculty: 1,235 (2026)
- Administrative staff: 1,035 (2026)
- Students: 13,068 (fall 2025)
- Undergraduates: 8,761 (fall 2025)
- Postgraduates: 4,307 (fall 2025)
- Location: Cleveland, Ohio, United States
- Campus: 85 acres (34 ha); Large city
- Newspaper: The Cauldron
- Colors: University green, fresh green
- Nickname: Vikings
- Sporting affiliations: NCAA Division I – Horizon League; MAC; ASUN; CCFC
- Mascot: Magnus
- Website: www.csuohio.edu

Cleveland State University (CSU) is a public research university in Cleveland, Ohio, United States. It was established in 1964 and opened for classes in 1965 after acquiring the entirety of Fenn College, a private school that had been in operation since 1923. CSU absorbed the Cleveland-Marshall School of Law in 1969. Today it is part of the University System of Ohio, has more than 120,000 alumni, and offers over 200 academic programs amongst eight colleges. It is classified among "R2: Doctoral Universities – High research activity".

== History ==
Public higher education in Cleveland was first started in 1870, when Cleveland YMCA began to offer free classes. By 1921, the program had grown enough to become separate from YMCA, being renamed Cleveland YMCA School of Technology. Two years later, the school offered courses towards a bachelor's degree in business and engineering for the first time. This is now regarded as Fenn College's founding date, although the college would not be formally renamed until 1929. Fenn College took over several buildings in the area including Fenn Tower, Stilwell Hall, and Foster Hall.

In 1964, the State of Ohio purchased the entirety of Fenn College's campus in downtown Cleveland and established a commuter college that targeted area residents. This new institution became known as Cleveland State University. The university consisted of the Fenn College of Engineering (now the Washkewicz College of Engineering), the colleges of business administration, arts and sciences and education. Industrialist James J. Nance served as Chair of the first Board of Trustees.

Over the next several decades, Cleveland State University quickly grew in size and claimed over 15,000 students in 1997. However, only six hundred students resided in university housing. In the mid-2000s, President Michael Schwartz ended open admissions and implemented a vision to move from a U.S. News & World Report fourth-tier university to a second-tier university. The university entered into a partnership with Northeast Ohio Medical University in 2008.

In 2012, CSU opened the Galleries at CSU on Euclid Avenue. Also in 2012, Cleveland State University partnered with the South China University of Technology allowing students to complete their education and receive joint degrees. In 2018, CSU established the CSU School of Film & Media Arts, having used a $7.5 million appropriation from the State of Ohio to renovate an entire floor of the IdeaStream Center at Playhouse Square. It is the first standalone film school in Ohio.

On March 11, 2020, an email was sent to Cleveland State students regarding the changes made due to the coronavirus pandemic. Classes were all switched to remote learning.

In fall 2020, students returned to campus with safety precautions in place. CSU continues to offer robust hybrid and remote learning opportunities.

CSU celebrated a major milestone in 2014, marking its 50th anniversary, and in 2024, celebrated its 60th anniversary and invited all members of the CSU community to contribute items to a special time capsule project.

In 2025, CSU launched a new vision for Cleveland’s public research university, known as Cleveland State United. Through an inclusive process that included ideas and feedback from current students, faculty and staff members, alumni, trustees and community partners, Cleveland State University created a set of mission, vision and value statements that reflect CSU’s strengths and aspirations.

== Campus ==
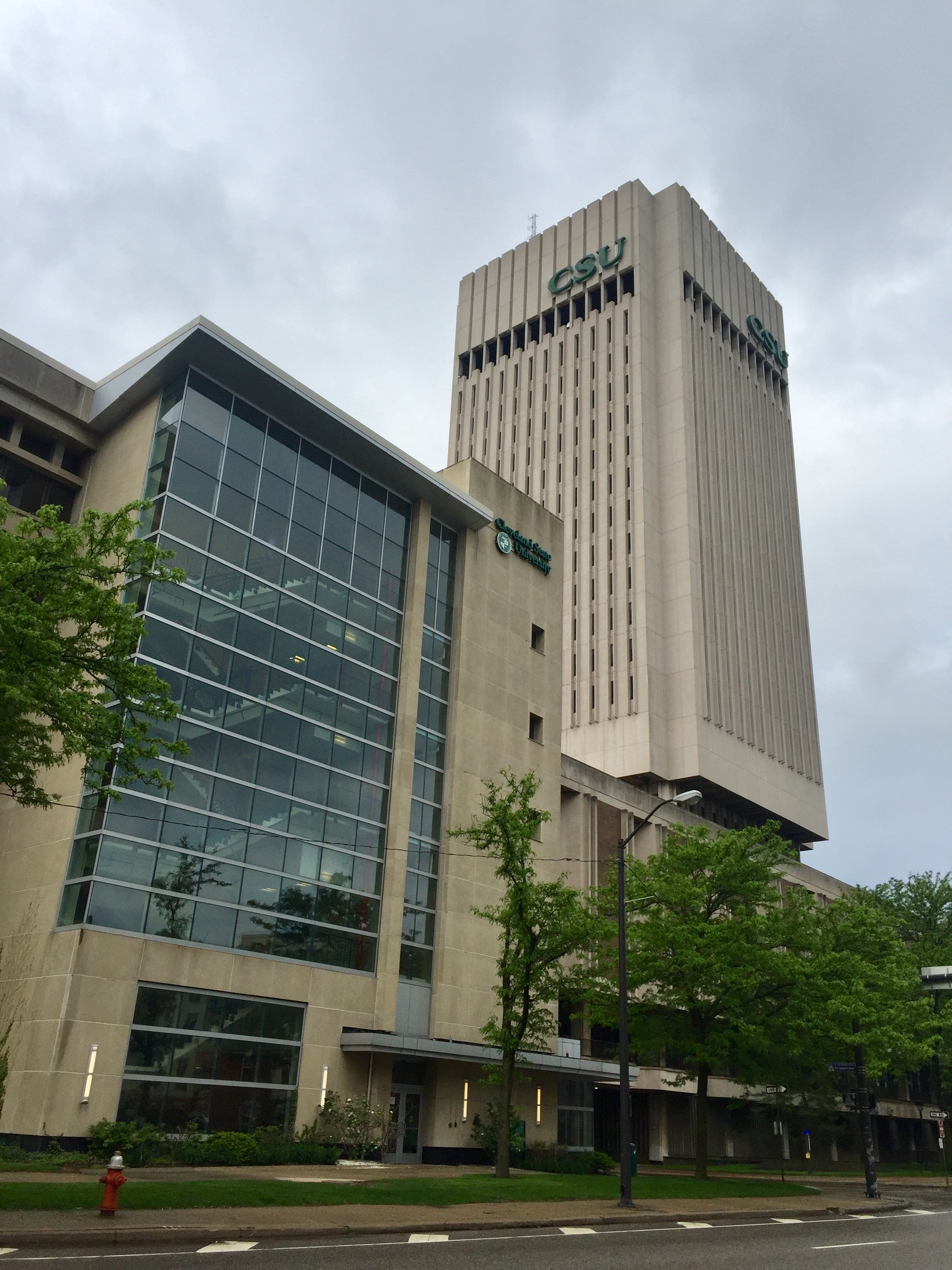
Rhodes Tower

CSU's main campus in downtown Cleveland is bounded on the east and west by Interstate 90 and East 17th Street, respectively; and by Payne Avenue to the north and Carnegie Avenue on the south.

In 2006, Cleveland State University completed its student Recreation Center and a renovation of Parker Hannifin Hall for the College of Graduate Studies. To make the campus more amenable to residence and increase the number of students living on campus thousands of housing units were built, anchored by a new dormitory, Fenn Tower, a reuse of the school's most historic building. Fenn Tower housed what was the world's longest Foucault pendulum, but the pendulum was removed during the residence hall renovation in 2006 and is now in the Cleveland State University archives.

The university worked with private developers and the City of Cleveland to develop housing, retail, and "collegetown" amenities around Fenn Tower, particularly along the main thoroughfare of Euclid Avenue. In 2010, Euclid Avenue was upgraded as part of the Euclid Corridor Project which brought bus rapid transit to the university and connected Public Square in downtown Cleveland to University Circle, approximately four miles to the east. Cleveland State University's $65 million construction project, intended to transform the campus from a mostly commuter school into a residential campus, included the new Student Center and Julka Hull, which houses the College of Education and School of Nursing. Both projects were finished in 2010. In 2011, the new Euclid Commons dorms complex, which features apartment-style living for CSU students, opened. That same year, the university's Dramatic Arts Program moved into the renovated Middough Building and Allen Theatre at Playhouse Square Center in collaboration with the Cleveland Play House.

During the fall semester of 2012, the first phase of the private Langston apartment and retail complex opened along Chester Avenue across from Rhodes Tower. In the spring semester of 2013, the former Viking Hall dormitory was torn down to make way for the university's new Center for Health Professions. This was opened in the fall of 2015.

In November 2025, CSU announced the renovation of two of its most historic buildings, Fenn Tower and Fenn Hall would be reopened for fall semester 2026 as part of Cleveland State United, CSU's multi-year strategic plan to advance academic offerings, foster student success and expand talent development for the region.

== Administration ==
The Cleveland State University Board consists of nine trustees, a Secretary to the Board, two faculty representatives, and two student representatives.

=== Presidents ===
The current president is Laura J. Bloomberg; she took office in 2022.

Seal of Fenn College, 1923-1964

== Academics ==
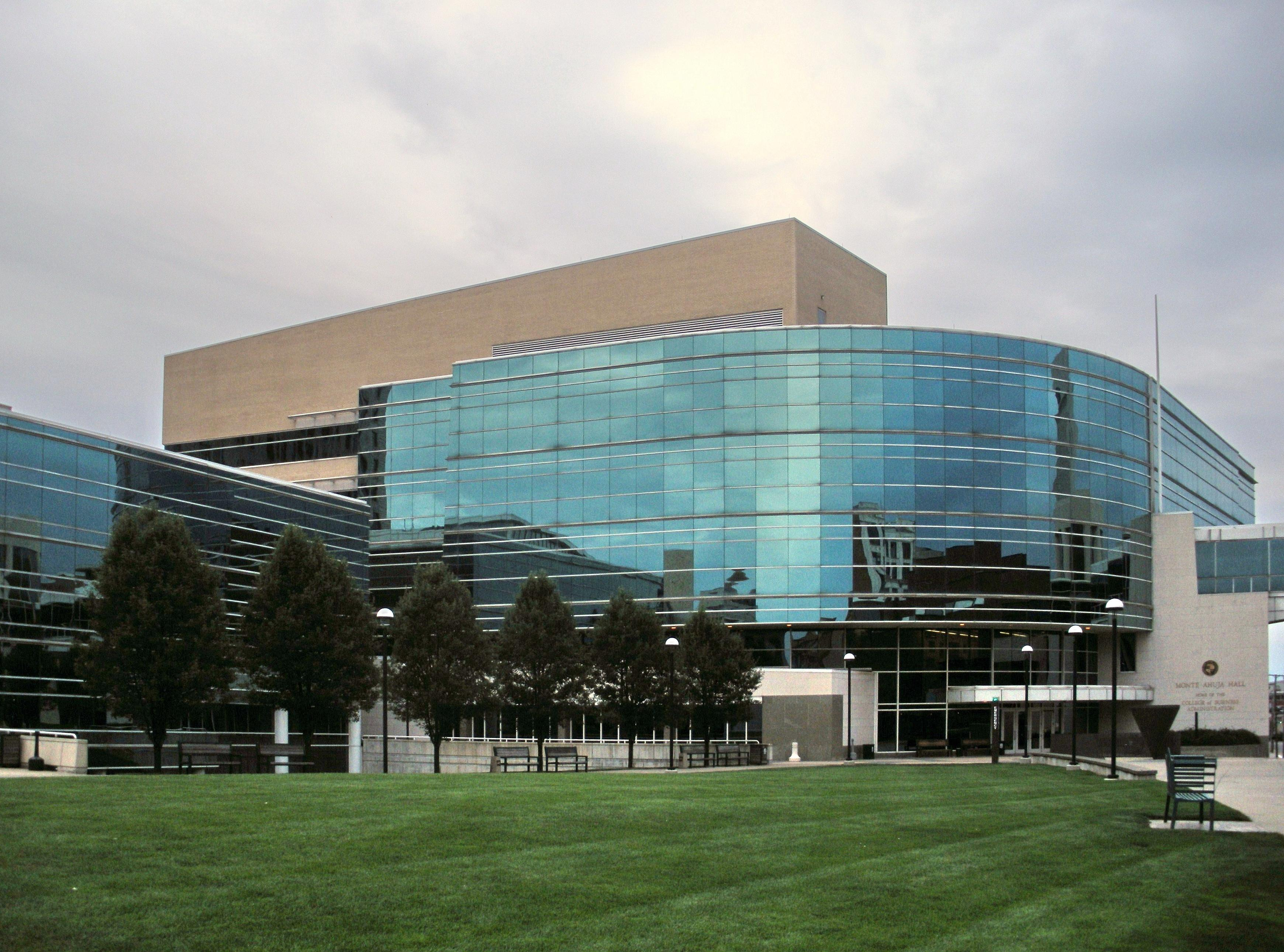
Monte Ahuja College of Business

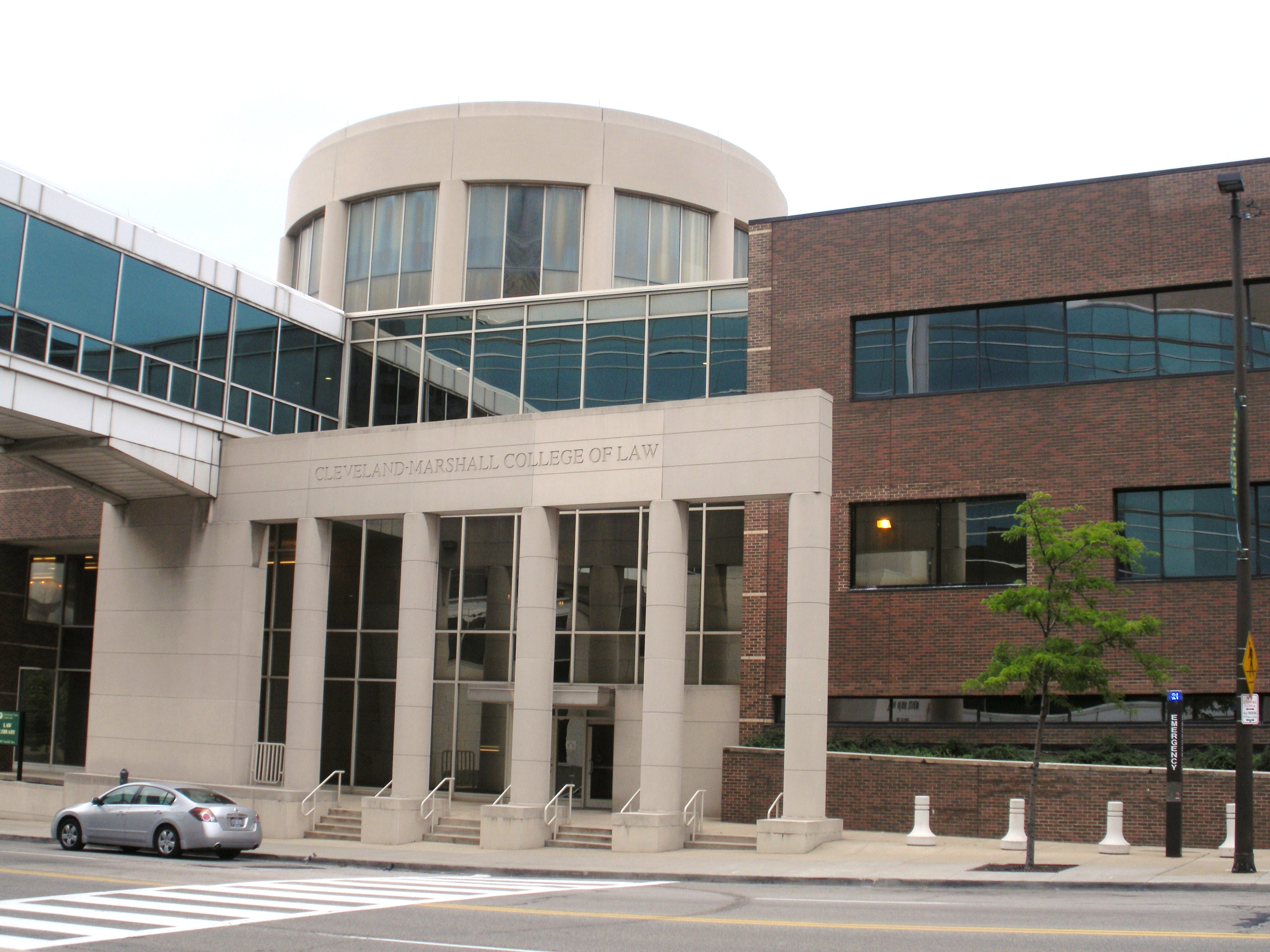
Cleveland State University College of Law

CSU offers many disciplines and research facilities, with more than 175 academic programs. It also has research cooperation agreements with the nearby NASA Glenn Research Center.

In 2022, the university reorganized around eight colleges as part of its CSU 2.0 initiative:

- College of Arts and Sciences
- College of Graduate Studies
- College of Health
- College of Law
- Jack, Joseph and Morton Mandel Honors College
- Levin College of Public Affairs and Education (includes the Maxine Goodman Levin School of Urban Affairs)
- Monte Ahuja College of Business
- Washkewicz College of Engineering

The Division of Student Belonging and Success focuses on support services for students, and the Division of Extended Education extends academic services beyond the campus.

The College of Law traces its origins to the founding of Cleveland Law School in 1897. One of the most famous alumni of the College of Law was Tim Russert, host of television program Meet the Press, who graduated in 1976. It was formerly known as the Cleveland–Marshall College of Law, until the school dropped Marshall's name from the school in 2022.

The university is partnered with Northeast Ohio Medical University to train future healthcare professionals in urban settings. Undergraduate students at CSU can obtain early admission to medical school and obtain a certificate in urban health.

=== Reputation and rankings ===
Academic rankings

National
- Forbes: 196
- U.S. News & World Report: 342 (tie)
- Washington Monthly: 217

Global
- QS: 1201-1400
- U.S. News & World Report: 1845 (tie)

In its 2025 rankings, U.S. News & World Report ranked the university's undergraduate program 342nd (tied) among 436 national universities, and 183rd among public national universities. The Levin College of Public Affairs and Education was placed fourth in urban policy and 13th in the local government management in the 2019 U.S. News & World Report ranking of graduate public affairs programs.

=== Research ===
Cleveland State maintains a variety of research links within Ohio. These research collaborations include Case Western Reserve University, Cleveland Clinic Lerner Research Institute, Cleveland MetroHealth Medical Center, Council for International Exchange of Scholars, NASA Glenn Research Center, Great Lakes Science Center, Cleveland Museum of Art, Cleveland Museum of Natural History, International Space University, Internet2, Ohio College of Podiatric Medicine, Ohio Department of Education, and the Ohio Supercomputer Center.

== Student life ==
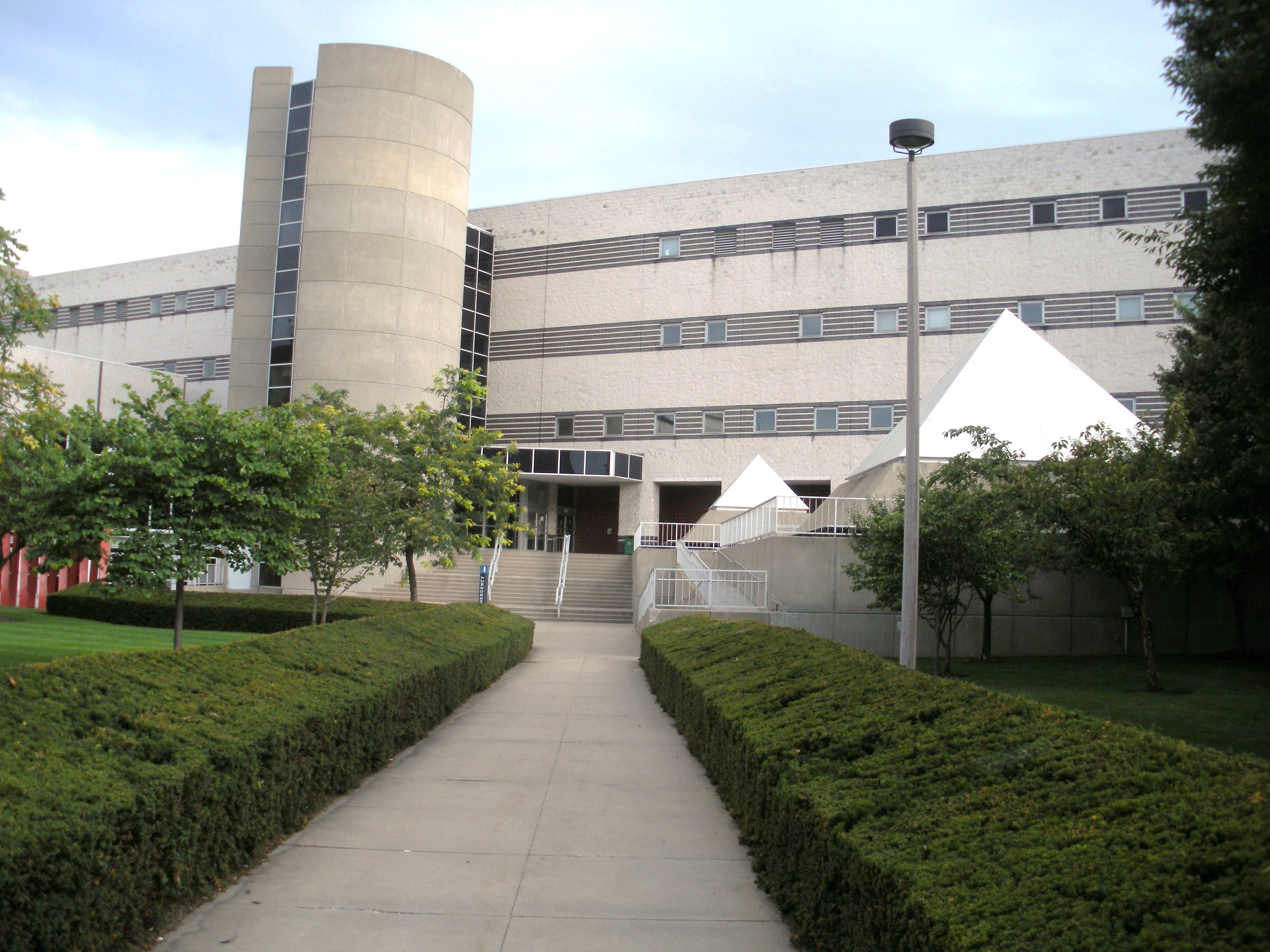
Music and Communication Building

=== Student media ===
Cleveland State University is served in print by The Cauldron, an independent student newspaper, The Cleveland Stater, a laboratory newspaper in the School of Communication, The Vindicator, Cleveland State University's art and culture magazine, and The Gavel which won the 2005 and 2023 American Bar Association's -Student Division's first prize for the best law school newspaper in the country. CSU-TV is a student organization created by students with support from the School of Communication and the School of Film and Media Arts. Both schools collaborate to create curriculum in digital content creation, multimedia production and broadcasting. --add link

In 2025, the University transferred its license of WCSB (89.3 FM) to Ideastream Public Media. Originally featuring a campus radio format with a mixture of students, alumni and volunteers on their staff, WCSB has been operated by Ideastream Public Media, the region's public media broadcaster, beginning on October 3, 2025.

=== Information technology ===
CSU is a member of the OneCommunity (formerly OneCleveland) computer network, an initiative of Case Western Reserve University that connects nonprofit institutions throughout Northeast Ohio, allowing large scale collaborations over a high-speed fiber optic network.

=== Greek organizations ===
Cleveland State University is home to 4 NIC fraternities, Delta Sigma Phi, Sigma Phi Epsilon, Sigma Tau Gamma, and Tau Kappa Epsilon. There are 3 NPC sororities, Delta Zeta, Phi Mu, and Theta Phi Alpha and all 9 NPHC organizations have a chapter affiliated with the campus.

== Athletics ==
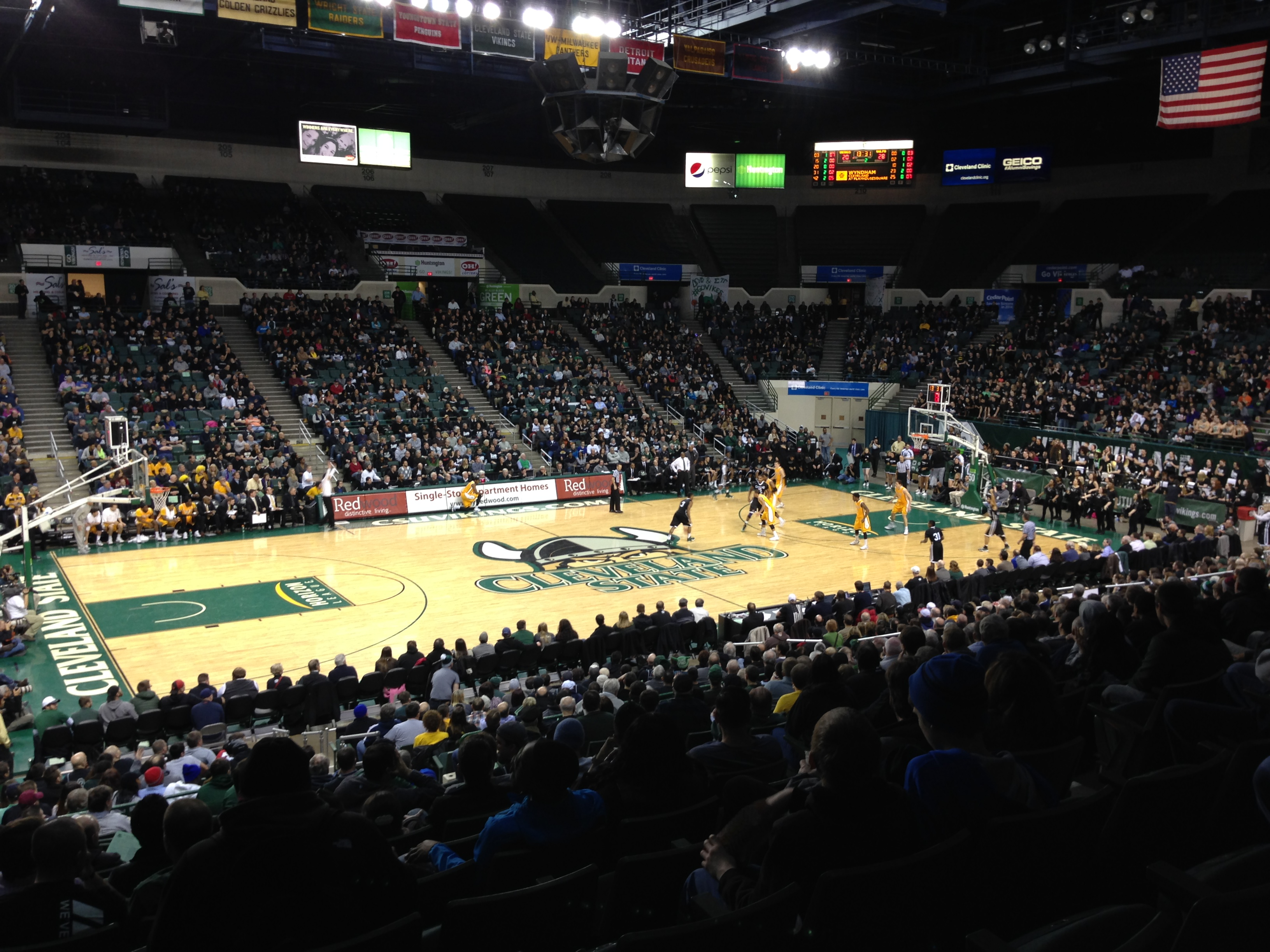
A Cleveland State Vikings men's basketball game at the Wolstein Center.

When the school was still known as Fenn College, the sports teams' nickname was the Foxes. When the university was renamed Cleveland State, the nickname changed as well, and CSU's sports teams became the "Vikings". That nickname stands to this day. The school colors are university green, fresh green and white. For many years the school mascot was the comic strip character Hägar the Horrible along with his wife Helga, and the couple appeared at sporting events as well as on University literature. A new mascot, "Vike" was introduced in 1997 and Hagar was phased out by 1998. Another new mascot named "Magnus" was introduced in August 2007.

Cleveland State fields varsity teams in 15 sports, with most teams competing in the Horizon League. The men's basketball team was noteworthy in 1986 when seeded 14th in the East Region of the NCAA tournament, it upset heavily favored 3-seed Indiana and Saint Joseph's before a one-point loss to a Navy team led by future Hall of Famer David Robinson, an unprecedented achievement for such a low seed. The Vikes made yet another NCAA tournament appearance in 2009, upsetting the highly favored 4 seed Wake Forest before falling to Arizona in the second round. The school fields two teams that compete outside the Horizon League; wrestling competes in the Mid-American Conference and men's lacrosse in the ASUN Conference.

=== Football ===
On October 14, 2008, CSU President Michael Schwartz stated "he wants a blue ribbon panel to give him a recommendation on the football team before July 1, 2009, when he was scheduled to retire. He also said the program will have to be structured to pay for itself." The establishment of a football team became an official item on the student government election ballot. Although over two-thirds of the voters favored establishment of a football team over half of them were not willing to pay a fee for Division I non-scholarship football in addition to any potential future tuition increases that may be instituted by the university.

== See also ==
- Krenzler Field
- Wolstein Center
