= Opinion polling for the 2018 Slovenian parliamentary election =

In the run up to the 2018 Slovenian parliamentary election, various organisations carry out opinion polling to gauge voting intention in Slovenia. Results of such polls are displayed in this article.

The date range for these opinion polls are from the previous general election, held on 13 July 2014, to the present day. The next parliamentary election was held on 3 June 2018.

== Pollsters ==
There are multiple opinion research companies that conduct election polling on a regular basis within Slovenia, generally publishing poll results on a monthly basis:

- Episcenter, published by Planet SiOL.net and Planet TV;
- Mediana, published by the Slovenian television channel POP TV and their respective multimedia web portal 24ur.com;
- Ninamedia, variably published by either POP TV, the public broadcaster RTV SLO and/or the Slovenian daily newspaper Dnevnik;
- Delo Stik, which is the in-house opinion polling organization of the Slovenian daily newspaper Delo;
- Parsifal SC, which conducts opinion polling for the conservative news media enterprise Nova24TV (Parsifal is (like Nova24TV itself) tied to the largest Slovene conservative party, SDS).

== Poll results ==
Poll results are listed in the table in reverse chronological order, showing the most recent first. The highest figure in each survey is displayed in bold, and the background shaded in the leading party's colour. In case of a tie, no figure is shaded.

Date	Polling firm/Publisher(s)	Sample size	SDS	LMŠ	SD	SMC	The Left	NSi	PAB	DeSUS	SNS	SLS	GOD	NLS	PS	DL	Oth.	None	Und.	Not vote	Lead
**3 June 2018**	**Election results**	**891,076**	**24.9%**	**12.6%**	**9.9%**	**9.8%**	**9.3%**	**7.2%**	**5.1%**	**4.9%**	**4.2%**	**2.6%**	**0.2%**		–	–	**9.3%**	–	–	**(47.4%)**	**12.3%**
3 June 2018	Mediana/RTVSLO/POPTV/Planet TV	1636	**24.4%**	12.6%	9.3%	9.8%	9.5%	6.6%	5.5%	5.0%	4.3%	2.6%	0.3%		–	–	–	–	–		11.8%
**Exit polls**
31 May 2018	Mediana/POPTV	1037	**23.7%**	11.2%	7.8%	7.7%	7.9%	5.7%	5.7%	4.5%	4.0%	2.5%	–		–	–	6.7%	3.8%	5.7%	0.2%	12.5%
31 May 2018	Ninamedia/Dnevnik/Večer	900	**26.1%**	11.5%	12.8%	9.8%	8.3%	7.3%	3.2%	7.9%	3.4%	3.8%	–		–	–	5.9%	–	–	–	14.6%
28–31 May 2018	Valicon	2255	**15.1%**	10.7%	11.5%	7.1%	7.9%	6.2%	3.8%	4.2%	3.3%	2.5%	0.4%		–	–	–	7.1%	5.8%	–	4.4%
26–31 May 2018	Mediana/RTVSLO	1037	**16.5%**	8.3%	5.6%	4.4%	6.9%	4.6%	3.2%	3.9%	4.1%	1.5%	–		–	–	–	9.2%	20.7%	–	8.2%
25–30 May 2018	Mediana/Delo	1006	**16.3%**	7.6%	5.5%	4.8%	6.8%	4.7%	2.7%	4.7%	3.9%	2.1%	0.1%		–	–	–	–	33.0%	–	8.7%
25–30 May 2018	Mediana/Delo	584	**22.9%**	8.2%	6.7%	6.8%	6.6%	6.0%	3.9%	5.1%	3.9%	3.4%	–		–	–	7.0%	–	19.5%	–	14.7%
29 May 2018	Ninamedia/Dnevnik/Večer	900	**25.5%**	13.7%	12.5%	8.8%	6.6%	8.3%	3.9%	8.1%	2.6%	2.4%	–		–	–	7.6%	–	–	–	11.8%
25–29 May 2018	Parsifal/Nova24TV	1061	**18.1%**	9.3%	5.0%	4.7%	3.8%	4.6%	1.0%	3.9%	3.0%	2.2%	–		–	–	7.6%	6.7%	21.5%	10.0%	8.8%
23–29 May 2018	Mediana/SiOL/Planet TV	1094	**16.5%**	8.9%	5.4%	4.0%	5.7%	4.3%	2.8%	4.2%	3.8%	2.0%	0.1%		–	–	0.3%	10.5%	23.4%	–	11.8%
25–27 May 2018	Valicon	770	**13.8%**	11.0%	9.5%	4.4%	7.8%	4.5%	2.6%	3.8%	4.0%	2.2%	0.5%		–	–	–	13.1%	7.0%	–	2.8%
25 May 2018	Mediana/RTVSLO	1123	**15.0%**	10.3%	4.8%	4.3%	4.1%	3.6%	3.0%	4.2%	3.4%	2.0%	0.4%		–	–	9.5%	10.8%	22.8%	–	4.7%
22–25 May 2018	Parsifal/Nova24TV	985	**15.6%**	7.7%	5.6%	5.2%	3.6%	5.4%	0.9%	4.5%	3.5%	2.8%	1.9%		–	–	1.3%	8.5%	23.1%	7.6%	7.9%
21–23 May 2018	Ninamedia/Dnevnik/Večer	900	**15.6%**	9.5%	8.4%	5.5%	4.6%	3.9%	1.0%	4.9%	1.5%	1.2%	0.1%		–	–	–	–	41.0%	–	5.1%
22 May 2018	Episcenter	747	**25.6%**	14.7%	16.1%	5.6%	8.5%	8.2%	2.8%	4.9%	2.1%	2.8%	–		–	–	–	–	–	–	9.5%
21–22 May 2018	Ninamedia/Mladina	600	**18.9%**	10.2%	11.2%	7.3%	5.4%	4.8%	–	6.6%	–	–	–		–	–	–	–	25.7%	–	7.7%
12–22 May 2018	Mediana/SiOL/Planet TV	1050	**14.7%**	9.8%	4.9%	4.7%	4.0%	3.8%	3.1%	3.7%	3.0%	1.9%	0.3%		–	–	0.3%	11.7%	23.4%	–	5.1%
20 May 2018	Mediana/POPTV	743	**14.9%**	9.7%	6.5%	4.5%	4.5%	3.3%	3.1%	3.9%	3.1%	1.7%	–		–	–	–	10.1%	21.8%	–	5.2%
11–17 May 2018	Mediana/RTVSLO	764	**15.4%**	10.6%	6.5%	4.6%	4.8%	3.3%	2.8%	3.4%	2.8%	2.0%	0.3%		–	–	–	9.2%	22.1%	–	4.8%
14–17 May 2018	Parsifal/Nova24TV	719	**17.2%**	12.2%	6.8%	4.3%	2.7%	3.0%	1.3%	3.2%	2.5%	1.4%	1.3%		–	–	2.4%	8.1%	26.9%	6.4%	5.0%
11–17 May 2018	Mediana/RTVSLO	764	**15.4%**	10.6%	6.5%	4.6%	4.8%	3.3%	2.8%	3.4%	2.8%	2.0%	0.3%		–	–	7.8%	9.2%	22.1%	–	4.8%
9–15 May 2018	Mediana/SiOL/Planet TV	750	**15.5%**	8.6%	6.8%	4.8%	4.4%	2.4%	3.1%	4.0%	2.9%	1.7%	0.4%		–	–	0.6%	8.7%	25.2%	–	6.9%
3–10 May 2018	Mediana/RTVSLO	712	**15.7%**	10.3%	7.2%	4.2%	5.5%	3.3%	2.9%	3.8%	2.2%	2.2%	0.3%		–	–	–	5.0%	23.6%	–	5.4%
7–10 May 2018	Ninamedia/Dnevnik/Večer	1000	**19.6%**	11.9%	11.5%	6.7%	5.0%	5.7%	1.5%	4.8%	1.3%	1.5%	0.1%		–	–	–	–	24.6%	–	7.7%
8–9 May 2018	Valicon	1024	**12.6%**	12.4%	10.6%	4.9%	6.5%	5.4%	2.3%	3.8%	2.3%	1.6%	2.0%		–	–	5.0%	8.4%	12.1%	–	0.2%
4–7 May 2018	Valicon	6483	**13.6%**	**13.6%**	13.4%	5.8%	6.7%	4.9%	2.8%	4.2%	2.1%	2.0%	1.2%		–	–	4.3%	7.4%	8.9%	–	Tie
2–5 May 2018	Delo Stik/Delo	1008	**17.2%**	15.3%	10.5%	4.7%	6.4%	5.7%	3.0%	3.6%	1.9%	2.2%	0.5%		–	–	7.8%	3.7%	6.4%	7.3%	1.9%
3 May 2018	**Official beginning of the electoral campaign**																				
22 Apr 2018	Mediana/POPTV	711	**13.5%**	13.3%	8.5%	4.4%	4.1%	3.5%	1.7%	2.6%	1.1%	1.4%	0.6%		0.2%	–	–	6.3%	24.6%	7.5%	0.2%
4–22 Apr 2018	Valicon	2187	17.1%	11.5%	**18.0%**	10.8%	8.2%	7.2%	3.5%	5.2%	2.1%	1.9%	1.4%		–	–	–	–	–	–	0.9%
9-11 Apr 2018	Ninamedia/RTVSLO/Dnevnik	700	11.6%	11.9%	**12.2%**	7.0%	5.0%	4.1%	0.2%	4.3%	–	–	–		–	–	4.7%	–	28.8%	10.2%	0.3%
29 Mar-5 Apr 2018	Delo Stik/Delo	1010	12.7%	**15.1%**	12.0%	8.4%	4.9%	6.0%	2.6%	3.2%	–	–	–		–	–	7.6%	1.6%	7.0%	9.4%	2.4%
7 Mar-3 Apr 2018	Valicon	2963	**17.9%**	15.9%	16.8%	8.8%	6.7%	7.8%	2.3%	5.2%	2.1%	2.0%	1.3%		–	–	–	–	–	–	1.1%
25 Mar 2018	Mediana/POPTV	717	10.8%	**14.6%**	8.8%	5.8%	4.2%	3.8%	1.8%	3.3%	1.3%	0.6%	1.0%		0.5%	–	0.5%	9.4%	18.7%	10.8%	3.8%
13–15 Mar 2018	Ninamedia/RTVSLO/Dnevnik	700	11.7%	12.4%	**12.7%**	7.6%	3.6%	4.8%	0.2%	4.9%	–	–	–		–	–	3.2%	–	26.6%	12.2%	0.3%
14 Mar 2018	**Prime minister Miro Cerar announces his resignation**																				
10–14 Mar 2018	SNS	1000	**18.3%**	16.4%	12.9%	4.1%	3.2%	5.3%	1.2%	4.9%	4.1%	2.2%	0.5%		0.7%	–	4.6%	1.2%	12.8%	7.6%	1.9%
1–8 March 2018	Delo Stik/Delo	1010	14.1%	**19.2%**	13.4%	5.9%	4.9%	5.5%	1.6%	3.2%	1.8%	2.5%	–		–	–	5.0%	3.7%	6.5%	9.4%	5.1%
25 Feb 2018	Mediana/POPTV	715	10.6%	**14.6%**	8.5%	5.0%	4.5%	3.6%	1.0%	2.9%	1.1%	1.0%	–		0.5%	–	0.9%	14.1%	21.2%	6.7%	4.0%
20 Feb 2018	**Parties Voice for Children and Families and New People's Party of Slovenia form an electoral alliance, United Right, to jointly contest the upcoming election**																				
13–15 Feb 2018	Ninamedia/RTVSLO/Dnevnik	700	11.8%	**13.0%**	12.6%	5.2%	5.4%	3.9%	–	5.0%	–	–	–	–	–	–	–	–	29.8%	8.6%	0.4%
1–6 Feb 2018	Delo Stik/Delo	1009	11.4%	**19.5%**	13.1%	7.8%	5.5%	5.3%	1.7%	3.5%	1.5%	–	–	–	–	–	5.6%	5.2%	6.3%	10.5%	6.4%
11 Feb 2018	Parsifal/Nova24TV	–	13.2%	**16.6%**	13.4%	4.5%	4.5%	3.4%	1.2%	4.3%	1.0%	1.2%	1.3%	0.5%	–	–	1.1%	12.7%	13.2%	6.9%	3.2%
26 Jan-5 Feb 2018	Valicon	4158	16.9%	15.4%	**20.7%**	7.2%	6.3%	7.1%	2.2%	5.2%	1.5%	2.0%	1.7%		–	–	–	–	–	–	3.8%
28 Jan 2018	Mediana/POPTV	700	8.7%	**12.3%**	8.3%	6.0%	5.4%	3.7%	0.9%	4.6%	1.7%	1.0%	1.0%	0.1%	0.7%	–	1.2%	12.7%	20.3%	8.7%	3.6%
8–11 Jan 2018	Parsifal/Nova24TV	717	**16.1%**	13.9%	14.8%	6.6%	3.5%	1.7%	0.9%	3.4%	3.1%	2.7%	0.8%	0.1%	–	–	1.5%	11.4%	12.9%	6.7%	1.3%
16–18 Jan 2018	Ninamedia/RTVSLO/Dnevnik	700	11.9%	8.8%	**13.7%**	8.3%	5.2%	3.5%	–	5.2%	–	2.8%	–	–	–	–	–	–	31.1%	–	1.8%
3–6 Jan 2018	Delo Stik/Delo	1015	**15.8%**	12.9%	12.1%	8.0%	4.8%	6.5%	1.2%	4.8%	2.6%	–	–	–	–	–	6.8%	4.1%	7.4%	13.0%	2.9%
25 Dec 2017	Mediana/POPTV	709	**10.6%**	8.1%	10.3%	5.4%	5.7%	2.3%	1.9%	4.8%	1.6%	0.8%	1.6%	0.3%	–	–	1.0%	14.0%	19.8%	8.6%	0.3%
12–14 Dec 2017	Ninamedia/RTVSLO/Dnevnik	700	**12.9%**	5.5%	11.9%	8.0%	5.1%	4.2%	–	6.3%	–	–	–	–	–	–	–	–	29.6%	11.5%	1.0%
4–7 Dec 2017	Delo Stik/Delo	1016	12.2%	**15.7%**	12.6%	5.5%	5.3%	6.1%	–	6.4%	–	–	–	–	–	–	–	–	–	–	3.5%
14–16 Nov 2017	Ninamedia/RTVSLO/Dnevnik	700	**13.6%**	3.0%	13.1%	8.1%	5.4%	4.8%	–	5.8%	–	–	–	–	–	–	–	–	28.3%	11.6%	0.5%
11 Nov 2017	Mediana/POPTV	700	**13.9%**	–	11.8%	5.2%	4.7%	4.5%	1.1%	5.8%	2.5%	2.8%	1.2%	0.6%	1.4%	–	1.3%	16.2%	20.8%	6.5%	2.1%
6–8 Nov 2017	Parsifal/Nova24TV	792	**15.8%**	–	11.2%	4.9%	3.3%	1.7%	0.2%	3.6%	2.5%	2.4%	2.1%	1.3%	–	–	2.7%	17.2%	28.2%	1.9%	4.6%
2–8 Nov 2017	Episcenter/Delo	1010	13.8%	–	**19.8%**	7.0%	7.5%	7.1%	–	4.3%	–	–	–	–	–	–	–	–	–	–	6.0%
28 Sep-5 Oct 2017	Delo Stik/Delo	1020	15.0%	–	**16.4%**	11.9%	6.7%	7.1%	–	5.5%	1.4%	2.0%	2.1%	–	–	–	–	–	–	–	1.4%
2–6 Oct 2017	Parsifal/Nova24TV	722	**15.6%**	–	10.3%	6.5%	3.3%	6.7%	0.3%	4.4%	2.8%	2.3%	2.1%	0.3%	–	–	1.0%	18.1%	21.5%	4.1%	5.3%
23 Sep 2017	Mediana/POPTV	712	**12.5%**	–	7.3%	6.3%	4.7%	4.5%	–	3.3%	0.7%	2.3%	0.5%	0.2%	0.5%	–	2.0%	18.2%	29.0%	7.9%	5.2%
12–14 Sep 2017	Ninamedia/RTVSLO/Dnevnik	700	**14.2%**	–	13.0%	10.1%	6.3%	5.5%	–	4.5%	–	–	–	–	–	–	–	–	32.8%	8.5%	1.2%
11–13 Sep 2017	Parsifal/Nova24TV	700	**14.3%**	–	11.8%	6.9%	8.5%	6.3%	0.8%	7.1%	2.5%	3.9%	1.7%	0.5%	–	–	0.4%	18.2%	12.3%	2.6%	2.5%
31 Aug-7 Sep 2017	Delo Stik/Delo	1009	**18.6%**	–	12.5%	9.0%	7.7%	7.3%	–	5.0%	–	2.8%	1.7%	–	–	–	9.7%	6.2%	6.7%	10.9%	6.1%
26 Aug 2017	Mediana/POPTV	710	**13.1%**	–	7.3%	5.1%	4.9%	4.1%	0.2%	3.0%	1.1%	1.4%	1.2%	0.8%	0.7%	–	0.8%	19.7%	28.4%	8.2%	5.8%
9-11 Aug 2017	Parsifal/Nova24TV	725	**16.8%**	–	10.8%	6.5%	4.8%	7.6%	0.9%	6.1%	4.0%	3.0%	2.2%	1.2%	–	–	0.4%	12.3%	18.2%	3.2%	6.0%
7–9 Aug 2017	Ninamedia/RTVSLO/Dnevnik	700	**13.5%**	–	11.5%	10.2%	7.2%	6.1%	–	5.1%	–	–	–	–	–	–	–	–	29.2%	12.9%	2.0%
27 Jul-2 Aug 2017	Delo Stik/Delo	1005	**15.3%**	–	10.3%	9.3%	7.3%	5.3%	–	4.9%	3.7%	2.6%	3.4%	–	–	–	11.1%	7.4%	6.1%	13.3%	5.0%
21 Jul 2017	Mediana/POPTV	708	**13.4%**	–	5.3%	7.4%	3.9%	3.6%	0.1%	3.6%	2.4%	1.1%	1.5%	0.2%	–	–	1.9%	19.8%	28.0%	8.0%	6.0%
11–13 Jul 2017	Ninamedia/RTVSLO/Dnevnik	700	**13.0%**	–	11.2%	8.8%	8.5%	5.2%	2.2%	5.4%	–	–	–	–	–	–	–	–	23.4%	17.8%	1.8%
4–6 Jul 2017	Parsifal/Nova24TV	620	**12.8%**	–	9.2%	8.5%	7.1%	2.8%	0.8%	2.1%	1.0%	1.7%	0.7%	0.4%	–	–	0.7%	22.8%	19.5%	9.9%	3.6%
30 Jun-6 Jul 2017	Delo Stik/Delo	1000	**15.5%**	–	13.1%	10.4%	8.9%	8.4%	–	4.7%	3.7%	1.5%	2.9%	–	–	–	9.2%	6.7%	6.9%	8.1%	2.4%
25 Jun 2017	Mediana/POPTV		**11.6%**	–	5.3%	4.3%	4.6%	3.8%	1.1%	3.8%	1.3%	1.8%	0.8%	0.1%	0.6%	–	0.9%	24.0%	27.4%	8.7%	6.3%
24 Jun 2017	**United Left electoral alliance dissolved, alliance partners IDS and TRS merge to form The Left**																				
13–15 Jun 2017	Ninamedia/RTVSLO/Dnevnik	700	**14.9%**	–	11.9%	9.8%	7.8%	5.5%	–	6.4%	–	–	–	–	–	–	–	–	28.5%	11.0%	3.0%
30 May-2 Jun 2017	Parsifal/Nova24TV	606	**14.8%**	–	6.4%	5.3%	4.2%	4.8%	0.6%	4.8%	2.2%	0.5%	1.7%	0.7%	–	–	1.4%	27.8%	19.6%	5.1%	8.4%
30 May-2 Jun 2017	Delo Stik/Delo	1000	**17.9%**	–	13.6%	5.4%	8.6%	9.7%	–	3.5%	2.0%	2.6%	3.0%	–	–	–	8.9%	5.9%	7.9%	11.0%	4.3%
28 May 2017	Mediana/POPTV	709	**12.7%**	–	9.4%	5.1%	3.8%	2.3%	–	2.7%	–	–	3.0%	–	–	–	–	18.6%	25.9%	10.5%	3.3%
9-11 May 2017	Ninamedia/RTVSLO/Dnevnik	700	**14.1%**	–	12.9%	8.1%	7.9%	5.2%	–	5.5%	–	–	–	–	–	–	–	–	28.5%	11.0%	1.2%
9–12 May 2017	Parsifal/Nova24TV	609	**17.6%**	–	7.8%	4.4%	5.2%	1.8%	0.2%	2.4%	–	2.6%	1.4%	1.9%	–	–	1.4%	29.0%	17.1%	4.8%	9.8%
26 Apr-5 May 2017	Delo Stik/Delo	1010	**13.8%**	–	12.8%	7.3%	9.2%	5.9%	–	5.8%	4.1%	3.0%	2.3%	–	–	–	7.0%	8.8%	8.4%	11.6%	1.0%
21 Apr 2017	Mediana/POPTV	708	**12.3%**	–	6.6%	4.1%	5.1%	5.8%	0.2%	3.6%	2.4%	1.6%	2.7%	0.9%	0.8%	–	2.2%	20.4%	21.5%	9.9%	5.7%
18–20 Apr 2017	Ninamedia/RTVSLO/Dnevnik	700	**13.9%**	–	10.2%	7.9%	6.5%	5.6%	0.2%	6.8%	–	–	–	–	–	–	2.6%	–	29.0%	17.3%	3.7%
10–13 Apr 2017	Parsifal/Nova24TV	619	**17.6%**	–	11.1%	8.8%	5.5%	1.6%	1.9%	2.6%	4.0%	3.7%	3.8%	0.6%	–	–	0.4%	11.1%	21.1%	6.2%	9.2%
30 Mar-5 Apr 2017	Delo Stik/Delo	1002	**14.2%**	–	10.3%	7.7%	8.5%	4.9%	–	5.6%	2.4%	1.8%	3.4%	–	–	–	8.6%	9.8%	8.2%	14.6%	3.9%
24 Mar 2017	Mediana/POPTV		**11.9%**	–	6.8%	6.4%	3.4%	3.0%	0.7%	4.0%	1.6%	1.4%	–	–	1.3%	–	1.8%	22.1%	26.5%	9.1%	5.1%
14–16 Mar 2017	Ninamedia/RTVSLO/Dnevnik	700	**14.0%**	–	10.8%	6.3%	5.8%	5.0%	–	6.5%	–	–	–	–	–	–	–	–	31.4%	16.8%	3.2%
7–9 Mar 2017	Parsifal/Nova24TV	608	**13.1%**	–	5.1%	7.1%	3.5%	3.4%	0.5%	4.2%	1.8%	2.4%	0.9%	2.1%	–	–	0.6%	27.1%	21.9%	6.3%	6.0%
23 Feb-2 Mar 2017	Delo Stik/Delo	1002	**12.9%**	–	11.4%	6.7%	7.9%	6.8%	0.7%	5.5%	2.7%	3.5%	–	–	–	–	7.4%	9.3%	9.2%	16.0%	1.5%
24 Feb 2017	Mediana/POPTV	708	**10.3%**	–	4.5%	5.1%	3.1%	2.8%	–	4.8%	0.5%	1.4%	–	–	0.8%	–	0.7%	26.6%	30.6%	9.0%	5.2%
14–16 Feb 2017	Ninamedia/RTVSLO/Dnevnik	700	**12.9%**	–	9.6%	9.7%	6.0%	5.6%	–	5.0%	–	2.1%	–	–	–	–	–	–	33.2%	15.1%	3.2%
6–9 Feb 2017	Parsifal/Nova24TV	614	**13.7%**	–	9.0%	7.6%	5.5%	5.2%	1.2%	3.5%	4.3%	3.7%	2.4%	1.2%	–	–	0.2%	21.1%	17.8%	3.7%	5.7%
30 Jan-3 Feb 2017	Delo Stik/Delo	1000	**13.2%**	–	9.4%	10.5%	8.2%	4.9%	0.4%	5.2%	2.5%	2.3%	–	–	2.5%	–	9.4%	11.9%	11.0%	11.1%	2.7%
22 Jan 2017	Mediana/POPTV	715	**11.1%**	–	2.8%	6.5%	2.8%	2.7%	0.8%	3.5%	0.9%	2.8%	–	–	0.9%	–	2.1%	24.1%	30.0%	9.1%	5.4%
10–12 Jan 2017	Ninamedia/RTVSLO/Dnevnik	700	**12.7%**	–	10.3%	10.6%	7.0%	6.4%	–	4.5%	–	–	–	–	–	–	–	–	30.3%	14.4%	2.1%
29 Dec 2016-4 Jan 2017	Delo Stik/Delo	1021	**14.3%**	–	10.9%	11.0%	6.7%	5.1%	0.2%	2.4%	2.2%	2.0%	–	–	–	–	5.4%	9.7%	18.1%	12.0%	3.3%
8 Jan 2017	Parsifal/Nova24TV	610	**16.3%**	–	8.8%	7.0%	4.2%	5.1%	1.5%	3.9%	2.4%	3.8%	3.8%	1.1%	–	–	0.5%	16.2%	17.6%	7.8%	7.5%
23 Dec 2016	Mediana/POPTV	715	**12.3%**	–	5.8%	5.1%	3.6%	3.7%	0.3%	5.7%	0.2%	1.9%	–	–	0.2%	–	1.4%	28.5%	19.6%	11.8%	6.5%
13–15 Dec 2016	Ninamedia/RTVSLO/Dnevnik	700	**14.0%**	–	11.2%	10.3%	7.2%	6.2%	–	4.8%	–	–	–	–	–	–	–	–	25.2%	18.1%	3.7%
30 Nov-2 Dec 2016	Parsifal/Nova24TV	614	**12.5%**	–	7.4%	8.5%	4.7%	6.2%	0.9%	3.5%	1.7%	4.3%	1.4%	2.3%	–	–	1.1%	18.9%	17.6%	8.9%	4.0%
28 Nov-2 Dec 2016	Delo Stik/Delo	1001	**15.9%**	–	8.6%	9.0%	8.4%	6.0%	0.5%	3.3%	1.7%	1.9%	1.8%	–	–	–	5.6%	11.4%	13.6%	14.1%	6.9%
27 Nov 2016	Mediana/POPTV	718	**15.0%**	–	4.8%	7.5%	2.5%	4.9%	0.7%	3.2%	0.7%	1.4%	–	–	0.4%	–	0.9%	24.6%	26.2%	7.1%	7.5%
8–10 Nov 2016	Ninamedia/RTVSLO/Dnevnik	700	**14.1%**	–	12.5%	10.4%	7.0%	6.2%	0.4%	5.0%	–	2.7%	–	–	–	–	1.4%	–	20.9%	19.4%	1.6%
27 Oct-3 Nov 2016	Delo Stik/Delo	1000	**12.5%**	–	9.2%	9.5%	6.6%	4.8%	0.7%	3.6%	1.4%	1.9%	1.3%	–	–	–	5.6%	14.8%	14.3%	15.1%	3.0%
29 Oct 2016	Parsifal/Nova24TV	603	**12.2%**	–	6.0%	3.1%	3.0%	3.2%	0.6%	6.3%	0.9%	1.7%	2.2%	1.0%	–	–	0.7%	26.0%	21.2%	11.8%	5.9%
23 Oct 2016	Mediana/POPTV	707	**12.7%**	–	7.7%	6.2%	3.2%	4.8%	–	2.9%	–	1.3%	–	–	–	–	–	19.0%	26.9%	11.8%	5.0%
11–13 Oct 2016	Ninamedia/RTVSLO/Dnevnik	700	**13.8%**	–	12.0%	10.1%	7.9%	6.3%	0.9%	4.1%	–	1.6%	–	–	–	–	0.2%	–	22.8%	20.3%	1.8%
29 Sep-3 Oct 2016	Delo Stik/Delo	1001	**13.3%**	–	9.1%	9.4%	6.3%	5.0%	0.5%	2.5%	1.9%	2.9%	–	–	–	–	3.6%	13.1%	16.8%	15.6%	3.9%
25 Sep 2016	Mediana/POPTV	712	**13.0%**	–	5.0%	4.8%	2.0%	3.4%	–	4.1%	–	1.4%	–	–	–	–	–	23.9%	28.7%	10.9%	8.0%
13–15 Sep 2016	Ninamedia/RTVSLO/Dnevnik	700	13.0%	–	11.1%	**14.1%**	8.1%	5.2%	–	4.4%	–	2.9%	–	–	–	–	3.6%	–	26.1%	11.4%	1.1%
5–8 Sep 2016	Delo Stik/Delo	1005	**13.0%**	–	10.1%	10.0%	6.6%	6.6%	0.4%	2.4%	2.7%	2.7%	1.0%	–	1.3%	–	2.9%	11.1%	17.2%	13.0%	2.9%
28 Aug 2016	Mediana/POPTV	710	**10.4%**	–	6.4%	4.2%	2.4%	1.9%	–	3.9%	–	2.3%	–	–	–	–	–	23.6%	30.3%	12.6%	4.0%
16–18 Aug 2016	Ninamedia/RTVSLO/Dnevnik	700	11.3%	–	**12.1%**	9.3%	6.9%	6.8%	0.3%	3.1%	–	2.1%	–	–	–	–	2.1%	–	29.4%	16.6%	0.8%
26 Jul-2 Aug 2016	Delo Stik/Delo	600	**10.9%**	–	7.4%	8.3%	4.5%	3.2%	0.7%	2.0%	1.0%	1.2%	–	–	–	–	0.6%	15.0%	28.0%	17.2%	2.6%
22 Jul 2016	Mediana/POPTV	708	**12.3%**	–	5.8%	5.1%	3.6%	3.7%	–	5.7%	–	1.9%	–	–	–	–	–	28.5%	19.6%	11.8%	6.5%
12–14 Jul 2016	Ninamedia/RTVSLO	700	**14.1%**	–	10.1%	10.9%	6.7%	4.8%	0.2%	4.6%	–	1.6%	–	–	–	–	1.0%	–	27.6%	18.4%	3.2%
30 Jun-7 Jul 2016	Delo Stik/Delo	600	**10.5%**	–	8.6%	3.7%	4.6%	4.8%	0.1%	1.4%	2.6%	3.1%	–	–	0.4%	–	1.5%	16.7%	25.4%	16.6%	1.9%
26 Jun 2016	Mediana/POPTV	705	**9.1%**	–	7.7%	4.8%	3.5%	4.4%	–	4.2%	–	2.0%	–	–	–	–	–	14.5%	22.3%	23.4%	1.4%
14–15 Jun 2016	Ninamedia/RTVSLO/Dnevnik	700	**14.3%**	–	8.9%	8.4%	8.1%	5.3%	0.8%	3.5%	–	0.5%	–	–	–	–	1.3%	–	28.3%	23.6%	5.4%
30 May-2 Jun 2016	Delo Stik/Delo	500	**7.3%**	–	4.1%	3.4%	6.7%	1.6%	0.9%	1.9%	1.0%	0.8%	–	–	0.1%	–	0.9%	14.3%	34.1%	22.9%	0.6%
22 May 2016	Mediana/POPTV	708	**13.0%**	–	4.4%	4.6%	4.5%	3.7%	–	3.1%	–	2.0%	–	–	–	–	–	19.4%	27.9%	12.7%	8.4%
17–19 May 2016	Ninamedia/RTVSLO/Dnevnik	700	**12.4%**	–	10.9%	9.4%	8.0%	4.3%	0.1%	3.4%	–	1.6%	–	–	–	–	1.8%	–	24.2%	23.6%	1.5%
3–6 May 2016	Delo Stik/Delo	500	**11.0%**	–	4.9%	7.2%	5.3%	2.2%	–	2.2%	0.5%	1.7%	–	–	0.3%	–	1.0%	16.7%	27.0%	20.0%	3.8%
23 Apr 2016	Mediana/POPTV	718	**13.5%**	–	5.5%	6.5%	3.7%	4.7%	–	3.1%	–	1.7%	–	–	–	–	–	22.6%	22.7%	10.9%	7.0%
12–14 Apr 2016	Ninamedia/RTVSLO/Dnevnik	700	**16.6%**	–	10.4%	10.0%	6.5%	5.7%	–	4.6%	–	1.6%	–	–	–	–	1.4%	–	27.3%	16.1%	6.2%
1–7 Apr 2016	Delo Stik/Delo	600	**11.7%**	–	5.7%	7.4%	7.3%	2.2%	–	3.1%	0.4%	1.4%	–	–	1.0%	–	0.3%	17.2%	28.0%	17.2%	4.3%
27 Mar 2016	Mediana/POPTV	713	**11.8%**	–	6.2%	7.0%	5.1%	3.6%	–	5.3%	–	2.4%	–	–	–	–	–	23.0%	19.6%	10.2%	4.8%
15–17 Mar 2016	Ninamedia/RTVSLO/Dnevnik	700	**16.8%**	–	10.8%	9.8%	8.7%	4.1%	0.2%	3.5%	1.3%	0.5%	–	–	–	–	1.0%	–	24.0%	19.3%	6.0%
29 Feb-1 Mar 2016	Delo Stik/Delo	600	**12.8%**	–	4.3%	7.9%	6.8%	3.1%	–	2.1%	1.1%	1.3%	–	–	1.1%	–	1.0%	13.0%	27.4%	18.1%	4.9%
28 Feb 2016	Mediana/POPTV	710	**13.4%**	–	3.1%	8.6%	3.8%	4.4%	–	2.5%	–	1.6%	–	–	–	–	–	22.1%	25.0%	11.4%	4.8%
16–18 Feb 2016	Ninamedia/RTVSLO/Dnevnik	700	**21.4%**	–	8.3%	8.5%	5.3%	3.2%	0.2%	3.8%	–	1.6%	–	–	–	–	3.3%	–	25.4%	18.9%	12.9%
1–4 Feb 2016	Delo Stik/Delo	600	**12.3%**	–	4.0%	9.0%	5.2%	2.6%	0.1%	2.4%	0.5%	0.9%	–	–	0.6%	–	1.1%	14.8%	32.3%	14.2%	3.3%
24 Jan 2016	Mediana/POPTV	713	**14.2%**	–	6.4%	6.5%	5.4%	4.1%	–	2.8%	–	2.2%	–	–	–	–	–	22.5%	20.5%	10.8%	7.7%
11–18 Jan 2016	Ninamedia/RTVSLO/Dnevnik	700	**17.8%**	–	8.5%	11.5%	6.6%	5.3%	0.3%	4.8%	–	1.3%	–	–	–	–	1.4%	–	27.4%	15.0%	6.3%
4–7 Jan 2016	Delo Stik/Delo	600	**12.0%**	–	6.4%	10.3%	8.6%	2.1%	0.2%	1.7%	0.3%	1.3%	–	–	0.2%	–	1.2%	14.0%	29.6%	12.1%	1.7%
27 Dec 2015	Mediana/POPTV	702	**14.2%**	–	5.7%	8.9%	4.1%	4.2%	–	4.8%	–	2.3%	–	–	–	–	–	20.5%	20.7%	8.5%	5.3%
14–17 Dec 2015	Ninamedia/RTVSLO/Dnevnik	700	**15.8%**	–	8.5%	10.4%	6.1%	4.9%	0.1%	2.7%	1.1%	1.1%	–	–	–	–	0.6%	–	25.3%	23.4%	5.4%
7–10 Dec 2015	Delo Stik/Delo	600	**13.0%**	–	7.1%	7.6%	5.1%	3.1%	–	2.6%	1.8%	1.5%	–	–	–	–	1.1%	17.1%	27.1%	12.9%	5.4%
6 Dec 2015	Parsifal/nova24TV	408	**15.3%**	–	4.9%	9.4%	3.9%	4.7%	0.8%	1.5%	1.6%	2.9%	–	–	–	–	1.4%	21.8%	27.4%	4.6%	5.9%
22 Nov 2015	Mediana/POPTV	707	**12.2%**	–	6.3%	8.6%	3.6%	3.4%	–	4.4%	–	–	–	–	2.5%	–	–	21.7%	22.5%	12.8%	3.6%
16–19 Nov 2015	Ninamedia/RTVSLO/Dnevnik	700	**14.4%**	–	8.3%	**14.4%**	6.2%	3.9%	0.4%	4.1%	1.8%	2.8%	–	–	–	–	1.3%	–	23.9%	18.6%	Tie
2–5 Nov 2015	Delo Stik/Delo	600	**13.1%**	–	4.5%	11.5%	6.8%	2.2%	0.3%	2.2%	1.7%	1.6%	–	–	–	–	13.6%	0.2%	26.9%	15.4%	1.6%
29–30 Oct 2015	Parsifal/Nova24TV	311	**17.0%**	–	4.1%	7.9%	2.4%	1.1%	0.4%	2.8%	2.6%	1.9%	–	–	–	0.3%	2.3%	27.0%	24.3%	5.8%	8.9%
25 Oct 2015	Mediana/POPTV	712	**13.5%**	–	3.6%	9.1%	3.9%	5.4%	–	3.1%	–	3.5%	–	–	–	–	–	17.4%	25.7%	11.5%	4.4%
13–14 Oct 2015	Ninamedia/RTVSLO/Dnevnik	700	15.9%	–	8.5%	**16.3%**	7.4%	4.5%	0.2%	5.9%	0.4%	1.4%	–	–	–	–	0.5%	–	21.7%	17.4%	0.4%
1–7 Oct 2015	Delo Stik/Delo	600	8.5%	–	5.4%	**10.6%**	5.9%	3.6%	0.1%	3.1%	1.8%	0.8%	–	–	0.2%	–	0.8%	13.8%	32.8%	12.6%	2.1%
27 Sep 2015	Mediana/POPTV	708	**13.3%**	–	5.4%	12.6%	5.2%	2.3%	–	3.5%	–	2.8%	–	–	–	–	–	19.2%	20.2%	11.7%	0.7%
9–10 Sep 2015	Ninamedia/RTVSLO/Dnevnik	700	14.1%	–	6.3%	**15.4%**	6.2%	4.2%	–	5.1%	0.6%	2.3%	–	–	–	–	1.2%	–	25.7%	18.9%	1.3%
28 Aug-3 Sep 2015	Delo Stik/Delo	600	8.9%	–	3.8%	**13.4%**	6.2%	2.7%	0.2%	1.4%	0.7%	1.1%	–	–	0.3%	0.2%	0.5%	14.5%	34.4%	11.7%	4.5%
23 Aug 2015	Mediana/POPTV	712	**12.5%**	–	8.1%	9.6%	6.3%	4.0%	–	4.0%	–	2.7%	–	–	–	–	–	16.4%	19.3%	11.2%	2.9%
11–13 Aug 2015	Ninamedia/RTVSLO/Dnevnik	700	**15.6%**	–	8.9%	13.1%	8.8%	4.2%	0.6%	5.2%	1.5%	1.3%	–	–	–	–	1.1%	–	21.2%	18.5%	2.5%
30 Jul-6 Aug 2015	Delo Stik/Delo	600	**9.4%**	–	4.2%	9.2%	7.4%	3.3%	0.4%	1.1%	0.8%	1.5%	–	–	0.8%	0.1%	0.5%	19.7%	27.5%	14.1%	0.2%
26 Jul 2015	Mediana/POPTV	722	**11.4%**	–	3.8%	9.4%	7.3%	4.8%	–	4.9%	–	2.8%	–	–	–	–	–	16.1%	20.4%	13.8%	2.0%
13–15 Jul 2015	Ninamedia/RTVSLO/Dnevnik	700	**14.2%**	–	9.5%	11.3%	9.5%	5.4%	0.2%	5.7%	0.7%	1.0%	–	–	–	–	1.4%	–	20.3%	20.8%	2.9%
29 Jun-2 Jul 2015	Delo Stik/Delo	600	**11.7%**	–	4.4%	11.3%	8.4%	2.7%	0.6%	2.4%	0.5%	2.4%	–	–	–	–	0.1%	16.9%	25.8%	12.5%	0.4%
28 Jun 2015	Mediana/POPTV	708	**13.5%**	–	5.2%	11.0%	7.5%	5.6%	–	4.6%	–	2.6%	–	–	–	–	–	11.5%	21.5%	11.4%	2.5%
8–10 Jun 2015	Ninamedia/RTVSLO/Dnevnik	700	**13.2%**	–	8.5%	11.7%	10.9%	4.9%	–	5.0%	1.1%	2.2%	–	–	–	–	0.6%	–	23.4%	18.6%	1.5%
1–5 Jun 2015	Delo Stik/Delo	600	**9.0%**	–	7.0%	7.6%	**9.0%**	4.0%	0.3%	2.6%	2.3%	0.6%	–	–	0.4%	0.2%	0.2%	12.4%	28.6%	15.8%	Tie
24 May 2015	Mediana/POPTV	710	**12.7%**	–	7.9%	12.4%	7.0%	2.7%	–	5.8%	–	4.3%	–	–	–	–	–	14.9%	20.2%	5.9%	0.3%
12–14 May 2015	Ninamedia/RTVSLO/Dnevnik	700	**12.4%**	–	9.2%	11.1%	9.6%	3.5%	0.5%	4.7%	–	2.6%	–	–	–	–	1.1%	–	26.6%	28.6%	1.3%
4–7 May 2015	Delo Stik/Delo	600	**9.4%**	–	7.6%	9.1%	6.7%	4.7%	0.5%	2.6%	0.2%	1.8%	–	–	0.7%	0.1%	0.8%	15.6%	27.1%	13.1%	0.3%
26 Apr 2015	Mediana/POPTV	708	**13.1%**	–	5.7%	11.3%	7.5%	4.1%	–	5.4%	–	2.6%	–	–	–	–	–	14.1%	19.5%	6.0%	1.8%
14–16 Apr 2015	Ninamedia/RTVSLO/Dnevnik	700	12.4%	–	9.6%	**13.3%**	8.1%	6.7%	0.8%	4.3%	0.1%	0.7%	–	–	–	–	0.7%	–	26.3%	16.8%	0.9%
30 Mar-2 Apr 2015	Delo Stik/Delo	600	9.0%	–	6.3%	**10.1%**	7.4%	1.4%	0.6%	3.5%	0.9%	1.2%	–	–	0.6%	–	0.3%	18.9%	21.3%	18.5%	1.1%
22 March 2015	Mediana/POPTV	704	11.3%	–	6.9%	**12.5%**	6.6%	6.2%	–	5.9%	–	3.9%	–	–	–	–	–	14.1%	19.5%	6.0%	1.2%
10–12 Mar 2015	Ninamedia/Dnevnik	700	**16.3%**	–	8.4%	16.2%	7.9%	4.0%	0.2%	5.0%	1.0%	2.6%	–	–	–	–	1.2%	–	20.3%	16.8%	0.1%
2–5 Mar 2015	Delo Stik/Delo	600	11.7%	–	6.3%	**15.2%**	10.3%	4.0%	–	3.0%	0.8%	1.5%	–	–	1.1%	–	0.1%	16.6%	15.8%	12.8%	3.5%
22 Feb 2015	Mediana/POPTV	704	13.5%	–	5.8%	**20.1%**	6.4%	4.0%	–	4.8%	–	2.6%	–	–	–	–	–	15.2%	17.1%	6.8%	6.6%
10–12 Feb 2015	Ninamedia/Dnevnik	700	16.0%	–	7.6%	**17.9%**	7.9%	5.1%	0.7%	3.8%	–	1.8%	–	–	–	–	1.2%	–	20.2%	17.7%	1.9%
2–5 Feb 2015	Delo Stik/Delo	600	14.8%	–	6.3%	**16.8%**	10.3%	3.0%	1.0%	2.9%	0.3%	1.0%	–	–	0.2%	–	0.6%	14.6%	17.7%	14.1%	2.0%
20–21 Jan 2015	Ninamedia/Dnevnik	700	14.6%	–	9.5%	**15.7%**	8.0%	6.4%	0.5%	3.4%	–	2.0%	–	–	–	–	2.3%	–	22.3%	15.3%	1.1%
5–8 Jan 2015	Delo Stik/Delo	600	13.0%	–	6.6%	**15.5%**	8.6%	3.9%	0.3%	2.6%	0.6%	3.3%	–	–	0.6%	0.1%	0.9%	14.6%	11.1%	18.3%	2.5%
15–17 Dec 2014	Slovenski utrip (FUDŠ)	913	**11.4%**	–	5.5%	11.3%	3.8%	2.8%	–	1.6%	–	1.8%	–	–	–	–	2.3%	29.2%	21.2%	7.5%	0.1%
21 Dec 2014	Ninamedia/POPTV/Dnevnik	700	**18.0%**	–	7.5%	14.2%	5.9%	6.3%	1.5%	6.4%	1.3%	1.7%	–	–	–	–	0.9%	–	18.6%	17.7%	3.8%
1–4 Dec 2014	Delo Stik/Delo	600	**13.7%**	–	6.4%	12.4%	8.5%	2.9%	1.1%	3.5%	0.5%	3.9%	–	–	1.5%	0.2%	0.3%	20.9%	10.2%	14.0%	1.3%
18–20 Nov 2014	Ninamedia/POPTV/Dnevnik	700	**14.5%**	–	8.7%	13.8%	8.0%	4.4%	0.7%	5.5%	0.9%	1.5%	–	–	–	–	1.4%	–	22.1%	18.6%	0.7%
17–20 Nov 2014	Slovenski utrip (FUDŠ)	905	**11.3%**	–	4.1%	10.9%	3.7%	4.1%	0.4%	3.4%	0.2%	1.1%	–	–	0.5%	–	6.7%	24.8%	22.1%	6.7%	0.4%
3–5 Nov 2014	Delo Stik/Delo	600	8.8%	–	7.2%	**16.4%**	6.6%	3.7%	0.8%	4.0%	–	2.7%	–	–	–	–	9.6%	12.8%	15.3%	15.6%	3.6%
26 Oct 2014	Ninamedia/POPTV/Dnevnik	700	14.5%	–	10.8%	**18.5%**	5.2%	6.8%	0.5%	8.5%	–	1.5%	–	–	–	–	2.6%	–	15.4%	15.8%	4%
6–9 Oct 2014	Delo Stik/Delo	650	10.9%	–	9.2%	**24.7%**	5.7%	–	1.1%	4.5%	–	3.6%	–	–	–	–	8.9%	9.0%	10.9%	11.0%	13.8%
28 Sep 2014	Ninamedia/POPTV/Dnevnik	700	12.1%	–	9.7%	**23.3%**	7.4%	4.6%	0.9%	6.2%	0.2%	2.8%	–	–	–	–	0.5%	–	18.1%	6.2%	5.2%
8–11 Sep 2014	Delo Stik/Delo	600	8.9%	–	6.6%	**23.3%**	4.8%	6.0%	0.3%	4.5%	–	2.6%	–	–	1.1%	–	4.6%	6.9%	11.8%	18.6%	14.4%
8–11 Sep 2014	Ninamedia/POPTV/Dnevnik	700	15.1%	–	5.6%	**28.1%**	6.4%	5.9%	1.3%	7.5%	1.7%	2.8%	–	–	–	–	1.5%	–	10.4%	13.7%	13%
4–7 Aug 2014	Delo Stik/Delo	603	11.2%	–	5.3%	**28.6%**	7.7%	6.5%	2.0%	3.8%	2.9%	4.2%	–	–	–	–	11.2%	9.5%	7.3%	6.6%	17.7%
**13 Jul 2014**	**Election Results**	**885,860**	**20.7%**	–	**6.0%**	**34.5%**	**6.0%**	**5.6%**	**4.4%**	**10.2%**	**2.2%**	**3.9%**	–	–	**3.0%**	**0.6%**	**2.95%**	–	–	**(48.3%)**	**13.8%**
