= 2018 Slovenian parliamentary election =

- 3 June 2018

All 90 seats in the National Assembly 46 seats needed for a majority
- Turnout: 52.63% (▲1.64pp)
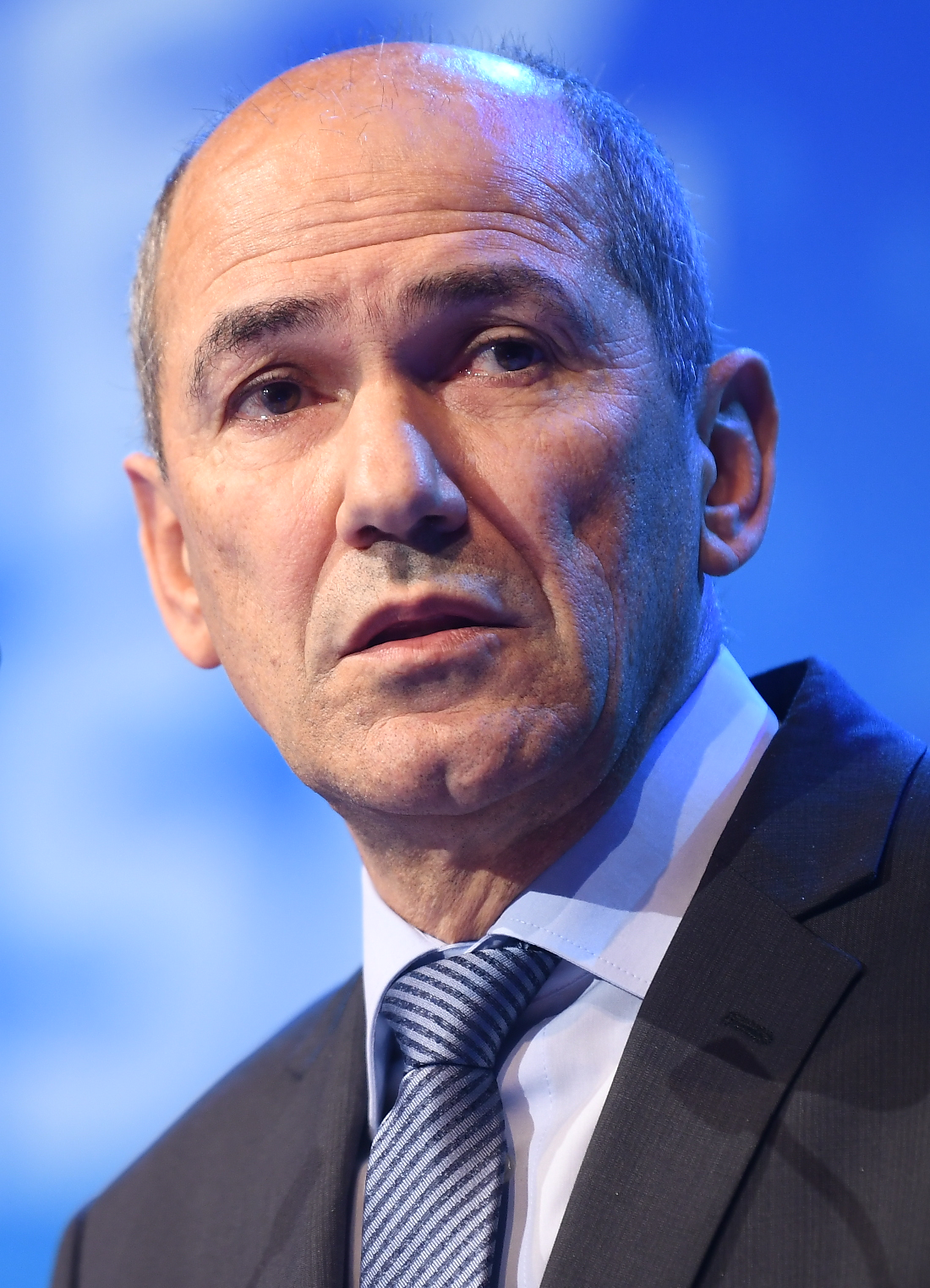

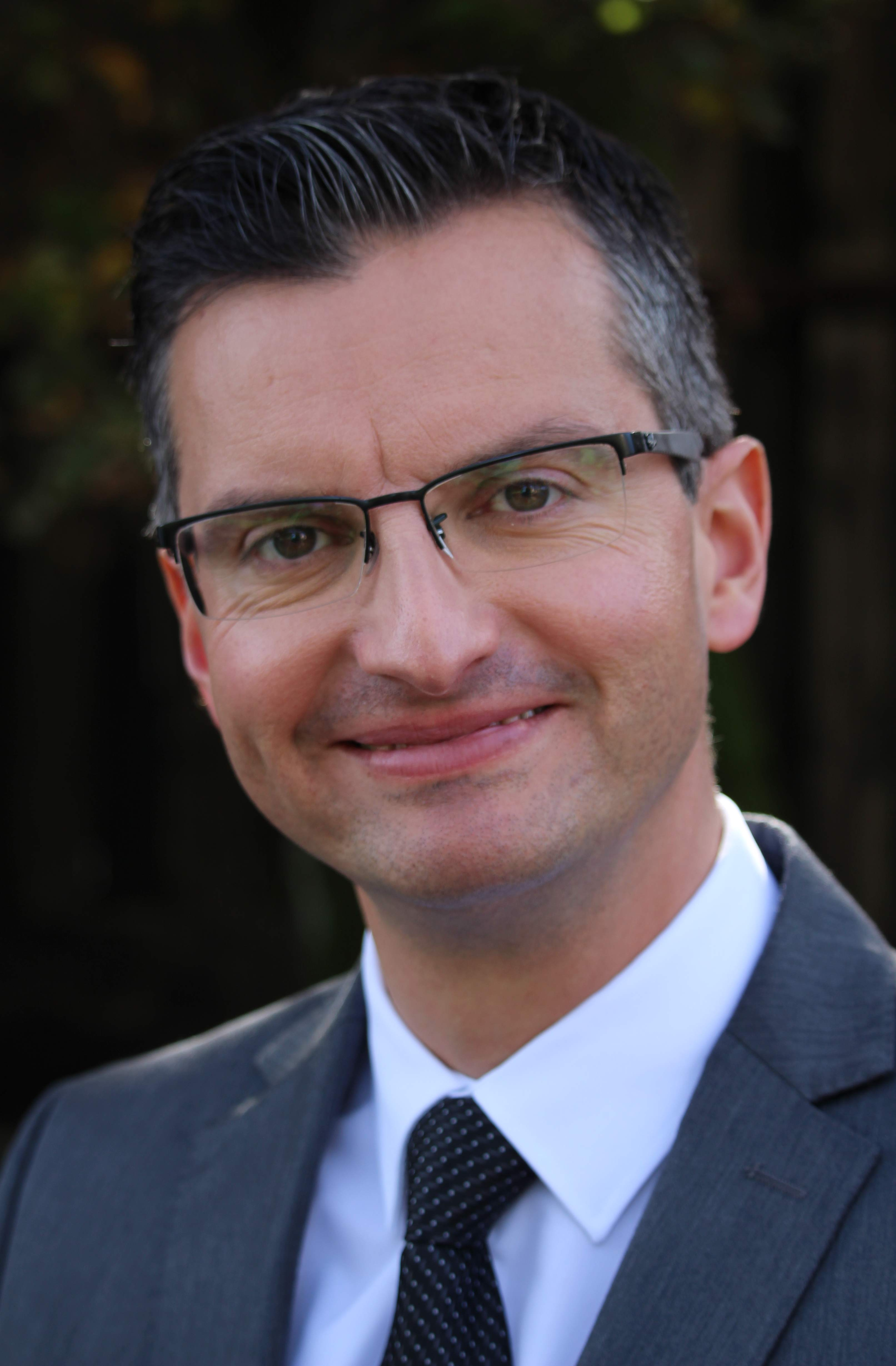

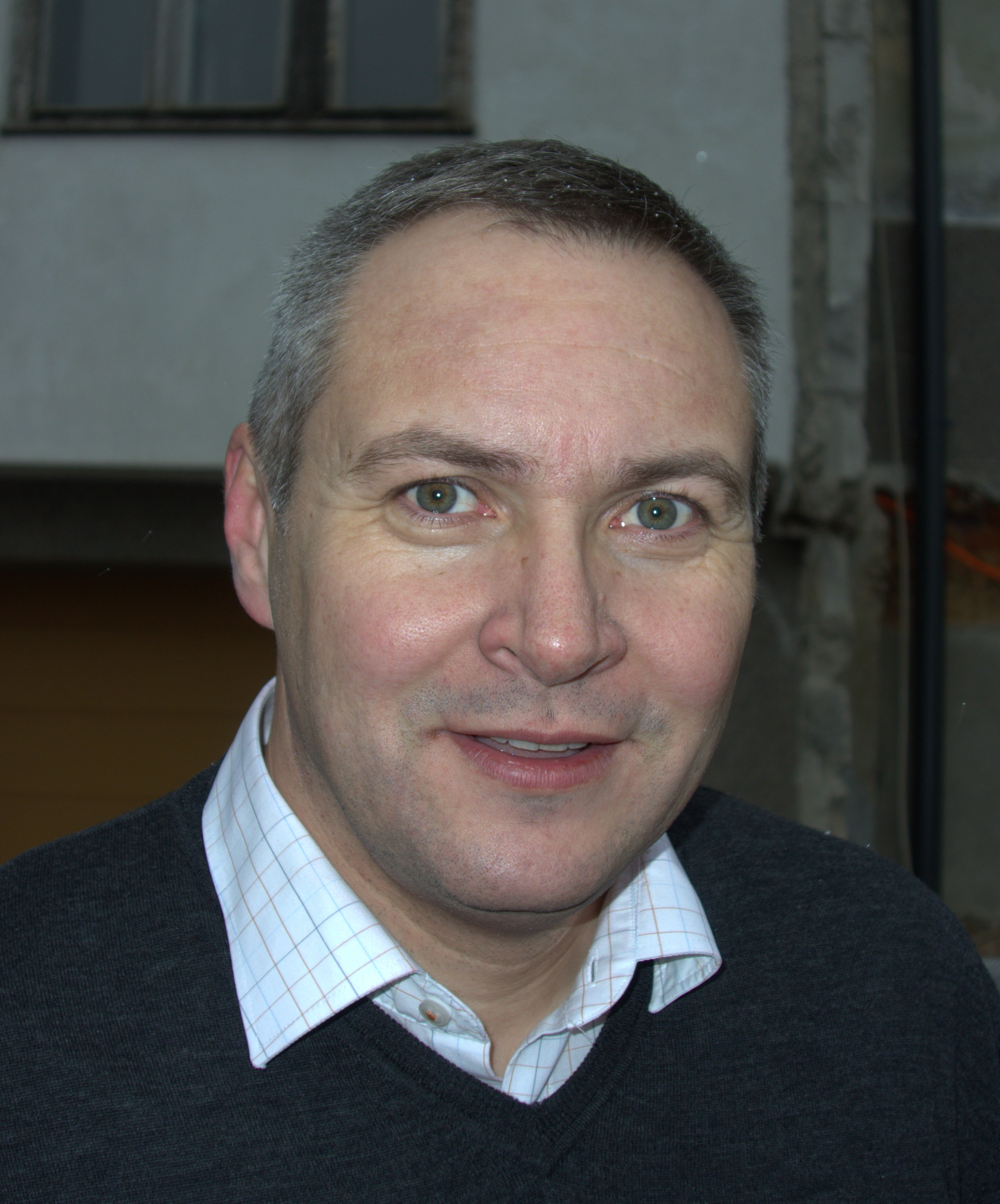

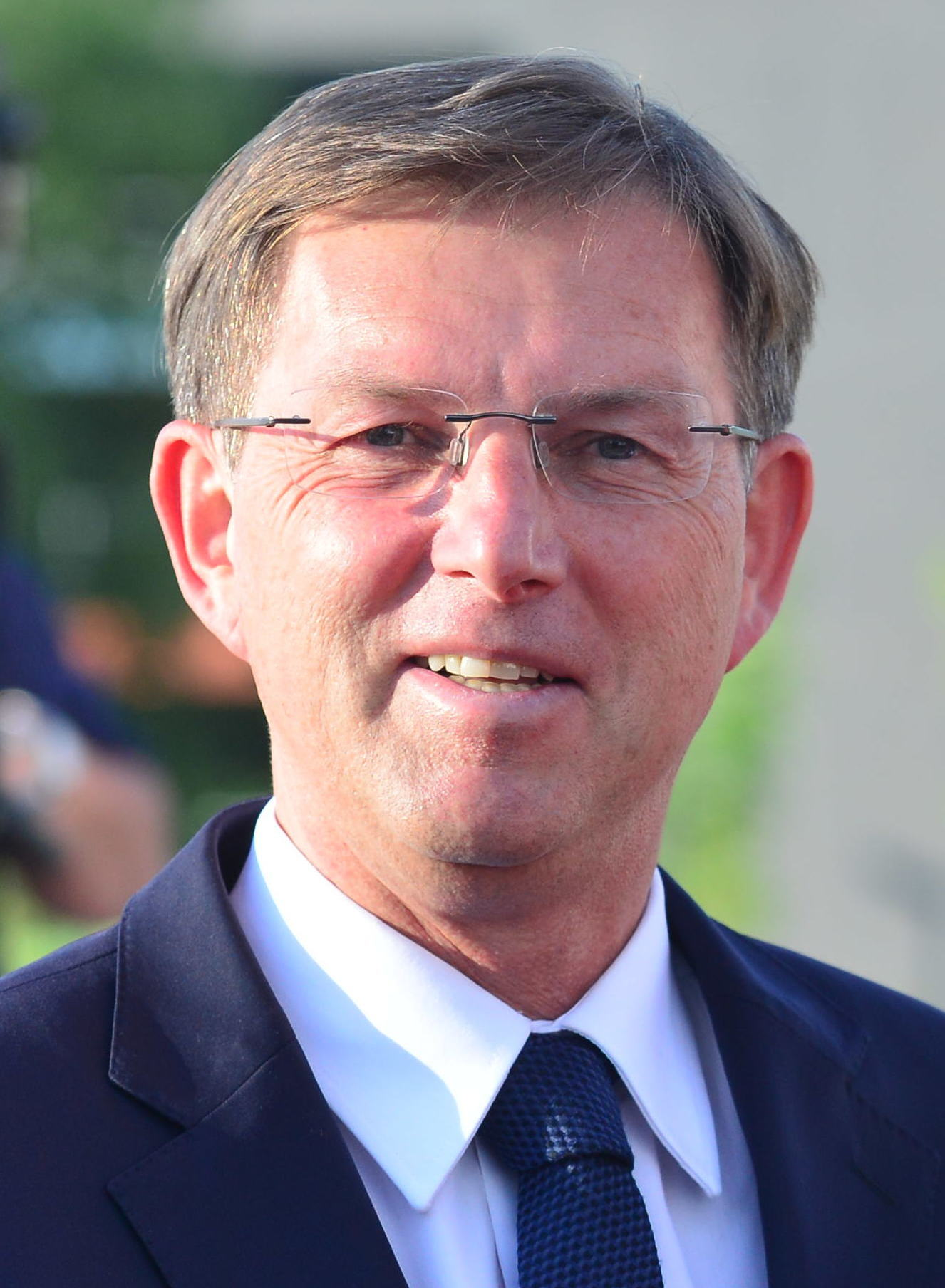

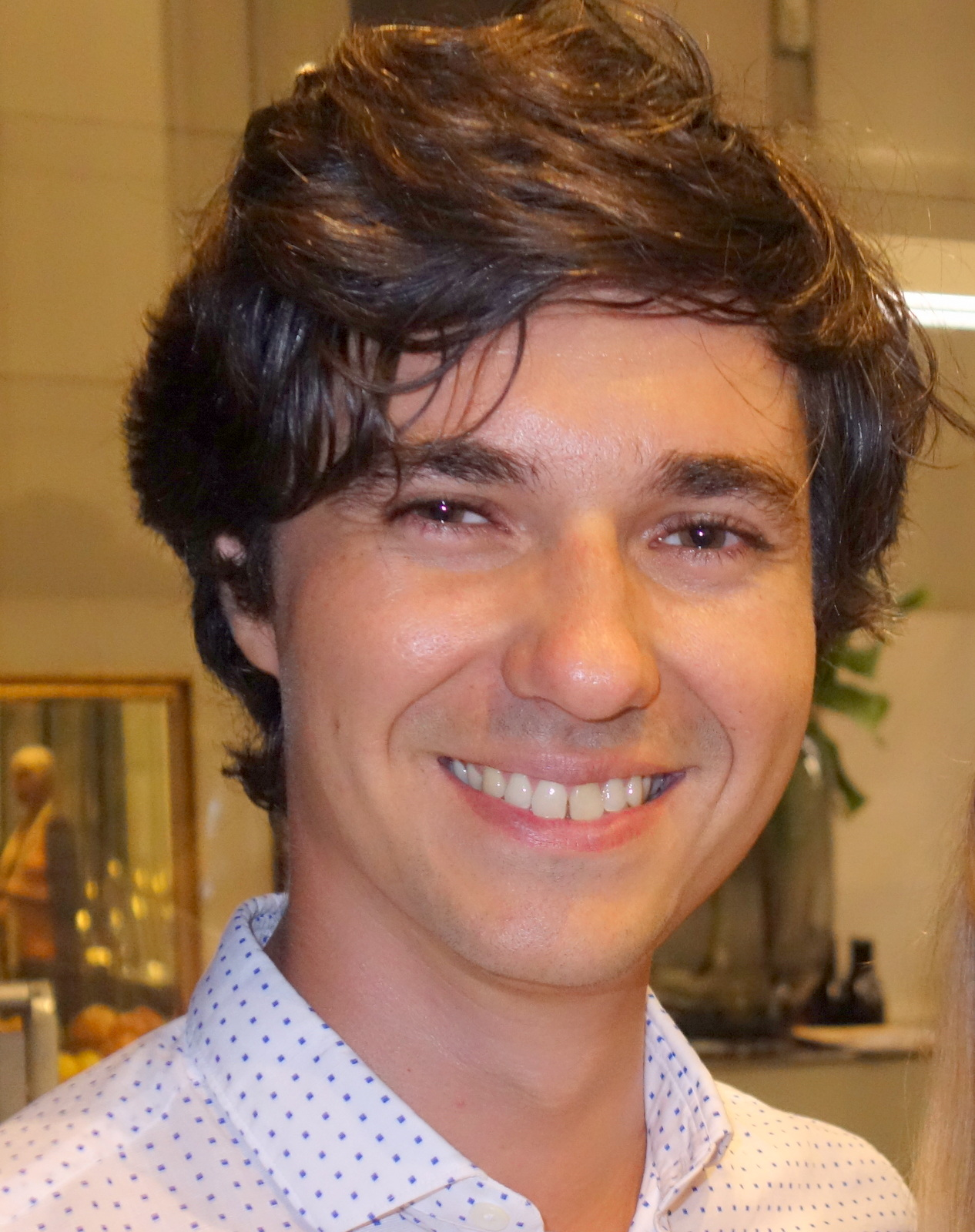

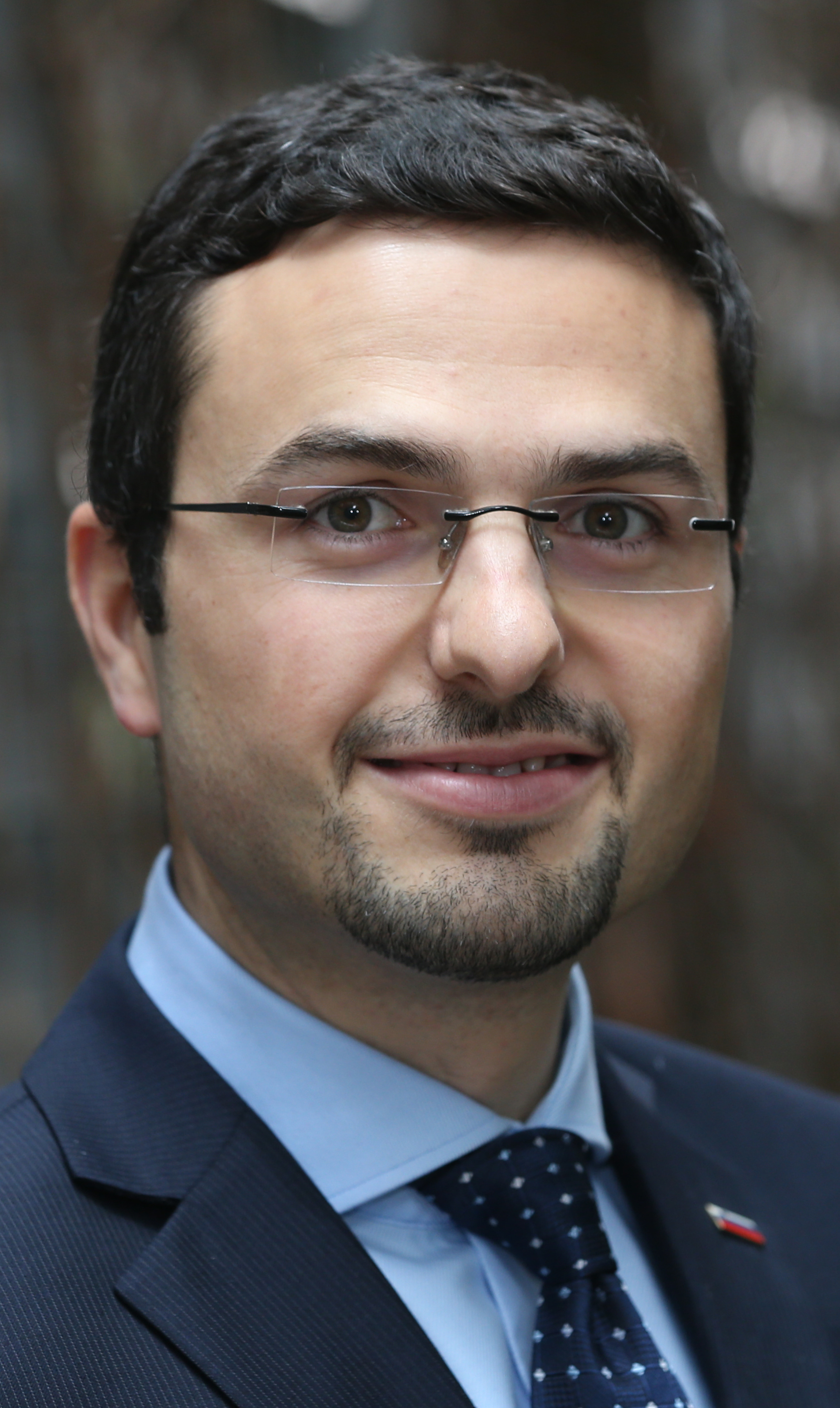

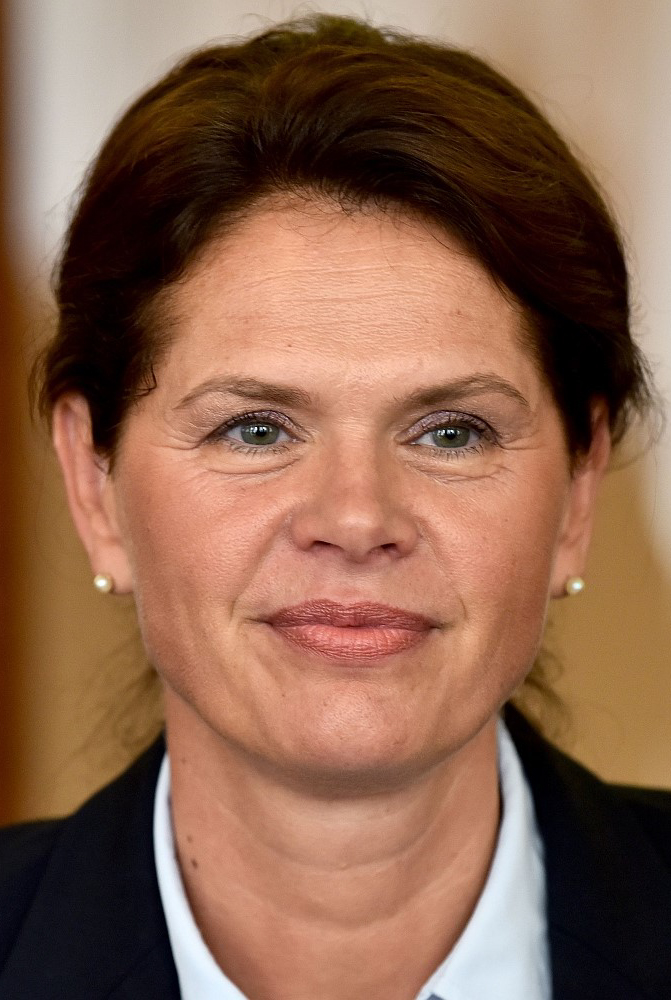

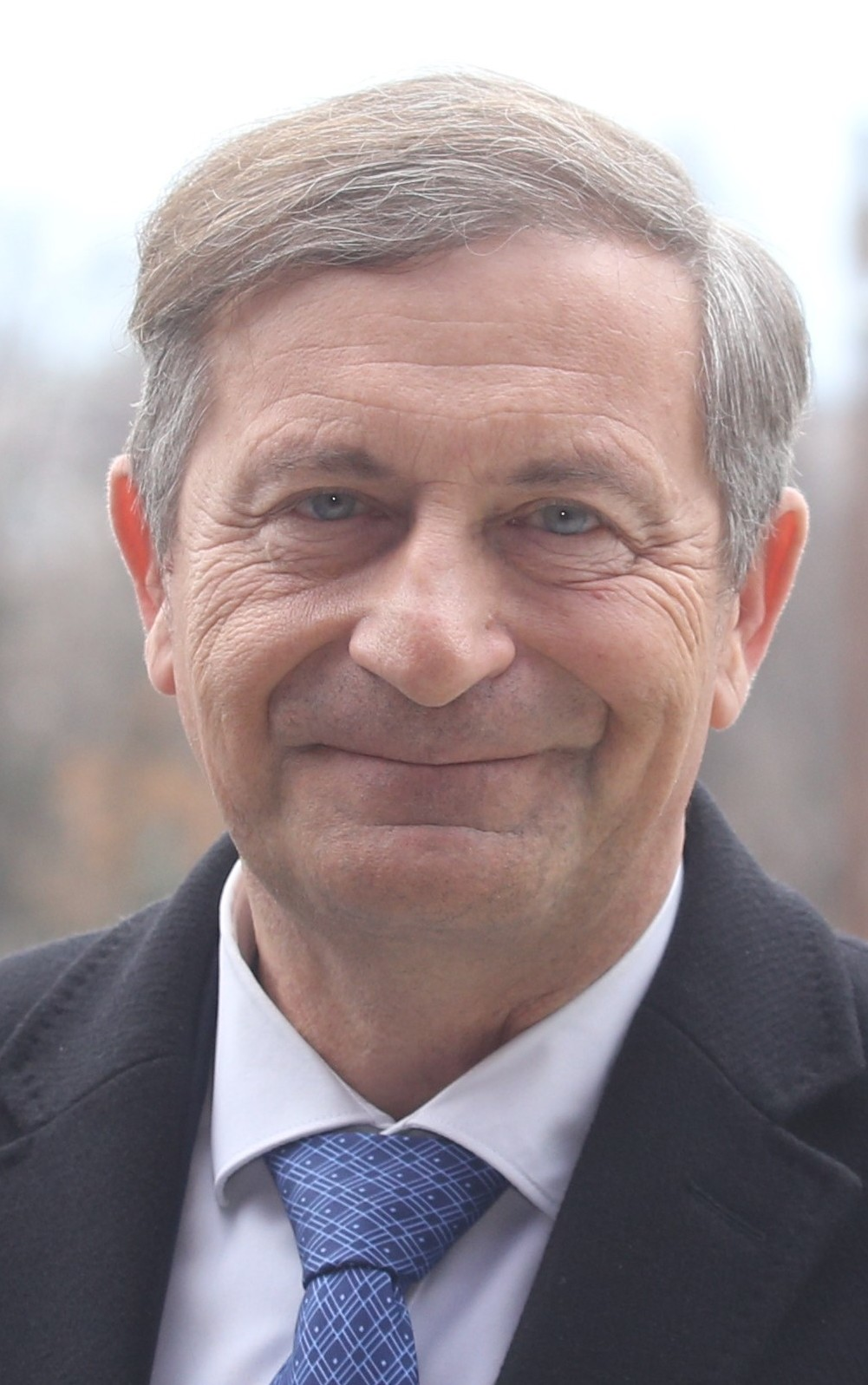

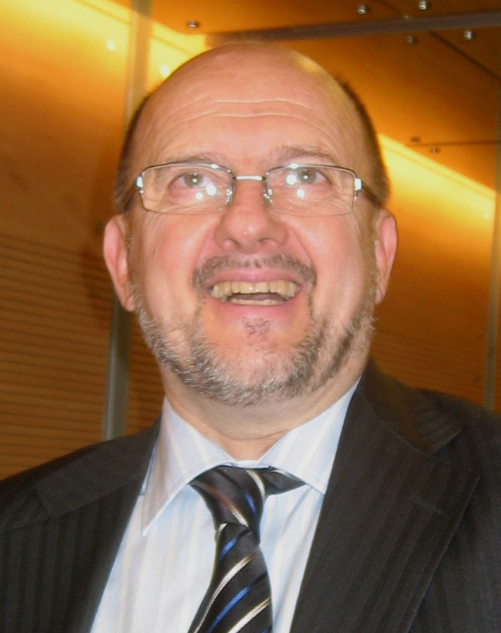
	First party	Second party	Third party
Leader	Janez Janša	Marjan Šarec	Dejan Židan
Party	SDS	LMŠ	SD
Last election	21 seats	–	6 seats
Seats won	25	13	10
Seat change	▲4	New	▲4
Popular vote	222,042	112,250	88,524
Percentage	24.92%	12.60%	9.93%
	Fourth party	Fifth party	Sixth party
Leader	Miro Cerar	Luka Mesec	Matej Tonin
Party	SMC	Levica	NSi
Last election	36 seats	6 seats (as ZL)	5 seats
Seats won	10	9	7
Seat change	▼26	▲3	▲2
Popular vote	86,868	83,108	63,792
Percentage	9.75%	9.33%	7.16%
	Seventh party	Eighth party	Ninth party
Leader	Alenka Bratušek	Karl Erjavec	Zmago Jelinčič
Party	SAB	DeSUS	SNS
Last election	4 seats (as ZaAB)	10 seats	0 seats
Seats won	5	5	4
Seat change	▲1	▼5	▲4
Popular vote	45,492	43,889	37,182
Percentage	5.11%	4.93%	4.17%
- Map of the election results, showing the seats won by each party in each of the 8 multi-member constituencies.
Prime Minister before election
Miro Cerar
SMC
Prime Minister after election
Marjan Šarec
LMŠ

Parliamentary elections were held in Slovenia on 3 June 2018. The elections were originally expected to be held later in June 2018, but after the resignation of Prime Minister Miro Cerar on 14 March 2018 all parties called for snap elections. They were the third consecutive snap elections after 2011 and 2014.

== Background ==
On 14 March 2018, Supreme Court of the Republic of Slovenia delivered a judgement regarding the railway referendum, held in 2017 on the construction of a second railway connection from Koper to Divača. In the judgement, the court annulled the results and ordered a new vote. The railway link was the biggest project of the Cerar cabinet.

Later that day, Prime Minister Cerar announced that he would resign from the post at a press conference following a cabinet meeting. Cerar explained that he had resigned due to bad relations within the coalition between the Social Democrats (SD) and the Democratic Party of Pensioners of Slovenia (DeSUS) following a decision of the Supreme Court earlier that day, which he stated would slow down the infrastructural development of Slovenia due to strikes and demands of public sector trade unions. The following day, he sent his letter of resignation to the Speaker of the National Assembly. Cerar was the second consecutive Prime Minister after Alenka Bratušek to resign. The two previous Prime Ministers, Janez Janša (2012–2013) and Borut Pahor (2008–2012), were removed from the office by vote of no confidence, meaning that Janša's first term in office (2004–2008) remains the most recently completed full term in office.

After the resignation of a prime minister, a new candidate can be nominated by the president. However, President Borut Pahor announced after a meeting with Cerar that he would not nominate anyone for the post. Members of the National Assembly also announced that they would not nominate a candidate, and called for early elections.

According to the Constitution, regularly scheduled elections should have been held no sooner than two months and no later than 15 days before the expiry of four years from the first session of current National Assembly. Elections were therefore expected to be held between 1 June and 15 July 2018. Following the resignation of Cerar, elections were held on 3 June 2018.

On 20 March 2018, the Slovenian Democratic Party (SDS) announced that after consultations with President Pahor they were calling for elections to be held on 10 June 2018 and that they would nominate a candidate for prime minister to postpone the elections if needed. The Modern Centre Party (SMC) also called for elections to be held at a later date due to the ongoing procedure to adopt a constitutional law protecting the country's biggest bank, NLB, from Croatian actions in violation of international agreement between the countries as well as the upcoming process before the European Court of Justice on arbitration between Slovenia and Croatia. On the same day, independent MP Janko Veber announced that he would try and nominate himself for the position of interim prime minister, though none of the political parties expressed its support.

At the time of Cerar's resignation, four investigative commissions were ongoing in the National Assembly. Two of them are investigating banks (one on why an injection of €3.2 billion of equity capital was needed during the premiership of Alenka Bratušek and the other on the possible funding of terrorism through Slovenian banks), one is looking at corruption during the construction of the Šoštanj Thermal Power Plant (TEŠ6); and the other investigating corruption in healthcare system. All four commissions are expected to issue final reports in April and May, which must be approved by a vote in the National Assembly. Some current politicians are expected to be charged with responsibility for the scandals, including Janez Janša (SDS) and Borut Pahor (SD). It was suggested in the media that Social Democrats may be in favour of early elections so that the commissions could not finish their work.

On 14 April 2018, after no candidate for the prime minister was nominated, President Pahor dissolved the National Assembly and decided elections will be held on 3 June 2018.

== Campaign ==
The Italian minority representative in the National Assembly, Roberto Battelli, who has held the post for seven consecutive terms and was the only one to hold this position so far, announced on 16 March 2018 that he would not run again in the following elections. He was one of only two representatives (the other being Janez Janša) to be elected in every election since Slovenia gained its independence in 1992 from Yugoslavia.

During the signing of a treaty with Russian company Gazprom to supply Slovenia with natural gas on April 13, 2018, the Russian ambassador to Slovenia Doku Zavgayev publicly offered support to DeSUS. This was seen as a diplomatic scandal in Slovenia and an act that violated the Vienna Convention on Diplomatic Relations (VCDR) according to Speaker of National Assembly Milan Brglez (SMC). However, Foreign Minister and DeSUS president Karl Erjavec, a supporter of good relations with Russia, did not see the act as a violation of diplomatic protocol, saying that the ambassador only supported their program and that he hoped other ambassadors would also support it. The Slovenian media speculated that the act could have been pre-arranged between Zavgayev and Erjavec. Former foreign minister Dimitrij Rupel also criticized the Russian ambassador, saying he violated Article 41 and Article 42 of VCDR, which explicitly forbids interference in the internal affairs of a host state. Chairman of the National Assembly Foreign Politics Committee Jožef Horvat (NSi) said that he had never seen anything like it. President Borut Pahor made no statement about the matter. This was the second time a foreign ambassador had interfered in Slovenian internal affairs after American ambassador Joseph A. Mussomeli had offered his help in forming a government coalition after the 2011 elections, for which he was criticized by then-President Danilo Türk. Ambassador Mussomeli was later called for consultations by the Ministry of Foreign Affairs to explain his statements. Then Ambassador of Slovenia to the United States Roman Kirn (now LMŠ) also met with representatives of State Department.

On 19 April 2018, two Modern Centre Party (SMC) MPs, Branko Zorman and Bojan Krajnc, left the party after National Assembly did not pass Zorman's bill that would liberalize gambling market in Slovenia (which is according to Zorman under control of Social Democrats), saying that party supports corruption (Prime Minister Cerar personally intervened in the SMC Deputy Group and asked MPs to vote against the bill). On that day Simona Kustec Lipicer MP, leader of the SMC in the National Assembly announced that she would not run again in the 2018 elections. However, the party denied Zorman's accusations, saying that Zorman is not pleased with him not being one of the candidates in the 2018 elections and that Krajnc was not satisfied with the electoral district he would have run in.

On 23 April 2018, Milan Balažic (NSD) accused President Borut Pahor of acts which brought Slovenia under the subordination of another country as he had signed the Arbitration Agreement between Croatia and Slovenia when Prime Minister. This is the second charge for President Pahor since 10 April 2018, when the National Assembly charged him in the Final Report of "TEŠ6 Investigative Commission". Solidarnost subsequently started a petition calling for Pahor's resignation. In response, Pahor said that he had already paid for these actions when he lost the 2011 elections.

On 24 April 2018, Slovenian media reported that Matej Tonin (NSi) possessed documents that proved that foreign minister Karl Erjavec (DeSUS) has worked for Croatia during Arbitration between the countries. Tonin informed MPs on the content of the documents at a closed session of the National Assembly. Tonin also stated that he could not release them yet because they were still a state secret. DeSUS accused him of lying.

After parties submitted their candidature lists, some media questioned which MPs supported the lists of candidates of the Party of Alenka Bratušek and the party Good Country. The Party of Alenka Bratušek has only 2 MPs (Alenka Bratušek and Mirjam Bon Klanjšček) and Good Country has only one MP (Bojan Dobovšek), while to submit a list of candidates, the signatures of 3 MPs are needed. The State Election Commission refused to provide the names of the MPs that supported the lists of candidates. Media also stressed that not announcing the names of the supporting MPs is against Good Country's efforts for transparency in politics. According to the media, one of the MPs that supported Good Country's list is Franc Laj, former MP for Modern Centre Party (SMC), now forming Deputy Group of Independent MPs in the National Assembly, together with Bratušek, Bon Klanjšček and Dobovšek. The names of the other two MPs remained unknown, though some media speculated that Branko Zorman and Bojan Kranjc, also former SMC MPs, who left the party just before the beginning of the campaign, could have supported the candidature lists. MPs of Social Democrats and Modern Centre Party (Dobovšek was elected as SMC MP in 2014, but left the party soon after the elections) were also said to have offered their signatures. Media later reported that SMC MP Vlasta Počkaj supported candidature lists of Party of Alenka Bratušek and Marija Antonija Kovačič, DeSUS MP, supported the candidature list of Dobovšek's Good Country.

The official election campaign began on 4 May 2018. The main topics of the campaign were relations with Croatia (arbitration, NLB), the public healthcare system, banks and corruption, hate speech, the level of the minimum wage and pensions, the level of poverty, as well as foreign policy and the positioning of Slovenia in the international community, especially relations with the United States.

On 5 May 2018, Slovenian media reported that the list of candidates that United Right submitted in the 6th constituency (Novo Mesto) had been rejected because it was not formed according to the 'gender quota' law, which stipulates that at least 35% of the candidates much be of the opposite sex. United Right submitted a list with 7 male and 2 female candidates, but both female candidates would run in two electoral districts each. The party also contested the decision of the Electoral Commission of the 6th constituency in the Supreme Court, which rejected their appeal on 8 May. The incident was seen as damaging to the party, since its leader, Aleš Primc, would run in this constituency. The Electoral Commission of the 5th constituency rejected the list of United left and Unity for a similar reason. According to the head of Unity, Janko Veber, the Supreme Court rejected their appeal; he added that the party would contest this decision in the Constitutional Court. However, according to the law a decision by the Supreme Court is final, said Director of the State Election Commission Dušan Vučko. Unity proposed delaying the election until the verdict of the Constitutional court after the Supreme Court rejected United Right's appeal as well and they proposed the same. On 14 May, the Constitutional Court rejected United Left's appeal. On 7 May, United Right's list of candidates in the 1st constituency was rejected as well for the same reason as the one in the 6th constituency since Metka Zevnik, another key candidate would run in this constituency, the party lost its possibilities to reach the threshold of 4%, Slovenian media reported. This problem opened a broad discussion on gender quotas in politics in Slovenia. The State Election Commission reported on 8 May that the list of Party of Slovenian People in the 2nd constituency had been partially rejected due to a candidate on the list that died in 2017 and was then removed. It also reported that the Social Democrats and the party Andrej Čuš and the Greens of Slovenia (AČZS) had put the same candidate on their lists. The candidate was removed from the list of Andrej Čuš and the Greens of Slovenia because the list of Social Democrats had been submitted first. Due to the removal of the candidate from the list of AČZS, the list in the 3rd constituency was rejected by the State Election Commission (DVK) on 9 May for not reaching the gender quota. Media stressed that two of the four members of the DVK who voted to reject the list were appointed by Social Democrats and SDP (which is the former party of Andrej Čuš). The Supreme Court annulled the decision made by DVK on 12 May.

Hungary's prime minister Viktor Orbán, an ally of Janez Janša, came to stump with Janša in mid-May at a rally in Celje, declaring: "If Europe surrenders to mass population movement and immigration, our own Continent will be lost [...] The aim is to settle among us people who do not belong to our culture, and who will want to live here according to their own religions and customs". The Slovenian Democratic Party (SDS) also ran on an anti-immigration platform. One of the SDS's posters depicted migrants and refugees behind a stop sign. In a pre-election debate, a party lawmaker said that "no migrants means a secure Slovenia". Hence, a frequent topic of election debates was hate speech, especially due to Janez Janša and other members of SDS, who are frequently involved in discussions which include hate speech, especially on Twitter. Lucija Ušaj and Žan Mahnič MP, both SDS and candidates in the elections, were exposed because of their activity on Twitter, where they frequently publish statements that can arguably be recognized as hate speech against homosexuals, migrants, Muslims, or political opponents.

=== Electoral debates ===
Date Time	Organiser	Moderator(s)	Parties																		
Date Time	Organiser	Moderator(s)	AČZS	DeSUS	GAS	ZZD	DD	LNBP	LMŠ	SMC	SN	NSi	SAB	Pirati	SDS	SNS	SLS	SD	Solid.	Levica	ZSi
7 May; 20:00	TV SLO 1	Rosvita Pesek; Dejan Ladika	P Čuš	P Erjavec	P Kovšca	P Kos	P Dobovšek	P Požar	P Šarec	P Cerar	P Bešić	P Tonin	P Bratušek	P Andrée	P Janša	P Jelinčič	P Zidanšek	P Židan	P Lubej	P Mesec	P Šiško
17 May; 20:00	TV SLO 1	Erika Žnidaršič; Mojca Širok; Janja Koren	NI	P Erjavec	NI	NI	NI	NI	NI	P Brglez; Cerar; Počivalšek	NI	P Novak; Horvat; Hajdinjak	P Bratušek	NI	P Gorenak; Grims; Šircelj	NI	P Zidanšek	P Han; Nemec; Olaj	NI	P Vatovec; Kordiš	NI
21 May; 20:00	POP TV	Petra Krčmar	NI	P Erjavec	NI	NI	NI	NI	P Šarec	P Cerar	NI	P Tonin	NI	NI	P Janša	NI	NI	P Židan	NI	P Mesec	NI
24 May; 20:00	TV SLO 1	Erika Žnidaršič; Mojca Širok; Janja Koren	P Čuš	NI	P Kovšca	P Kos	P Dobovšek	P Požar	P Šarec	NI	P Bešić	NI	NI	P Andrée	NI	P Jelinčič	NI	NI	P Lubej	NI	P Šiško
28 May; 20:00	POP TV	Uroš Slak	NI	P Erjavec	NI	NI	NI	NI	P Šarec	P Cerar	NI	P Tonin	NI	NI	P Janša	NI	NI	P Židan	NI	P Mesec	NI
28 May; 20:00	TV SLO 1	Tanja Gobec	NI	P Bizjak	NI	NI	NI	NI	NI	P Brglez	NI	P Hajdinjak	P Bratušek	NI	P Logar	NI	P Zidanšek	P Švarc	NI	P Vatovec	NI
30 May; 20:00	Planet TV	Mirko Mayer	NI	P Erjavec	NI	NI	NI	NI	P Šarec	P Cerar	NI	P Tonin	P Bratušek	NI	P Janša	P Jelinčič	NI	P Židan	NI	P Tomić	NI
31 May; 20:00	TV SLO 1	Erika Žnidaršič; Igor E. Bergant	P Čuš	P Erjavec	P Kovšca	P Kos	P Dobovšek	P Požar	P Šarec	P Cerar	P Bešić	P Tonin	P Bratušek	P Andrée	P Janša	P Jelinčič	P Zidanšek	P Židan	P Lubej	P Mesec	P Šiško
1 June; 20:00	POP TV	Darja Zgonc; Edi Pucer	NI	P Erjavec	NI	NI	NI	NI	P Šarec	P Cerar	NI	P Tonin	P Bratušek	NI	P Janša	NI	NI	P Židan	NI	P Mesec	NI
P Invited/Present NI Non-invitee A Absent invitee

- Not included: NPS, SSN, SPS, ReSET, ZL and ZD which were not invited to any of the debates or decided not to take part.

== Electoral system ==
The 90 members of the National Assembly are elected by two methods. 88 are elected by open list proportional representation in eight 11-seat constituencies and seats are allocated to the parties at the constituency level using the Droop quota. The elected Deputies are identified by ranking all of a party's candidates in a constituency by the percentage of votes they received in their district. The seats that remain unallocated are allocated to the parties at the national level using the d'Hondt method with an electoral threshold of 4%. Although the country is divided into 88 electoral districts, deputies are not elected from all 88 districts. More than one deputy is elected in some districts, which results in some districts not having an elected deputy (for instance, 21 of 88 electoral districts did not have an elected deputy in the 2014 elections). Parties must have at least 35% of their lists from each gender, except in cases where there are only three candidates. For these lists, there must be at least one candidate of each gender.

Two additional deputies are elected by the Italian and Hungarian minorities (one each) via the Borda count.

== Parties and leaders ==
The table lists all the parties that expressed their intention to participate in the elections. SMC, SDS, DeSUS, SD, Levica, NSi, SAB, AČZS, DD and Unity were represented in the National Assembly. Not all of the following political parties would take part in the elections, due to the criteria set by the law (candidate lists supported with signatures of 3 MPs or 100 signatures in each constituency), especially the smaller ones.

Parties had to form their lists of candidates for each constituency by 3 May 2018.

=== Parties that fulfill the criteria ===
X	Constituency with submitted list of candidates
	Rejected list of candidates

Party/Alliance		Leader	Support	Constituency							
Party/Alliance		Leader	Support	1	2	3	4	5	6	7	8
AČZS	Andrej Čuš and the Greens of Slovenia; Andrej Čuš in Zeleni Slovenije	Andrej Čuš		X	X	X	X	X	X	X	X
DeSUS	Democratic Party of Pensioners of Slovenia; Demokratična stranka upokojencev Slovenije	Karl Erjavec	3 MPs	X	X	X	X	X	X	X	X
GAS	Economic Active Party; Gospodarsko aktivna stranka	Alojz Kovšca		X	X	X	X	X	X	X	X
ZZD	For a Healthy Society; Za zdravo družbo	Miran Žitko		X	X	X	X	X	X	X	X
NPS	Forward Slovenia; Naprej Slovenija	Blaž Svetek		X							
DD	Good Country; Dobra država	Bojan Dobovšek	3 MPs	X	X	X	X	X	X	X	X
LNBP	List of Journalist Bojan Požar; Lista novinarja Bojana Požarja	Bojan Požar		X	X	X	X	X	X	X	X
LMŠ	List of Marjan Šarec; Lista Marjana Šarca	Marjan Šarec		X	X	X	X	X	X	X	X
SMC	Modern Centre Party; Stranka modernega centra	Miro Cerar	3 MPs	X	X	X	X	X	X	X	X
NSi	New Slovenia - Christian Democrats; Nova Slovenija - Krščanski demokrati	Matej Tonin	3 MPs	X	X	X	X	X	X	X	X
SAB	Party of Alenka Bratušek; Stranka Alenke Bratušek	Alenka Bratušek	3 MPs	X	X	X	X	X	X	X	X
SSN	Party of Slovenian People; Stranka slovenskega naroda	Marjan Žandar		X	X	X	X	X	X	X	X
Pirati	Pirate Party of Slovenia; Piratska stranka Slovenije	Rok Andrée		X	X	X	X	X	X	X	X
ReSET	Save Slovenia from Elite and Tycoons; Rešimo Slovenijo elite in tajkunov							X		X	X
SDS	Slovenian Democratic Party; Slovenska demokratska stranka	Janez Janša	3 MPs	X	X	X	X	X	X	X	X
SNS	Slovenian National Party; Slovenska nacionalna stranka	Zmago Jelinčič Plemeniti		X	X	X	X	X	X	X	X
SLS	Slovenian People's Party; Slovenska ljudska stranka	Marko Zidanšek		X	X	X	X	X	X	X	X
SD	Social Democrats; Socialni demokrati	Dejan Židan	3 MPs	X	X	X	X	X	X	X	X
SPS	Socialist Party of Slovenia; Socialistična partija Slovenije	Tadej Trček		X	X	X	X	X	X		X
Solidarnost	Solidarity - For a Fair Society! Solidarnost - za pravično družbo!	Uroš Lubej		X	X	X	X	X	X	X	X
SN	Together Forward; Skupaj naprej	Danijel Bešić Loredan		X	X	X	X	X	X	X	X
Levica	The Left; Levica	Luka Mesec	3 MPs	X	X	X	X	X	X	X	X
ZL-S	United Left and Unity; Združena levica in Sloga	Janko Veber; Franc Žnidaršič		X	X	X	X	X	X	X	X
ZD	United Right (NLS+za otroke); Združena desnica	Franc Kangler; Aleš Primc		X	X	X	X	X	X	X	X
ZSi	United Slovenia; Zedinjena Slovenija	Andrej Šiško		X	X	X	X	X	X	X	X
Number of parties in the constituency				24	23	23	24	24	25	23	24
Source: State Election Commission

=== List of all the parties ===
Party/Coalition		Ideology		Leader	2014 (%)	Seats in Parliament		Government
Party/Coalition		Policies	Axis	Leader	2014 (%)	Start	End	Government
SMC	Modern Centre Party; Stranka modernega centra	Liberalism; Social liberalism Pro-Europeanism	Centre; Centre-left	Miro Cerar; Prime Minister	34.61%	36 / 90	34 / 90	Government
SDS	Slovenian Democratic Party; Slovenska demokratska stranka	Liberal conservatism National conservatism Social conservatism Pro-Europeanism; Atlanticism; Right-wing populism Anti-immigration	Centre-right; Right-wing	Janez Janša; MP, former Prime Minister	20.69%	21 / 90	19 / 90	Opposition
DeSUS	Democratic Party of Pensioners of Slovenia; Demokratična stranka upokojencev Slovenije	Pensioners interests Single-issue politics Social justice	Centre-left	Karl Erjavec; Minister of Foreign Affairs	10.21%	10 / 90	11 / 90	Government
NSi	New Slovenia - Christian Democrats; Nova Slovenija - Krščanski demokrati	Christian democracy Liberal conservatism Social conservatism Pro-Europeanism; Atlanticism	Centre-right	Matej Tonin; MP	5.59%	5 / 90	5 / 90	Opposition
SD	Social Democrats; Socialni demokrati	Social Democracy; Pro-Europeanism	Centre-left; Left-wing	Dejan Židan; Minister of Agriculture, Forestry and Food	5.98%	6 / 90	5 / 90	Government
Levica	The Left; Levica	Democratic socialism Eco-socialism; Anti-capitalism; Soft Euroscepticism; Left-wing populism	Far-left	Luka Mesec; MP	New	New	5 / 90	Opposition
SAB	Party of Alenka Bratušek; Stranka Alenke Bratušek	Social liberalism Pro-Europeanism	Centre-left	Alenka Bratušek; MP, former Prime Minister	4.38% (Note: As Alliance of Alenka Bratušek, later renamed to Alliance of Social Liberal Democrats and Party of Alenka Bratušek (currently))	4 / 90	2 / 90	Opposition
AČZS	Andrej Čuš and Greens of Slovenia; Andrej Čuš in Zeleni Slovenije	Green liberalism Green conservatism Populism	Centre-right	Andrej Čuš; MP	0.53%	0 / 90	2 / 90	Opposition
DD	Good State; Dobra država	Anti-corruption; Anti-elitism	Centre; Centre-left	Bojan Dobovšek; MP	New	New	1 / 90	Opposition
ZL	United Left; Združena levica	Democratic socialism Eco-socialism; Anti-capitalism; Soft Euroscepticism; Left-wing populism	Left-wing	collective leadership	5.97% (Note: United Left divided into The Left and ZL-DSD in 2017, 5 MPs joined The Left and 1 MP joined ZL-DSD)	6 / 90	Dissolved	Opposition
ZL-S	United Left and Unity; Združena levica in Sloga		Centre-Left	Janko Veber; MP, former Speaker of the National Assembly, former Minister of Defence; Franc Žnidaršič; Former MP, former State Secretary	New	New	1 / 90	Opposition
SLS	Slovenian People's Party; Slovenska ljudska stranka	Conservatism; Agrarianism; Christian democracy	Centre-right	Marko Zidanšek; National Councilor	3.95%	0 / 90	0 / 90	
SNS	Slovenian National Party; Slovenska nacionalna stranka	Slovenian nationalism Populism; Euroscepticism; Protectionism	Far-right	Zmago Jelinčič Plemeniti; Former MP	2.20%	0 / 90	0 / 90	
Pirati	Pirate Party of Slovenia; Piratska stranka Slovenije	Pirate politics Freedom of information Open government Network neutrality	Syncretic	Rok Andrée	1.34%	0 / 90	0 / 90	
NPS	Forward Slovenia; Naprej Slovenija	Slovenian nationalism Populism	Far-right	Blaž Svetek	0.24%	0 / 90	0 / 90	
GAS	Economic Active Party; Gospodarsko aktivna stranka		Centre-right	Alojz Kovšca; President of National Council	0.05% (Note: As Liberal Economic Party (Liberalno gospodarska stranka))	0 / 90	0 / 90	
Solid.	Solidarity - For a Fair Society! Solidarnost - za pravično družbo!	Social democracy Progressivism	Left-wing	Uroš Lubej	(5.98%) (Note: Solidarnost formed an unofficial coalition with Social Democrats before 2014 elections, none of their candidates was elected)	0 / 90	0 / 90	
LDS	Liberal Democracy of Slovenia; Liberalna demokracija Slovenije	Liberalism; Social liberalism	Centre-left	Luj Šprohar	Did not participate in 2014			
LNBP	List of Journalist Bojan Požar (Note: Party renamed after Požar took it over, previous name was List for Maribor (Lista za Maribor)); Lista novinarja Bojana Požarja	Anti-elitism; Populism	Centre-right	Bojan Požar	Did not participate in 2014			
LMŠ	List of Marjan Šarec; Lista Marjana Šarca	Social liberalism Populism; Big tent Social democracy	Centre-left	Marjan Šarec; Mayor of Kamnik	Did not participate in 2014			
SSN	Party of Slovenian People; Stranka slovenskega naroda	Direct democracy Soft euroscepticism	Right-wing	Marjan Žandar	Did not participate in 2014			
ZSi	United Slovenia; Zedinjena Slovenija	Slovenian nationalism Populism third-position Direct Democracy	Far-right	Andrej Šiško	Did not participate in 2014			
SPS	Socialist Party of Slovenia; Socialistična partija Slovenije	Socialism; Marxism–Leninism; Titoism; Euroscepticism; Pan-Slavism	Far-left	Tadej Trček	New			
ReSET	Save Slovenia from Elite and Tycoons; Rešimo Slovenijo elite in tajkunov			Martin Ivec	New			
DP	Taxpayers; Davkoplačevalci se ne damo	Single-issue politics Populism	Centre-right	Vili Kovačič	New			
NS	New Social Democrats; Novi socialdemokrati	Social democracy	Left-wing	Milan Balažic; Former MP, former Ambassador	New			
ZZD	For a Healthy Society; Za zdravo družbo	Single-issue politics Anti-corruption		Miran Žitko	New			
SSSS	Social Party of Serbs of Slovenia; Socialna stranka Srbov Slovenije	Single-issue politics Serbian nationalism	Centre-left	Saša Gajić	New			
SN	Movement Together Forward; Gibanje Skupaj naprej	Single-issue politics		Danijel Bešić Loredan	New			
ZD	United Right; Združena desnica	Conservatism	Right-wing	Franc Kangler; Aleš Primc	New			

== Results ==
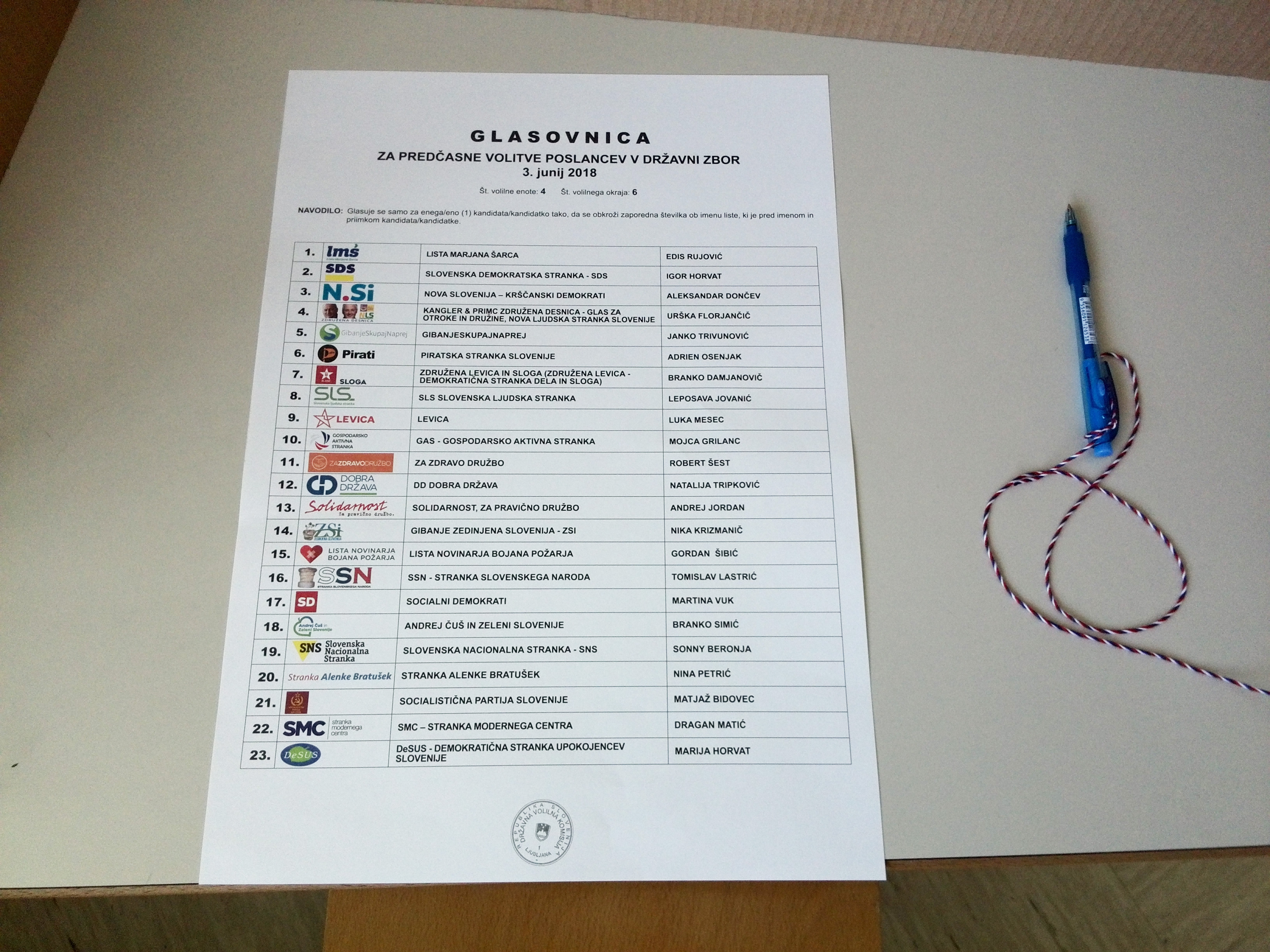
Ballot paper in the 6th electoral district of the 4th constituency in 2018 elections

Party	Votes	%	Seats	+/–
Slovenian Democratic Party	222,042	24.92	25	+4
List of Marjan Šarec	112,250	12.60	13	New
Social Democrats	88,524	9.93	10	+4
Modern Centre Party	86,868	9.75	10	–26
The Left	83,108	9.33	9	+3
New Slovenia – Christian Democrats	63,792	7.16	7	+2
Party of Alenka Bratušek	45,492	5.11	5	+1
Democratic Party of Pensioners of Slovenia	43,889	4.93	5	–5
Slovenian National Party	37,182	4.17	4	+4
Slovenian People's Party	23,329	2.62	0	0
Pirate Party	19,182	2.15	0	0
Good State	13,540	1.52	0	New
Andrej Čuš and Greens of Slovenia	9,708	1.09	0	–2
List of Journalist Bojan Požar	7,835	0.88	0	New
For a Healthy Society	5,548	0.62	0	New
United Slovenia	5,287	0.59	0	New
United Left and Unity	5,072	0.57	0	New
Movement Together Forward	4,345	0.49	0	New
Save Slovenia from Elite and Tycoons	3,672	0.41	0	New
Economic Active Party	3,132	0.35	0	New
Solidarity - For a Fair Society!	2,184	0.25	0	New
United Right (ZA OTROKE!–NLS)	2,141	0.24	0	New
Socialist Party of Slovenia	1,551	0.17	0	New
Party of Slovenian People	1,237	0.14	0	New
Forward Slovenia	187	0.02	0	New
Italian and Hungarian national minorities			2	0
Total	891,097	100.00	90	0
Valid votes	891,097	98.85		
Invalid/blank votes	10,357	1.15		
Total votes	901,454	100.00		
Registered voters/turnout	1,712,676	52.63		
Source: Volitve

=== Representatives of national minorities ===
==== Hungarian national minority ====
Candidate	Votes	%
Ferenc Horvath	4,193	60.20
Gabriela Sobočan	2,772	39.80
Total	6,965	100.00
Valid votes	3,001	98.62
Invalid/blank votes	42	1.38
Total votes	3,043	100.00
Source: Volitve

==== Italian national minority ====
Candidate	Votes	%
Felice Žiža	2,511	44.78
Maurizio Tremul	2,095	37.36
Bruno Orlando	1,001	17.85
Total	5,607	100.00
Valid votes	1,428	98.69
Invalid/blank votes	19	1.31
Total votes	1,447	100.00
Source: Volitve

=== Elected MPs ===
Janez Janša became the only MP to be elected in every election since independence. Several former MPs returned to parliament, including Zmago Jelinčič Plemeniti (SNS) and Brane Golubović (LMŠ, previously PS). All presidents of parliamentary parties were elected except Alenka Bratušek (SAB) and Karl Erjavec (DeSUS).

== Reactions ==
=== Domestic ===
After the election, Janša stated that SDS would do everything in their power to form a stable government. He also expressed the opinion that it was impossible to form a new government without SDS. Articles in the newspaper Delo noted that although SDS had won the most votes, it had not won the election as it would be difficult for the party to form a coalition, since Janša had acted divisively in the past, making potential coalition partners wary. Šarec was viewed as the key player, either as a potential coalition partner with SDS (a scenario that Šarec denounced) or as the prime minister-designate if Janša would fail to form the government.

Although losing a large share of the vote in comparison to the 2014 election, the result of SMC was viewed as a success as the party did not have a strong traditional voting base. With hindsight, Cerar's decision to resign as PM was seen as a smart tactical move.

The results of The Left and Party of Alenka Bratušek were seen as a success for these parties, while SD was seen as losing votes to the Left. DeSUS got fewer MPs than in 2014, possibly because their alliance with Zoran Jankovič had not paid off. NSi increased the number of seats but Tonin nevertheless offered his resignation to the party, not having fulfilled his goal of reaching above 10%.

Party leaders Alenka Bratušek of PAB and Karl Erjavec of DeSUS did not get elected into the parliament.

The return of SNS after 7 years of absence was viewed as a side-effect of the nationalist rhetoric in the media. Jelinčič stated that he was interested in joining the next government as minister of culture.

SLS, once an influential party that participated in several governments, again failed to reach the 4% vote threshold, likely at the expense of SDS. Marko Zidanšek, the party president, immediately resigned.

=== International ===
Some European politicians congratulated Janez Janša for his victory, among them the President of the European Commission Jean-Claude Juncker, Austrian chancellor Sebastian Kurz and Manfred Weber, leader of the EPP group in the European Parliament.

Several international media, including BBC, CNBC and Al Jazeera, reported on the election result, labelling SDS as "anti-immigration" party and noted that the formation of a stable government would be difficult. The New York Times highlighted Janša's connection to Viktor Orbán, the PM of Hungary, who openly supported SDS, including with Hungarian companies financing the pro-SDS media.

== Aftermath ==
=== Constitution of the 8th National Assembly ===
By law, the opening session of the National Assembly must take place within 20 days of the elections. It was convened by President Borut Pahor for 22 June 2018 at 11:00. The speaker of the National Assembly will be elected at the session. The speaker is usually elected among the MPs of the second largest coalition party, though this is not a rule. Milan Brglez (SMC) was elected speaker in 2014 and France Cukjati (SDS) in 2004.

First session will be presided over by Peter Jožef Česnik (SAB), who is the oldest of the elected MPs.

In the first session only temporary speaker of the National Assembly could be elected, since there is still not outlines of the new coalition. If Speaker will not be elected, Peter Jožef Česnik will become acting speaker until speaker is elected.

Deputy speakers of the National Assembly are expected to be elected later after official formation of the coalition. Two deputy speakers will be elected among the MPs of the coalition parties and one will be elected among the MPs of the biggest opposition party.

Before the constitution of the National Assembly, parties have to name temporary leaders of the political groups. Temporary leader meet with the previous speaker of the National Assembly to organise constitutional session of the new NA, including agenda of the session, members of the Commission for Public Office and Elections, which will convene during the first session to confirm mandates of the elected MPs, and sitting order. SDS surprised with naming Danijel Krivec instead of Jože Tanko, who led the group of SDS for the last 13 years. A reason for that could be disagreements between Tanko and Janez Janša and his disobedience. For example, Tanko was the only member of SDS group that voted in favor of same-sex marriages in the last term and SDS later took part in the campaign against the law in the referendum. In SMC, there were also some internal dissents when party named Igor Zorčič as leader instead of Milan Brglez, who wanted the position himself.

Party	Temporary leader
SDS	Danijel Krivec
LMŠ	Brane Golubović
SD	Matjaž Han
SMC	Igor Zorčič
Levica	Matej Tašner Vatovec
NSi	Matej Tonin
SAB	Marko Bandelli
DeSUS	Franc Jurša
SNS	Zmago Jelinčič

On 18 June temporary leaders of political groups had a meeting with Speaker Milan Brglez to discuss the first session. Jože Tanko (SDS) was chosen to be named President of the Commission for Public Office and Elections.

==== Election of the Speaker ====
Candidate	Votes	Yes	No	Invalid
Matej Tonin	89	80	9	1

Matej Tonin had support of the all parties, except The Left.

===== Possible candidates for Speaker of the National Assembly =====
Candidate	Party	Positions	
Matej Tonin	NSi	MP (2011–present)	Tonin is not likely to be elected or supported by center-left and center parties, since he might join coalition under Janša.
Samo Bevk	SD	MP (1996–2013)	SD is claiming the position due to the tradition, that the second biggest coalition party should get the position.
Matjaž Nemec	SD	MP (2014–present); Deputy Speaker of the National Assembly(2016–present)	SD is claiming the position due to the tradition, that the second biggest coalition party should get the position.
Dejan Židan	SD	MP (2011–present); Minister of Agriculture, Forestry and Food (2010–present)	SD is claiming the position due to the tradition, that the second biggest coalition party should get the position.
Miro Cerar	SMC	Prime Minister (2014–2018); MP (2014–present)	Cerar is claiming the position, since he is not intersed in any of the ministerial positions.
Milan Brglez	SMC	MP (2014–present); Speaker of the National Assembly(2014–present)	

On 12 June, Marjan Šarec said that LMŠ will not propose a candidate for the speaker of the National Assembly. SD claimed the position, since it will be the second biggest coalition party, if Marjan Šarec forms coalition.

If Miro Cerar is elected Speaker it will be the first time that sitting prime minister is also president of the National Assembly. According to the Legal Service of the Government of Slovenia, positions are compatible, but only for a short period of time.

Before the first session Marjan Šarec stated, that Matej Tonin (NSi) will be nominated for the Speaker by LMŠ, SD, SMC, NSi, SAB and DeSUS.

=== Government formation ===
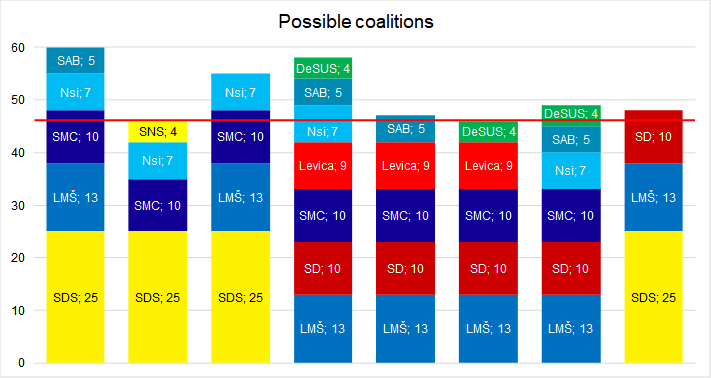
Possible coalitions that have 46 votes (red line)

Pahor announced before the elections that he would grant a mandate to the winner of the elections. On 3 June, he repeated his statement and Janez Janša was granted a mandate to form a coalition government, the third time he had the opportunity to do so, after 2004 and 2012. However, all of the centre-left and left-wing parties (LMŠ, SD, SMC, the Left, SAB and DeSUS) publicly declared that they would not join a government under Janša and the SDS, meaning Janša could only form a minority right-wing government with NSi and SNS, with the support of either LMŠ, SD, SMC or the Left, or court both DeSUS and the centrist list of Alenka Bratušek, in order to win a majority. A centre-to-centre-left government under the leadership of Marjan Šarec was considered more likely to be formed, consisting of LMŠ, SD, SMC, SAB, DeSUS and NSi or the Left, though NSi was seen as more likely to be invited to join the coalition due to the requirement of the Left for any coalition agreements to include a referendum on NATO membership, something strongly opposed by all other parties. Because of the large number of parties, it was expected that it would be difficult to form a government. Some of the political analysts had not ruled out the possibility of new snap elections in November if Šarec failed to form a government.

On 6 June, Marjan Šarec met with Alenka Bratušek, and further meetings with Miro Cerar (SMC) and Dejan Židan (SD) took place on 7 June. Šarec stated that he was willing to accept the mandate to form a government only if there will be a clear will among potential coalition partners to form a government. Dejan Židan (SD) stated that he expected that leaders of the parliamentary groups prepare the outlining of a coalition agreement before meeting with President Pahor to consult about granting Šarec the mandate. Šarec also announced that he would invite all the parties, except SDS, for talks to see what are the possibilities to form a government.

On 7 June, Pahor met with Janša to discuss his possibilities to form a new government. Pahor once again repeated that he was going to grant a mandate to Janša, but Janša said he would not accept the mandate if another 46-seat strong coalition was viable. Janša also did not explicitly rule out the possibility to stand down as potential prime minister-designate and let someone else from his party take the post and form a government. Pahor said that he preferred that the SDS would form a government, as governments formed by parties that did not win elections in the past had been prone to instability, adding governments of Janez Janša (2012) and Alenka Bratušek (2013) as examples. Šarec replied that those two governments cannot be compared with his potential coalition, as Janša's government was removed from the office because of the corruption allegations and Bratušek's government was destabilized by her own party, when Janković had to resign as leader of the party due to corruption allegations as well and Bratušek took over the party. Matjaž Han (SD) said in Tarča (political show on RTVSLO) that Social Democrats would not talk with Janša about forming a coalition, since talks with Šarec had already u.

On 8 June, Marjan Šarec met with Karl Erjavec (DeSUS) to discuss future cooperation. Matej Tonin (NSi) also confirmed talks with Šarec. Meanwhile, SDS was still not commenting on their activities, but Tonin confirmed talks with them as well.

On 12 June, NSi rejected the offered resignation of president Matej Tonin, who offered resignation after the party did not reach 10% of votes in the election, which had been repeatedly stated by Tonin as his goal in the election. The main reason for not accepting his resignation party was stated as that they improved their result and gained 2 new MPs.

Media reported on 14 June that Modern Centre Party (SMC), Party of Alenka Bratušek (SAB) and List of Marjan Šarec (LMŠ) had agreed to merge into an alliance to form a central liberal bloc.

On 15 June, SDS stated that they would draft a coalition treaty which would later be sent to all parliamentary parties as a basis for negotiations. Later that day, DeSUS rejected Karl Erjavec's resignation as president of the party. Erjavec offered his resignation after a poor result in the election, which saw the party lose 5 MPs.

On 26 June Executive Committee of the Modern Centre Party (SMC) expelled Milan Brglez from the party in a unanimous decision for that his self-candidature for Speaker of the National Assembly, since Miro Cerar did not have support of potential coalition partners (LMŠ, SD, NSi, SAB and DeSUS) to become Speaker himself. The executive committee also blamed Brglez that he did not respect the decision of the parties and had been making statements that were opposite to the statements of Cerar and other party officials. As example they added that Cerar supported US missile strikes against Syria earlier in April, while Brglez did not, stating that these acts are against international law and Slovenia's constitution.

On 2 July President Borut Pahor began the first round of consultations with leaders of the political groups in the National Assembly. Danijel Krivec (SDS) said that SDS supported their president Janez Janša as candidate for new prime minister. Brane Golubović (LMŠ) asked President Pahor if he would make another round of consultations on Friday and that they would support giving the mandate to Janez Janša first. Matjaž Han (SD) and Igor Zorčič (SMC) said that they would only support Marjan Šarec as prime minister. Zorčič also said that they could join a coalition with New Slovenia or The Left. Matej Tašner Vatovec (Levica) said that they would not support any of the candidates.

On 16 July, after a meeting of the executive council of New Slovenia (NSi), its president Matej Tonin announced that NSi would withdraw for negotiations to form a government under Šarec. The decision was expected, even after parties negotiated for almost 12 hours on 14 July to finalize the coalition agreement. Šarec stated after negotiations that they were successful and that significant progress had been made.

After Matej Tonin (NSi) announced on 24 July that NSi would not further negotiate to form coalition under LMŠ, Marjan Šarec (LMŠ) announced next day that central parties LMŠ, SD, SMC, SAB and DeSUS would begin official coalition negotiations with The Left. Coordinator of The Left Luka Mesec confirmed that the party had received an invitation for negotiations. On 31 June, Levica refused to join the coalition but was prepared to support a minority government.

On 2 August, Miro Cerar sent a message to members of SMC in which he expressed his doubt about stability of a minority government that could be formed, however he still stressed that they support Šarec as new prime minister. It was also reported that The Left presented a project of the government coalition of what they wanted it to look like, which did not have any ministries reserved for the Party of Alenka Bratušek, so the SAB decided they would not join a minority government with their proposed-ministers, but would support the government from the opposition in order to achieve a minority government with the backing from The Left.

On 6 August, Marjan Šarec has said he expected to get the mandate of forming a minority coalition. Later on 7 August, it was said that on the 8th of August, the LMŠ, SD, SMC, SAB, and DeSUS would “endorse the nomination of Marjan Šarec as PM-designate” and that there would be a vote on 13 August. Mr. Šarec was also hoping that The Left will also endorse his nomination. It had been said that the five parties wanted the SD leader, Dejan Židan, to be named speaker, if the coalition is formed, although it was not a requirement for the SD to join the coalition, as it is a “tradition for the job to go to the second-largest coalition partner,” which would be the Social Democrats.

These positions were claimed by some of the leaders of the parties as their conditions to join coalition:

Party	Claimed position	Candidate
LMŠ	Minister of Finance	Vojmir Urlep
SAB	Minister of Finance; Minister of Foreign Affairs; Governor of Central Bank	Alenka Bratušek
SD	Minister of Economy	Dejan Židan
SMC	Speaker of the National Assembly	Miro Cerar
SMC	Minister of Infrastructure	Peter Gašperšič
NSi	Minister of Health; Minister without portfolio for Slovene diaspora	Matjaž Trontelj Matej Tonin
DeSUS	One of the ministries for Finance, Interior, Foreign Affairs or Defence	Karl Erjavec
SNS	Minister of Culture	Zmago Jelinčič Plemeniti

A government was finally formed on 13 September by a LMS-SD-SMC-SAB-DeSUS coalition with support from Levica.
