= Voice for Children and Families =

Slovenian political party

Voice for Children and Families Glas za otroke in družine
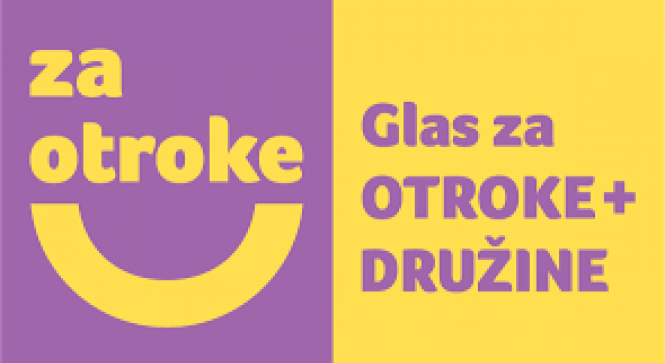
- Leader: Aleš Primc
- Founders: Aleš Primc and Metka Zevnik
- Founded: 25 March 2017
- Headquarters: Stari trg 11a 1000 Ljubljana
- Ideology: Christian democracy Political Catholicism; Social conservatism Populism
- Political position: Right-wing
- National Assembly: 0 / 90
- European Parliament: 0 / 8

Website
- http://www.zaotrokeindruzine.si/

The Voice for Children and Families (Slovene: Glas za otroke in družine, short name ZA OTROKE!) is a right-wing Slovenian political party. The party was founded on 25 March 2017 by Aleš Primc and Metka Zevnik as an electoral arm of a movement of which they are also leaders of, the Movement for Children and Families, the initial purpose of which was to overturn a law passed by the National Assembly which would recognize same sex marriage in the Republic of Slovenia.

== Background ==
The Movement, first called "Coalition For the Children!", collected a sufficient number of signatures to declare a referendum challenging the new Marriage and Family Relations Act, as per article 90 of the Slovenia's constitution. The law was subsequently rejected when the referendum was held on 20 December 2015. Primc had since proposed an alternative law, which would grant more legal rights to same-sex couples, but would not recognize same-sex marriage or put same-sex couples them on an equal footing with opposite-sex couples regarding adoption. The Movement has also proposed a law aimed mainly at prioritizing grandparents regarding adoption of children whose biological parents are deceased. The intention to derive an electoral arm of the movement was hinted at subsequent to the referendum victory and officially announced on 14 January 2017.

The political party held its founding convention on 25 March 2017 in Škofja Loka. Aleš Primc was unanimously elected as party leader. Multiple prominent party officials stated that they expect divine assistance.

In February 2018, it was revealed that the party would be joining forces with former Maribor mayor Franc Kangler's New People's Party of Slovenia to form United Right, an electoral alliance, to jointly contest the upcoming 2018 Slovene parliamentary election. After it became obvious that the party's/coalition's electoral effort would end up a flop, Primc declared the party was no longer contesting the election and directed the party's voters to instead vote for "SDS or some other party of the Slovenian spring that has a chance to enter parliament".

== Political alignment and ties ==
Primc has stated that he is willing to work with all parties where there is common ground, but that he sees himself closer to the two conservative parliamentary parties; Slovene Democratic Party and New Slovenia.

Primc also serves as president of "Committee 2014" (Slovene: "Odbor 2014"), an organization which mainly organized protests in front of the Supreme Court of the Republic of Slovenia, the central demand being the pardon of former prime minister and leader of the Slovene Democratic Party Janez Janša and others (allegedly wrongly) convicted of corruption in the Patria case. Primc is also a founding member, has a seat on the board of, and is a frequent guest and contributor on Nova24TV, a media company which has deep ties to SDS.

There has been speculation that the party will serve as a "satellite" of the largest parliamentary conservative party, the Slovene Democratic Party, as a part of its effort to politically and electorally undermine the other parliamentary conservative party, New Slovenia, for its perceived disloyalty (the parties had previously partnered in coalition governments and shared political ties, but have since seen a schism and a cooling of relations with NSi leadership stating that the two parties cannot work together as long as Janez Janša remains as leader of SDS).

== Ideology and Platform ==
The 38 point party platform principally advocates a return to traditional and Christian values (the first point of the summary states a need to a return to "the respect of life, motherhood and fatherhood, Slovene culture, work, Sunday's rest, and Christianity"), binary gender identity and a traditional marriage and family structure. It states that any infraction into the life of unborn children, the old and the sick is unacceptable and rejects euthanasia and assisted suicide, advocating for free palliative care instead. It states that Slovenia's pension system and culture can survive only with a higher birth rate, which should be pursued. All workers deserve a fair wage that is adequate for a decent living. A favorable economic environment should be created to battle emigration of young people who lack job opportunities in the country and also as a more favorable alternative to a welfare state. More attention should be given to the agricultural periphery. A fairer judiciary should be pursued to better grapple crime. The platform also states that there should be "self-defense" training mandatory for boys (with an option of community service for conscientious objectors) and optional for girls, and that a military and police reserve should be established.

The platform also states that the greatest danger to society are people who have political and social power and think and act as to be God, but there is only one God, that the phrase "unborn child" should be used instead of embryo and foetus, that Sunday should be a work-free day for everyone whose work responsibility isn't essential, and that all state-owned enterprises that are structurally and economically important should remain state-owned and run responsibly and profitably, with an amendment added to the constitution that anyone found guilty of corruption or damaging the assets of state-owned companies should be forbidden from doing business with the state or managing state property for life. It is also stated that the party respects the traditional left and their advocacy of worker rights, but that it has been supplanted by militant atheism and hatred of the different-minded. It states that everyone has a right to refuse service on the basis of one's beliefs. Private medical practice should more readily be accommodated into the public healthcare system. Measures to curb all types of addictions, including to pornography and computer games, should be introduced. Asylum for Christian refugees should be prioritized.

During the founding convention (though this was reported only by a single source), it was also stated that the party would, among other measures, seek to bestow voting rights to children aged 14 and older (though only if under supervision of their parents), and multiple votes to parents; one vote for every child under the aforementioned age (though it was not specified how the votes would be divided among the children's parents). The purpose of this measure would ostensibly be to encourage higher birth rates.

Angelca Likovič, who has represented the Movement in various TV appearances, has stated that "We are fighting so that our descendants have Slovene roots, and that is why we encourage all mothers to give birth, even the ones who were raped." The movement subsequently awarded Likovič a "White Rose" award for her "untiring fight for the rights of unborn children".

== Electoral history ==
| Election | Votes | % | Seats | +/– | Position | Government |
|---|---|---|---|---|---|---|
| 2018 | 2,064 | 0.23 | 0 / 90 | ▲ | ▲22 | |
