= Milan Balažic =

Slovenian academic

Milan Balažic Ambassador
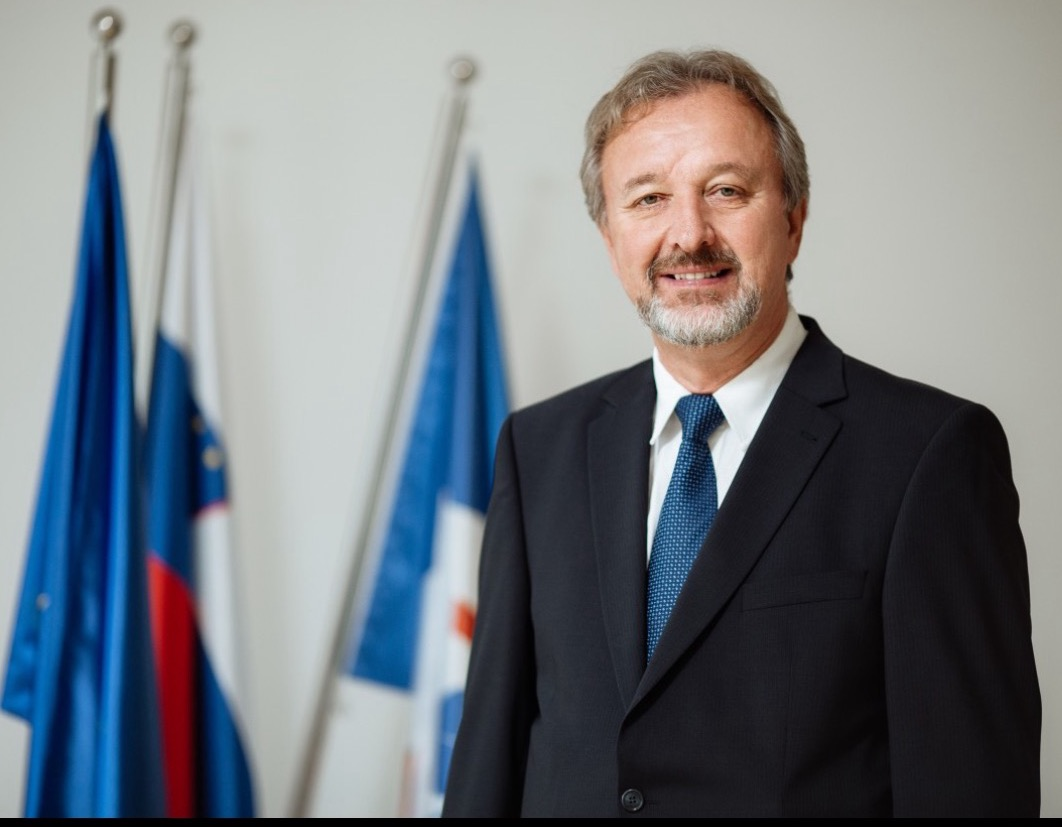

Personal details
- Born: 19 October 1958 (age 68) Ljubljana, Yugoslavia
- Education: Faculty of Social Sciences, University of Ljubljana

Milan Balažic (born 19 October 1958) is a Slovenian political theorist, politician and diplomat.

== Early life ==
Balažic was born in Ljubljana, Slovenia, then part of former Yugoslavia, to a family originating from Prekmurje. In 1985 he graduated in political science from the University of Ljubljana, with the thesis The critic of scientific objectivism: monopoly capital and revolutionary subject. In 1994 he obtained his PhD under the supervision of Rastko Močnik, analysing the approaches of Frankfurt School and Lacan's psychoanalysis to the social and political field.

As a student, he was the editor-in-chief of the student paper Tribuna and a member of the editorial board of the Journal for the Criticism of Science.

== Political career ==
In the period of the Slovene Spring Balažic was a member of the Alliance of Socialist Youth of Slovenia, the autonomous branch of the Communist Party. At the time of the JBTZ trial he acted as its representative in the Igor Bavčar's Committee for the Defence of Human Rights. He was the vice president of the League of Communists of Slovenia where he led, together with Borut Pahor the pro-reformist wing which advocated social-democratisation of the party, immediate implementation of democracy, joining the European Union and independent Slovenia. Later he became a member of the ruling Liberal Democracy of Slovenia. In the 1992 Slovenian parliamentary election, he was elected a member of the National Assembly of Slovenia. During the 10-day war in Slovenia he attended the parliamentary sessions wearing the military uniform of the territorial defence forces. In 2016 he established the political movement The New Future.

== Diplomacy ==
In 1996 Balažic continued his career in diplomacy. At the Ministry of Foreign Affairs (Slovenia) he held the position of an undersecretary of state and acted as the head of the Department for Analysis and Development. He was the founder of the first Slovenian diplomatic academy. In 2008 he took the position of state secretary for strategic affairs and the Ministry's official spokesman.

Between 2011 and 2014 he served as the Ambassador of the Republic of Slovenia to Australia, New Zealand, Indonesia and Association of Southeast Asian Nations. President Pahor recalled him in June 2014 due to the presence of convicted paedophile Nicholas Oman at the opening of the consulate in Melbourne in March 2014, which upset the Australian Slovenian community. Balažic said that Prime Minister Alenka Bratušek had engaged him to conduct secret diplomatic activities related to Oman, but Bratušek denied this.

== Academic career ==
Between 1999 and 2011 Balažic was a professor in a political science and the head of the Department of Political Science at the University of Ljubljana. He also lectured at universities and diplomatic academies in Europe, Asia and Australia. His academic work can generally be categorised as politically philosophical and psychoanalytically epistemological. The first part of his writing is predominantly dedicated to the analysis of the era of Slovenian democratisation and independence, whereas the second part addresses the influence of psychoanalysis on social sciences.

Balažic is also a political commentator and columnist in a daily papers and magazines. The main thread is his support for social sustainability, liberal reforms, deregulation and privatisation.

== Personal life ==
Balažic is an active tennis player, mountaineer and guitarist. He was a bass player in the cult Slovenian punk rock band Lublanski psi. He is also the author of two books of poetry.

Since 2006 Balažic has been in a relationship with the Lacanian psychoanalyst and philosopher Nina Krajnik.

== Bibliography ==
- Gospostvo (Domination), 1995
- Čudežna zgodbica: pesmi (Miraculous Little Story: Poems), 1997
- Ranjena žival: nove pesmi (Wounded Animal: New Poems), 1998
- Slovenska demokratična revolucija (Slovenian Democratic Revolution), 2004
- Slovenski berlinski zid (Slovenian Berlin Wall), 2006
- Psihoanaliza politike (Psychoanalysis of Politics), 2007
- Politična antifilozofija (Political Antiphilosophy), 2007
- Znanost in realno (Science and the Real), 2008
- Rojstvo slovenske demokracije (Birth of Slovenian Democracy), 2010
- Slovenski plebiscit (Slovenian Plebiscite), 2010
- Samostojna Slovenija (Independent Slovenia), 2011
