= New People's Party of Slovenia =

New People's Party of Slovenia Nova ljudska stranka Slovenije
- Leader: Željko Vogrin
- Founder: Franc Kangler
- Founded: 12 May 2016
- Dissolved: 2023
- Split from: Slovenian People's Party
- Merged into: Slovenian Democratic Party
- Headquarters: Maribor
- Ideology: Conservatism; Agrarianism
- Political position: Centre-right
- National affiliation: Let's Connect Slovenia
- National Assembly: 0 / 90
- European Parliament: 0 / 8
- Municipal council: 10 / 2,750

Website
- http://nls.si/

The New People's Party of Slovenia (Slovene: Nova ljudska stranka Slovenije, NLS) was a political party in Slovenia. The party, which evolved from the so-called "Mayor's list" (Slovene: Županova lista), was founded on 12 May 2016 by former Maribor mayor, Franc Kangler.

In February 2018, it was revealed that NLS would be joining forces with the party Voice for Children and Families to form United Right, an electoral alliance, to jointly contest the upcoming 2018 Slovenian parliamentary election.

The party, along with Voice for Children and Families, was said to function as a "satellite" of the largest conservative party in Slovenia, the Slovenian Democratic Party, since it could enable it to form a coalition of loyal, seemingly independent parties. The party ultimately merged into the Slovenian Democratic Party.

== Electoral results ==
=== National Assembly ===
Election	Leader	Votes	%	Seats	+/–	Government
2018 (Note: Run within United Right coalition (ZO-NLS).)	Franc Kangler	2,141	0.24 (#22)	0 / 90	New	Extra-parliamentary
2022 (Note: Run within Let's Connect Slovenia coalition.)	Željko Vogrin	40,612	3.41 (#7)	0 / 90	0	Extra-parliamentary
