= Andrej Čuš =

Slovenian politician (born 1990)

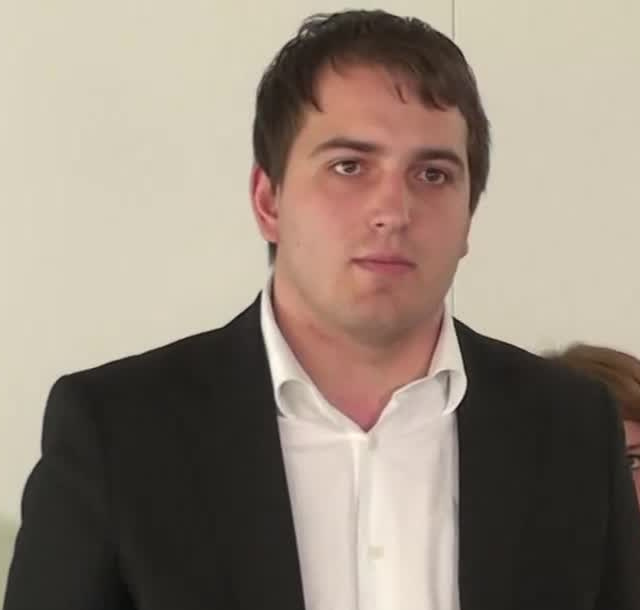
- Čuš in 2012

Member of the National Assembly
- In office 4 February 2013 – 22 June 2018
- Preceded by: Branko Marinič
- Constituency: Ptuj – Ptuj 1

Personal details
- Born: 27 July 1990 (age 35)
- Party: Greens of Slovenia (since 2017)
- Other political affiliations: Slovenian Democratic Party (until 2016)

Andrej Čuš (born 27 July 1990) is a Slovenian politician serving as leader of the Greens of Slovenia since 2018. From 2013 to 2018, he was a member of the National Assembly. He was a member of the Slovenian Democratic Party until 2016, and served as leader of the Slovenian Democratic Youth from 2011 to 2015.
