= Next Slovenian parliamentary election =

- On or before 22 March 2030

All 90 seats in the National Assembly 46 seats needed for a majority
- Opinion polls
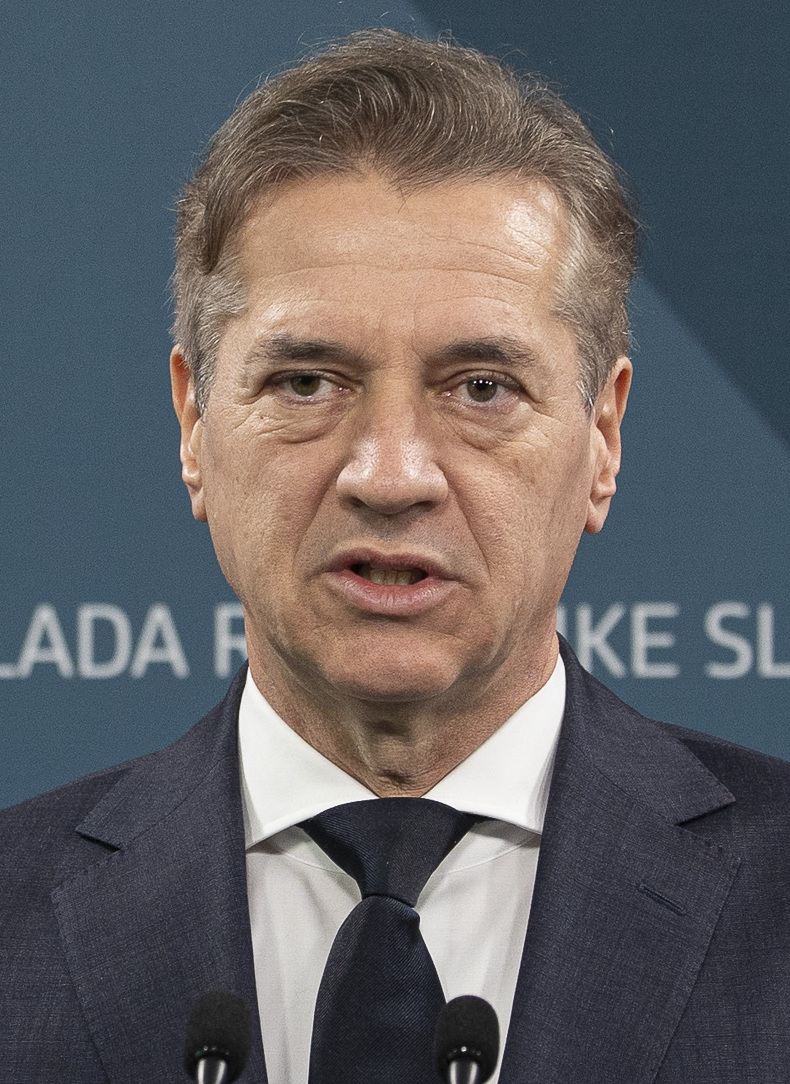

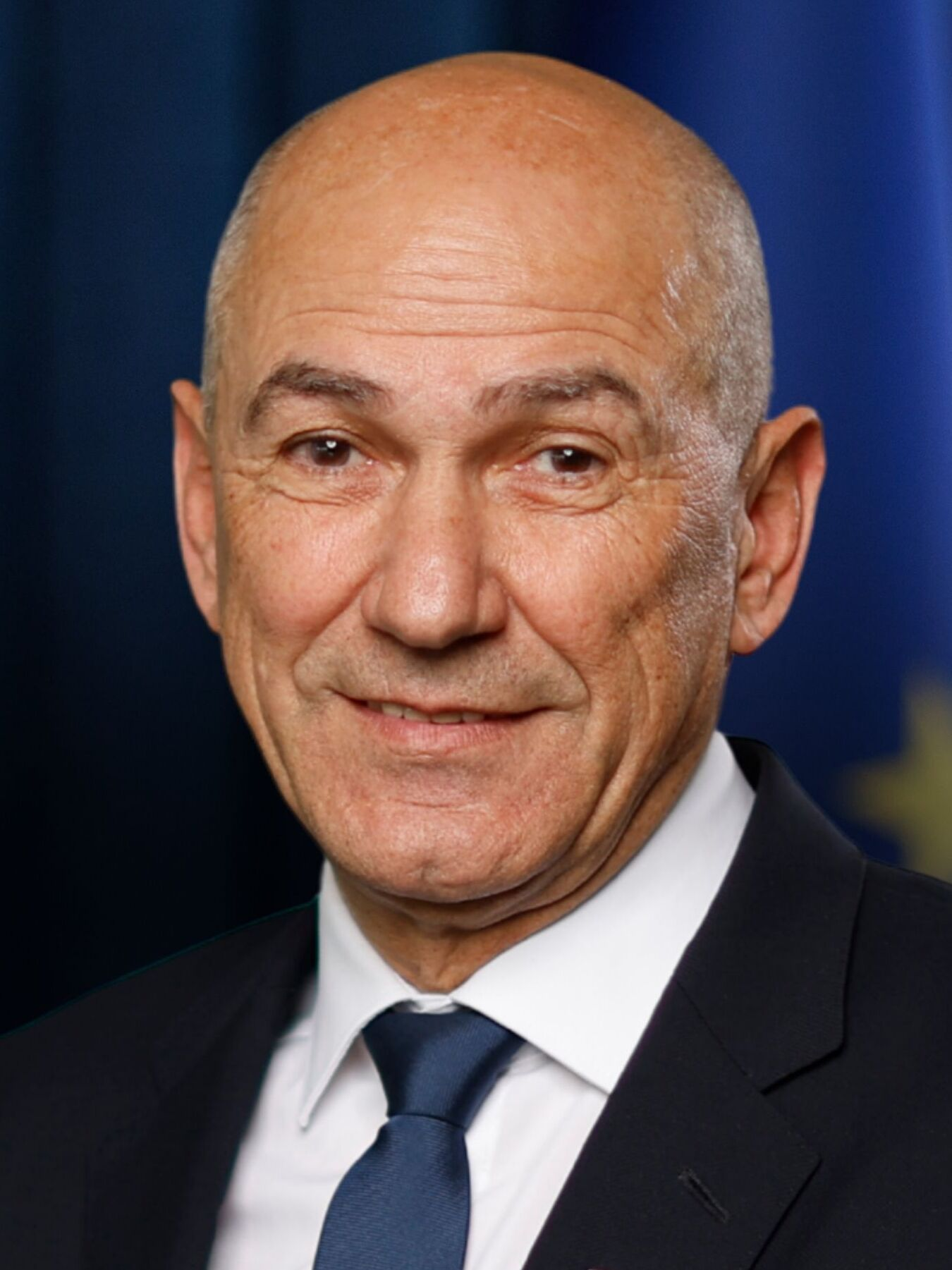

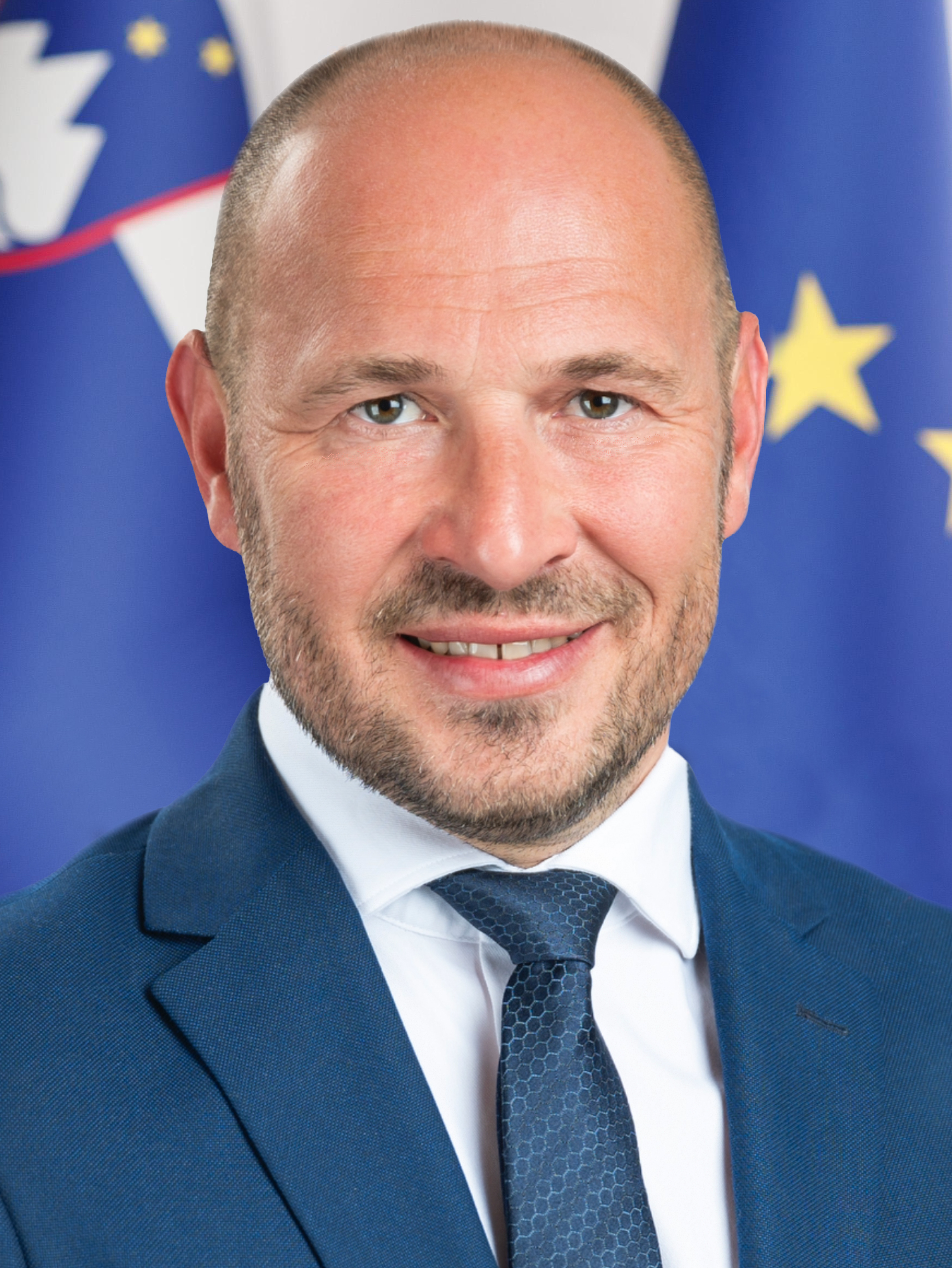

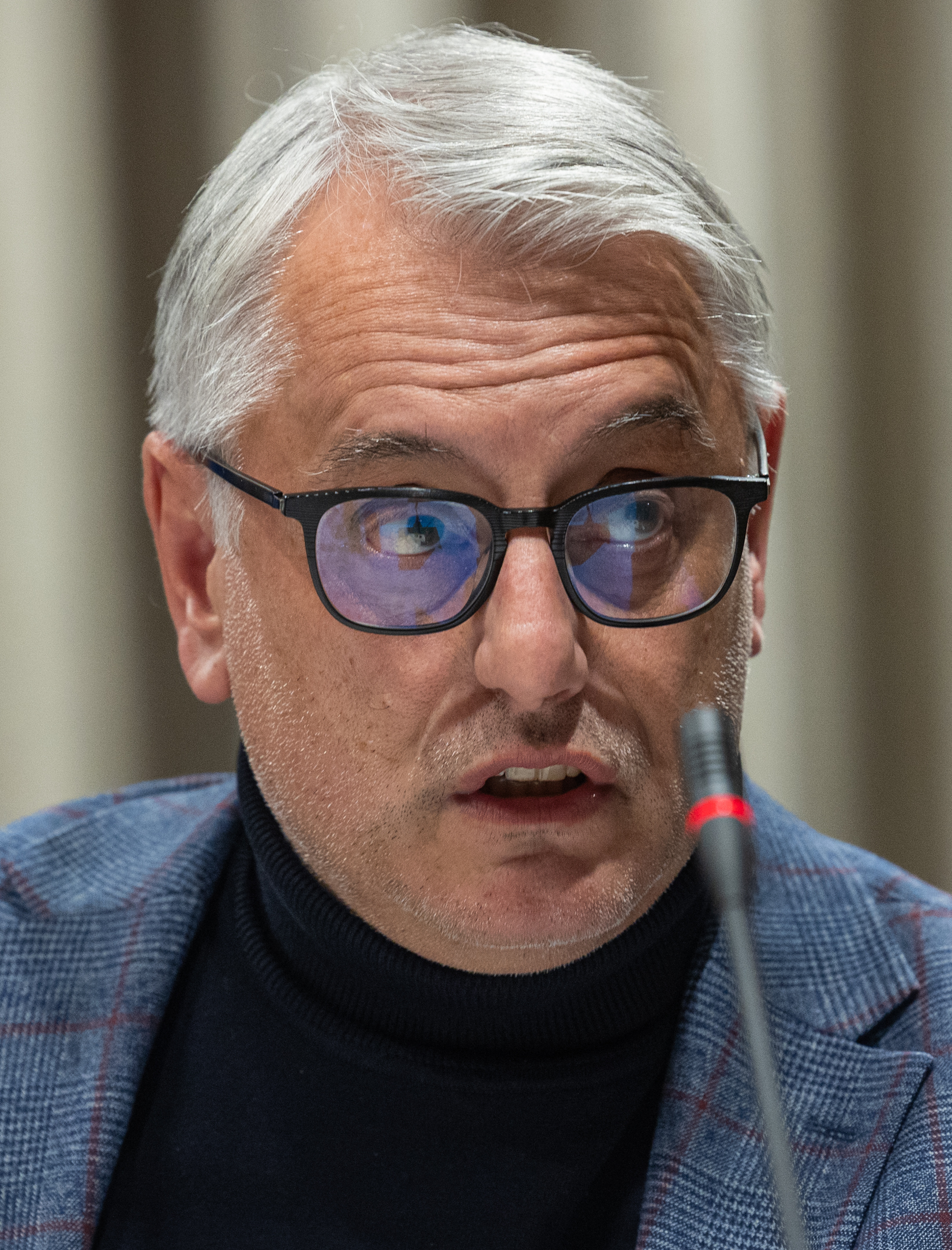

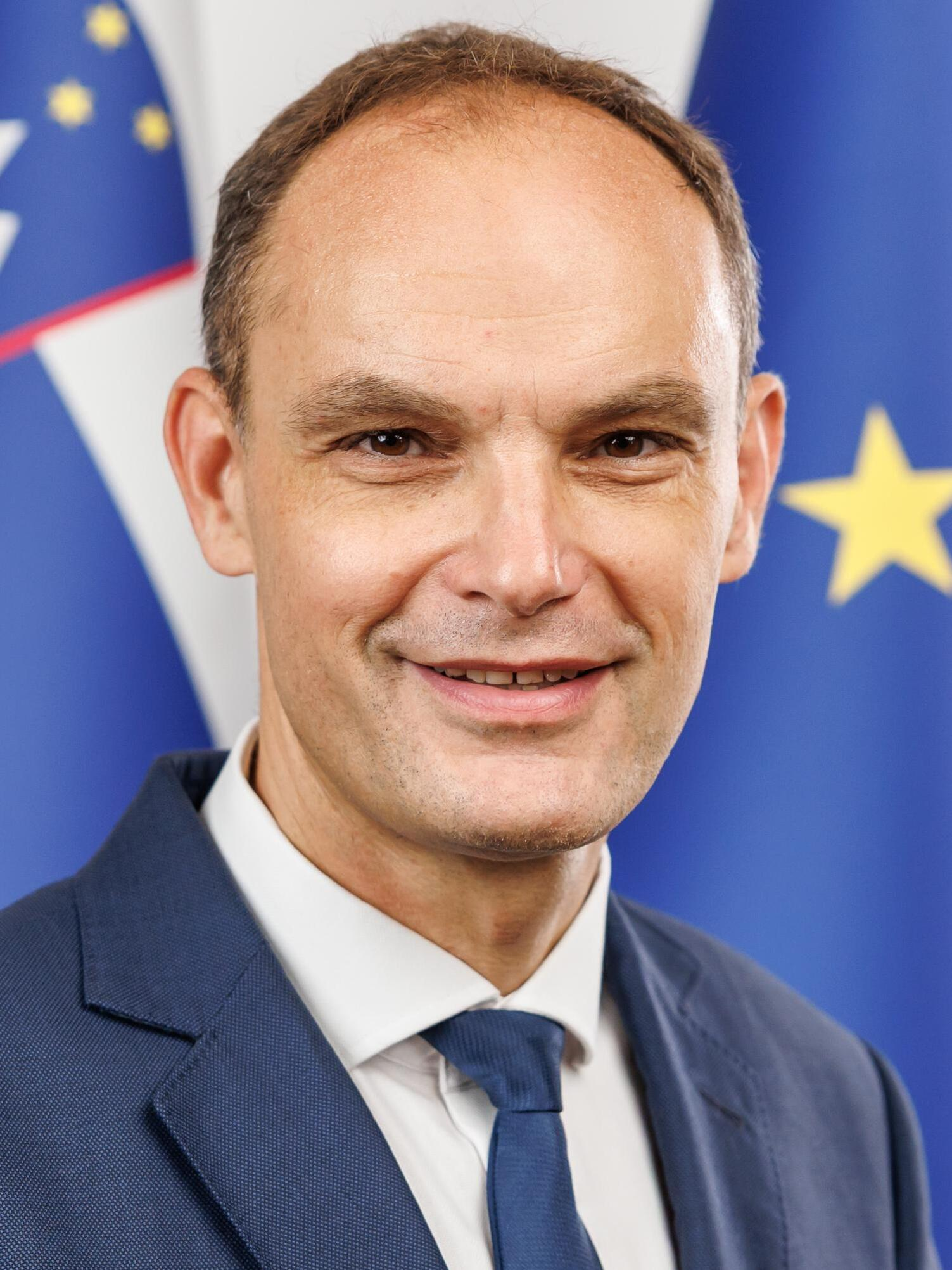

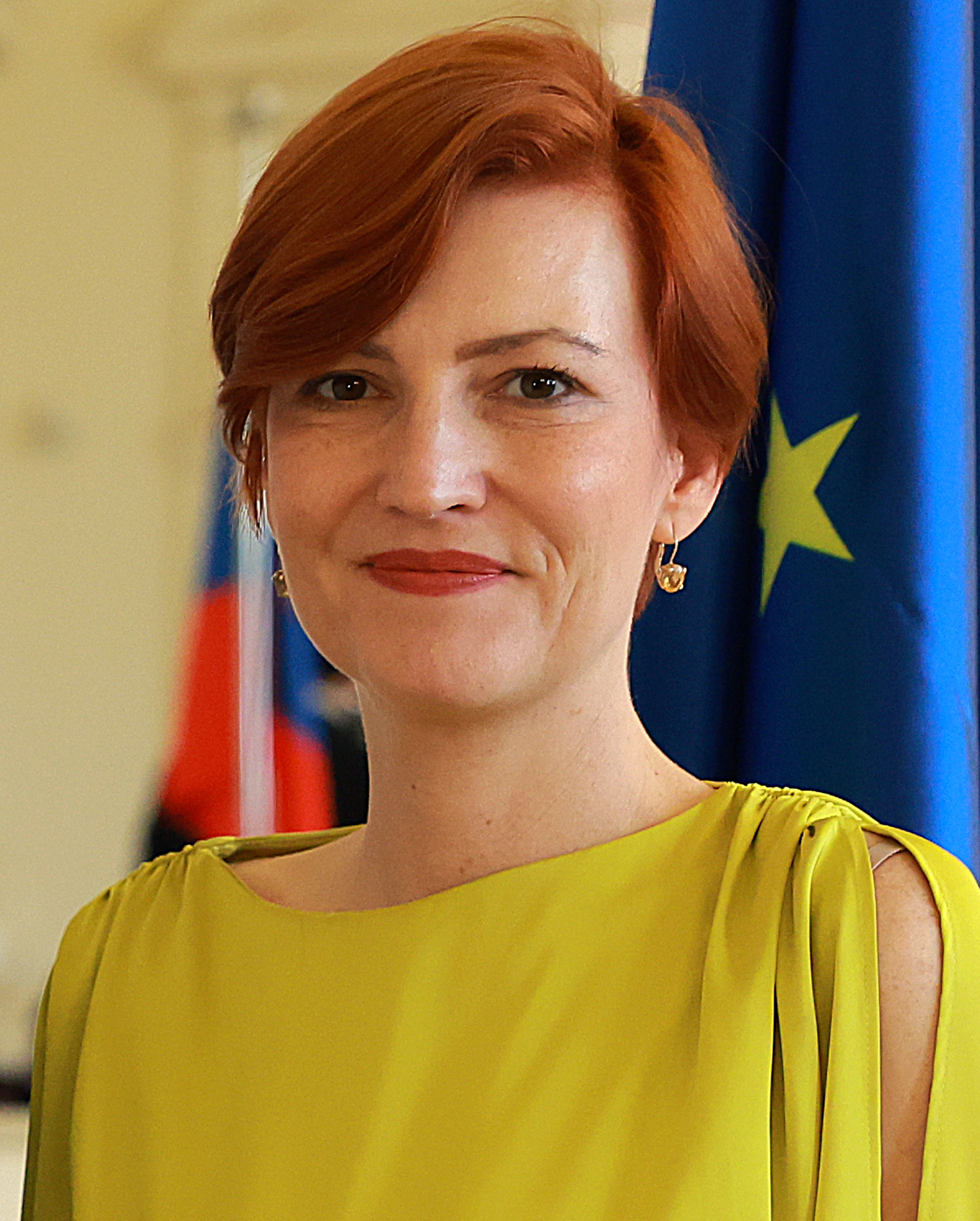

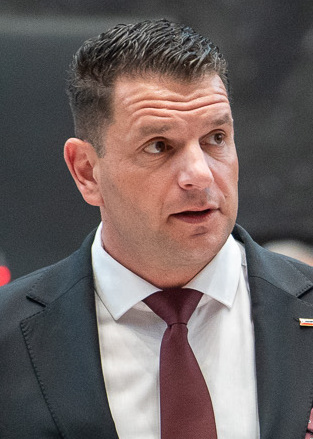

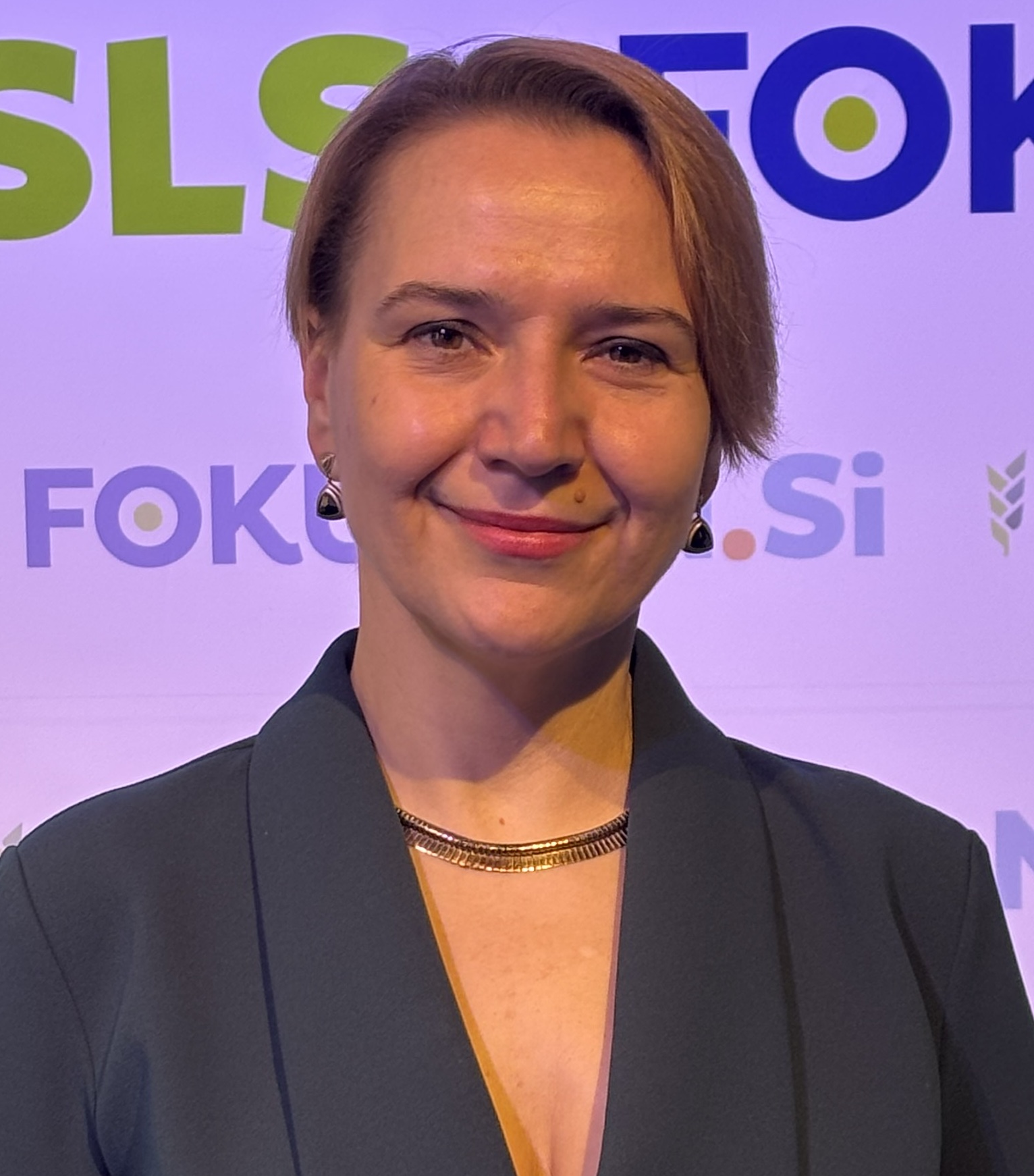

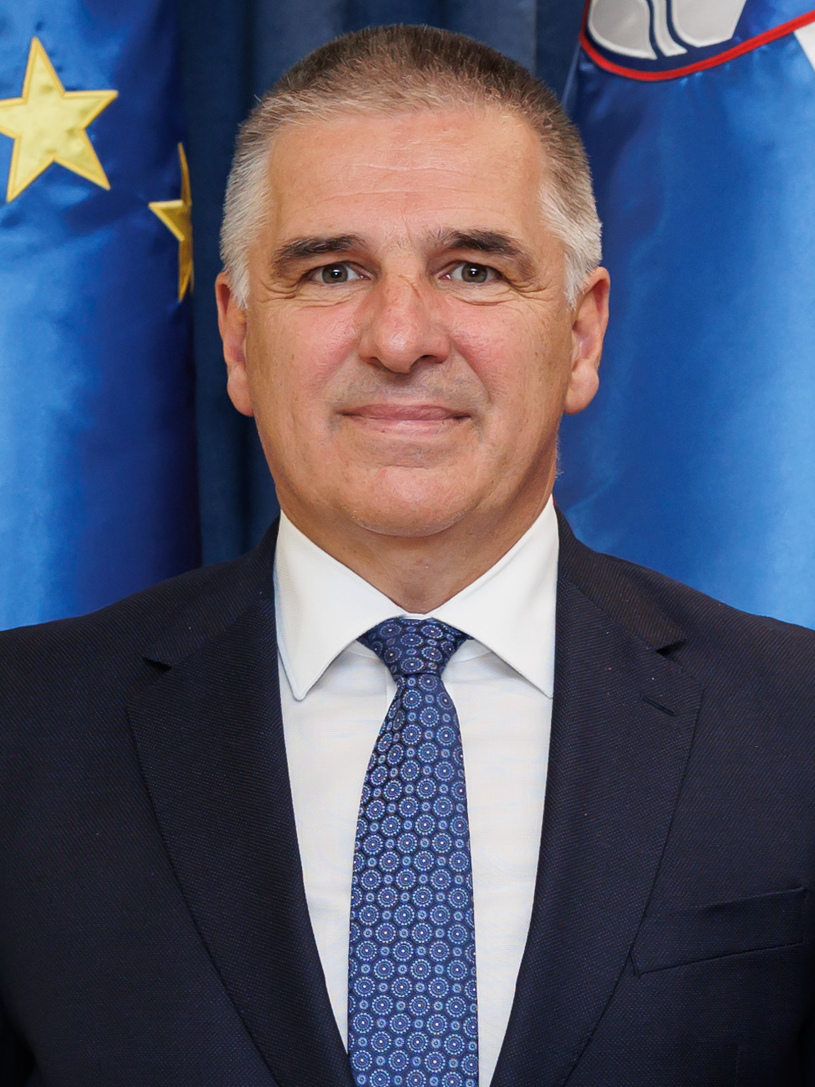
Leader	Robert Golob	Janez Janša	Jernej Vrtovec
Party	GS	SDS	NSi
Alliance			SA
Leader since	26 January 2022	15 May 1993	13 September 2025
Leader's seat	Ljubljana Bežigrad I	Grosuplje	Ajdovščina
Last election	28.66%, 29 seats	27.88%, 28 seats	5.54%, 7 seats (Note: As their share on the N.Si, SLS, FOKUS alliance. Stojan Auer was a candidate with support from all three parties, his vote tally isn't included anywhere.)
Current seats	29	28	7
Leader	Matjaž Han	Anže Logar	Asta Vrečko & Luka Mesec
Party	SD	Democrats	Levica
Leader since	16 April 2024	16 November 2024	13 November 2025
Leader's seat	Laško	Ran in Logatec (lost)	Ljubljana Bežigrad II & Ljubljana Center
Last election	6.71%, 6 seats	6.69%, 6 seats	3.80%, 5 seats (Note: As Levica's share of votes on the Levica and Vesna alliance.)
Current seats	6	6	5
Leader	Zoran Stevanović	Tina Bregant	Marko Lotrič
Party	Resni.ca	SLS	FOKUS
Alliance		SA	SA
Leader since	14 January 2021	26 April 2025	18 January 2025
Leader's seat	Kranj II	Ran in Ptuj III (lost)	None (Note: Lotrič denied running on the N.Si, SLS, FOKUS alliance, instead wanting to finish the job as the president of the National Council.)
Last election	5.49%, 5 seats	2.24%, 1 seat	1.40%, 1 seat
Current seats	3	1	1
Incumbent Prime Minister
Janez Janša
SDS

Parliamentary elections will be held in Slovenia on or before 22 March 2030. The elections will determine the composition of the National Assembly, which determines the government of Slovenia.

== Background ==
The 2026 Slovenian parliamentary election held on 22 March resulted in a close victory for the liberal Freedom Movement, led by Prime Minister Robert Golob. The party won 28.7% of the vote and 29 seats, narrowly edging the Slovenian Democratic Party of former Prime Minister Janez Janša. Third place with nine MPs was taken by NSi, SLS, FOKUS alliance, followed by Social Democrats and Democrats with six MPs, Levica in Vesna alliance and Resni.ca with five MPs. Compared to the previous election the number of parties in the parliament rose from 5 to 7. On 22 May Janez Janša became the prime minister for the fourth time and on 4 June fourth Janša government was confirmed.

== Date of the election ==
Under the Constitution of the Republic of Slovenia and the National Assembly Elections Act (Zakon o volitvah v državni zbor), the President of Slovenia issues a decree calling parliamentary elections. Regular elections must be called no earlier than 135 days and no later than 60 days before the end of the Assembly’s term, and voting must occur no later than two months before its expiry. Once the decree is published in the Official Gazette, formal electoral procedures begin, including the appointment of electoral bodies and updates to voter registration.

Candidate lists must be submitted no later than 30 days before election day, with constituency electoral commissions verifying them within five days. Campaigning is regulated by the Elections and Referendum Campaign Act, which imposes a 48-hour electoral silence before polls open.

If the National Assembly is dissolved early, such as following the failure to elect a Prime Minister or a successful vote of no confidence. The President must call a snap election within 60 days. The new term begins with the Assembly’s first session after the vote. For the 2026 parliamentary election, the presidential decree was issued on 6 January 2026, setting the vote for 22 March 2026.

== Electoral system ==
=== Voting eligibility ===
Citizens of Slovenia who are at least 18 years old on election day are eligible to vote in elections to the National Assembly. Voting rights are universal and equal for all eligible citizens, regardless of social, ethnic, economic, or political affiliation. Individuals deprived of legal capacity by a court decision due to an inability to understand the purpose of elections may be excluded. Slovenian citizens residing abroad also retain voting rights. They may vote by post or at diplomatic and consular missions if they notify authorities within the prescribed deadlines.

Voter registration is automatic and based on the central population register maintained by the Ministry of the Interior. Electoral rolls are compiled 15 days before election day and list voters by their permanent or last registered residence. Voters must cast their ballots at the polling station assigned to them unless eligible for special voting arrangements, such as OMNIA stations for individuals who have changed residence after the roll compilation.

Voting takes place by secret ballot, and Slovenia does not require compulsory voting. Proxy voting is prohibited, except in cases of certified disability where legally defined assistance is permitted. In-person voting is held on election day from 7:00 to 19:00, while limited postal voting is available for hospitalized, detained, or temporarily absent voters who notify the State Election Commission in advance. Members of the Italian and Hungarian national communities possess additional voting rights, enabling them to elect their own representatives in dedicated single-member constituencies, in addition to voting for the remaining 88 deputies under the general system.

=== Voting method and seat allocation ===
The National Assembly consists of 90 members. Of these, 88 are elected through open list proportional representation across eight constituencies, each electing 11 deputies. The remaining two seats are reserved for the Italian and Hungarian minority communities, elected using the plurality voting method. Political parties or lists must surpass the national 4% electoral threshold to qualify for seat allocation. Within each constituency, seats are distributed using the Droop quota method. Voters may cast a preferential vote for a candidate on a party list, influencing the order of election within that list. Remaining seats after constituency allocation are distributed at the national level using the D'Hondt method to maintain proportionality. Although Slovenia is divided into 88 electoral districts, not all districts necessarily elect a deputy, as multiple deputies may be elected from some districts depending on list performance.

Gender quotas apply to candidate lists: at least 35% of candidates must be from each gender, except on three-candidate lists, which must include at least one candidate of each gender.As of October 2026, no amendments had yet been made to the proportional representation system, and the electoral framework remained unchanged from previous elections, despite a non-binding referendum in June 2024 approving the introduction of the preferential vote and ongoing public and political calls for electoral reform.In June 2026, the opposition parties Freedom Movement, Social Democrats and Levica and Vesna proposed introducing a preferential-vote system based on 18 electoral constituencies, each electing five deputies, replacing the current system of 88 electoral districts within eight constituencies, though the proposal had not been enacted.

== Parties and coalitions ==
=== Parties in Parliament ===
The following parties and lists have seats in the current National Assembly before the election:

Name			Ideology	Position	Leader	Seats	
Name			Ideology	Position	Leader	2026 election	Before the election
GS	Freedom Movement; Gibanje Svoboda		Social liberalism	Centre to centre-left	Robert Golob	29 / 90	29 / 90
SDS	Slovenian Democratic Party; Slovenska demokratska stranka		National conservatism	Right-wing	Janez Janša	28 / 90	28 / 90
SA	NSi	New Slovenia – Christian Democrats; Nova Slovenija – Krščanski demokrati	Christian democracy	Centre-right	Jernej Vrtovec	7 / 90	7 / 90
SA	SLS	Slovenian People's Party; Slovenska ljudska stranka	Agrarianism	Centre-right	Tina Bregant	1 / 90	1 / 90
SA	FOKUS	Focus of Marko Lotrič; Fokus Marka Lotriča	Conservatism	Centre-right	Marko Lotrič	1 / 90	1 / 90
SD	Social Democrats; Socialni demokrati		Social democracy	Centre-left	Matjaž Han	6 / 90	6 / 90
DEM	Democrats; Demokrati Anžeta Logarja		Conservative liberalism	Centre-right	Anže Logar	6 / 90	6 / 90
L	The Left; Levica		Democratic socialism	Left-wing	Asta Vrečko; Luka Mesec	5 / 90	5 / 90
RES	Tru.th; Resni.ca		Populism	Right-wing	Zoran Stevanović	5 / 90	3 / 90
NEP	Independent MPs; Nepovezani poslanci				Katja Kokot; Aleksander Štorek	0 / 90	2 / 90
IMNS	MPs of Italian and Hungarian national communities Poslanca Italijanske in Madžarske narodne skupnosti				Ferenc Horváth; Felice Žiža	2 / 90	2 / 90

==== Seat changes ====
- On 26 May 2026, Maruša Babnik replaced Janez Janša as a Member of Parliament after Janša was elected Prime Minister of Slovenia.
- On 9 June 2026, Janez Beja, Andrej Černigoj, Luka Simonič and Dejan Zakrajšek replaced Janez Cigler Kralj, Suzana Lep Šimenko, Tadej Ostrc and Jernej Vrtovec as Members of Parliament after they were chosen to be ministers of Agriculture, Slovenians abroad, Health and Infrastructure respectively.
- On 15 June 2026, Ana Cajhen and Elena Zavadlav Ušaj replaced Tea Košir and Barbara Levstik Šega as Members of Parliament after they were chosen to be national secretaries.
- On 12 October 2026, Boris Mijić resigned following a series of scandals. He was succeeded by Martina Haring, who assumed the parliamentary seat after four candidates ranked ahead of her on the electoral list declined the position.
- On 19 November 2026, Katja Kokot and Aleksander Štorek left Resni.ca due to disagreements on party's future and continued as independent MPs.

=== Other parties ===
List of non-parliamentary parties contesting the election
Name		Ideology	Position	Leader/s	2026 Result
V	Vesna – Green Party; Vesna – Zelena stranka	Green politics	Centre-left	Urša Zgojznik; Uroš Macerl	5,7% (Note: In a coalition with Levica, as Levica and Vesna.)
PVP	Prerod – Party of Vladimir Prebilič; Prerod – Stranka Vladimirja Prebiliča	Social liberalism	Centre-left	Vladimir Prebilič	3,1%
PIR	Pirate Party of Slovenia; Piratska stranka Slovenije	Pirate politics	Syncretic	Jasmin Feratović	2,4%
SNS	Slovenian National Party; Slovenska nacionalna stranka	Nationalism	Far-right	Zmago Jelinčič Plemeniti	2,2%
MI!	We, Socialists! Mi, socialisti!	Socialism	Far-left	Miha Kordiš	0,5%
ZS	Greens of Slovenia; Zeleni Slovenije	Green conservatism	Centre-right	Andrej Čuš	0,5%
SG	Party of Generations; Stranka Generacij	Social liberalism	Centre-left	Darinka Mravljak	0,5%
ZD	For a Healthy Society; Za zdravo družbo	Non-ideologic		Jure Pogačnik	0,4%
NOT	None of This; Nič od tega	Noneoftheaboveism	Political satire	Boris Žulj; Violeta Tomić	0,4%
SUV	Suvereni; Suvereni	National liberalism	Right-wing	Dejan Kaloh	0,3% (Note: Ran on a Karl Erjavec - Trust Party ticket, with the party since being deleted from official party register.)
SLOGA	Unity; Sloga	Liberalism	Centre	Janko Veber	0,0%
SUS	Solution – Party of Pensioners Velenje, Slovenia; Rešitev – Stranka upokojencev Velenje, Slovenija	Pensioners interests	Right-wing	Faruk Pijuković	0,0%
KNS	The Guard - Catholic National Party; Straža - Katoliška narodna stranka	Ethnic nationalism	Far-right	Alen Koman	New
TBD	To be determined Še ni določeno	Liberalism	Centre-left	Anton Rop; Urška Klakočar Zupančič	New
VOLT	Volt Slovenia; Volt Slovenija	European federalism	Centre-left	Borja Ranzinger	New

== Opinion polls ==
Opinion polling for the next Slovenian parliamentary election is being carried out continually by various organisations to gauge voting intention. The dates for these opinion polls range from the 2026 Parliamentary election on 22 March to the present day.

=== Polling aggregations ===
Polling aggregator	Last update	GS	SDS	SA	SD	DEM	L	RES	PVP	PIR	SNS	Lead
Odmev	19 November 2026	24.0	29.3	12.4	9.5	4.9	8.7	–	–	–	–	5.3
PolitPro	19 November 2026	23.0	28.4	11.6	10.3	4.6	9.3	2.7	3.0	3.2	1.8	5.4
Politico	5 November 2026	24	28	11	10	5	9	3	3	3	2	4
Europe Elects	24 October 2026	24.5	28.6	10.3	11.4	4.0	9.8	3.3	2.1	–	–	4.1
2026 Election	22 March 2026	28.7; 29	27.9; 28	9.3; 9	6.7; 6	6.7; 6	5.6; 5	5.5; 5	3.1; 0	2.4; 0	2.3; 0	0.8
