= Candidates of the 2026 Slovenian parliamentary election by constituency =

The 2026 parliamentary election will take place on 22 March 2026. Counting will begin immediately after conclusion of voting at 19:00 the same day and the results for almost all constituencies declared in the later hours of the evening.

== Kranj ==
=== Jesenice ===
Parliamentary election 2026: Jesenice
Party	Candidate	Votes	%	±%
Freedom Movement	Alenka Bratušek	5,863	36.57	▲1.68 %
Slovenian Democratic Party	Zdravko Počivalšek	3,446	21.50	▲2.71 %
Resni.ca	Ana Pavlovski	1,492	9.31	▲3.60 %
NSi, SLS, FOKUS	Martina Žagar	926	5.78	▲1.13 %
Social Democrats	Franci Koražija	891	5.56	▼0.75 %
Levica and Vesna	Fahir Gutić	833	5.20	▲1.06 %
Democrats of Anže Logar	Alja Perhoč	751	4.68	N/A
Prerod - Party of Vladimir Prebilič	Janez Poklukar	743	4.63	N/A
Pirate Party of Slovenia	Haris Hatić	404	2.52	▲0.53 %
Slovenian National Party	Marica Jurkovšek	287	1.79	▲0.63 %
We, Socialists!	Dejan Justin	110	0.69	N/A
Pavel Rupar's Voice of Pensioners	Viktorija Vodnik	100	0.62	N/A
Alternative for Slovenia	Gaber Piber	74	0.46	N/A
Greens of Slovenia + Party of Generations	Maruša Ferjan	57	0.36	N/A
Karl Erjavec - Trust Party	Borut Stražišar	54	0.34	N/A
Turnout		16.235	62.45 %	▼2.34 %

=== Radovljica I ===
Parliamentary election 2026: Radovljica I
Party	Candidate	Votes	%	±%
Freedom Movement	Katarina Štravs			
Slovenian Democratic Party	Blaž Ažman			
NSi, SLS, FOKUS	Maja Fajdiga Komar			
Social Democrats	Ljuba Tavčar			
Levica and Vesna	Milan Rejc			
Democrats of Anže Logar	Zmago Skobir			
Alternative for Slovenia	Darja Teran			
Resni.ca	Tamara Krajnc			
Pirate Party of Slovenia	Matej Ahačič			
Slovenian National Party	Katja Čelec			
Greens of Slovenia + Party of Generations	Gorazd Pretnar			
Karl Erjavec - Trust Party	Petra Klavčič			
Pavel Rupar's Voice of Pensioners	Franci Kindlhofer			
Prerod - Party of Vladimir Prebilič	Dušan Vučko			
We, Socialists!	Emil Brence			
Invalid ballots				
Turnout				

=== Radovljica II ===
Parliamentary election 2026: Radovljica II
Party	Candidate	Votes	%	±%
Freedom Movement	Alma Intihar			
Slovenian Democratic Party	Nejc Vobovnik			
NSi, SLS, FOKUS	Simon Resman			
Social Democrats	Darko Ćorković			
Levica and Vesna	Andreja Pogačar			
Resni.ca	Peter Podlesnik			
Alternative for Slovenia	Darja Teran			
Democrats of Anže Logar	Tea Košir			
Pirate Party of Slovenia	Janoš Kastelic			
Greens of Slovenia + Party of Generations	Ivan Veger			
Slovenian National Party	Tomaž Grohar			
Karl Erjavec - Trust Party	Boris Sintič			
Pavel Rupar's Voice of Pensioners	Jožica Svete			
Prerod - Party of Vladimir Prebilič	Vojka Jesenko			
We, Socialists!	Andreja Krč			
Invalid ballots				
Turnout				

=== Kranj I ===
Parliamentary election 2026: Kranj I
Party	Candidate	Votes	%	±%
Freedom Movement	Sandra Gazinkovski			
Slovenian Democratic Party	Monika Gregorčič			
Social Democrats	Manja Zorko			
NSi, SLS, FOKUS	Nejc Jagodic			
Levica and Vesna	Jaka Zevnik			
Resni.ca	Neven Polajnar			
Democrats of Anže Logar	Matic Logar			
Pirate Party of Slovenia	Matej Ahačič			
Alternative for Slovenia	Klemen Piber			
Greens of Slovenia + Party of Generations	Beno Lončarič			
Slovenian National Party	Matjaž Perše			
Karl Erjavec - Trust Party	Domen Hvala			
Pavel Rupar's Voice of Pensioners	Rajko Perčič			
Prerod - Party of Vladimir Prebilič	Iztok Purič			
We, Socialists!	Edi A. Klobučar			
Invalid ballots				
Turnout				

=== Kranj II ===
Parliamentary election 2026: Kranj II
Party	Candidate	Votes	%	±%
Freedom Movement	Alenka Bratušek			
Slovenian Democratic Party	Andreja Trilar			
NSi, SLS, FOKUS	Irena Dolenc			
Resni.ca	Zoran Stevanović			
Social Democrats	Mia Lola Živković			
Levica and Vesna	Jaka Zevnik			
Democrats of Anže Logar	Gašper Krč			
Pirate Party of Slovenia	Haris Hatić			
Alternative for Slovenia	Klemen Piber			
Greens of Slovenia + Party of Generations	Jaka Petrovič			
Slovenian National Party	Tina Jezernik			
Karl Erjavec - Trust Party	Elizabeta Fon			
Pavel Rupar's Voice of Pensioners	Miroslav Senedec			
Prerod - Party of Vladimir Prebilič	Barbara Košenina			
We, Socialists!	Alja Kolenović			
Invalid ballots				
Turnout				

=== Kranj III ===
Parliamentary election 2026: Kranj III
Party	Candidate	Votes	%	±%
Freedom Movement	Nika Podakar			
Slovenian Democratic Party	Andrej Kosec			
NSi, SLS, FOKUS	Ivan Meglič			
Resni.ca	Andrej Perc			
Social Democrats	Ilija Dimitrievski			
Levica and Vesna	Janez Rozman			
Democrats of Anže Logar	Elena Zavadlav Ušaj			
Pirate Party of Slovenia	Janoš Kastelic			
Alternative for Slovenia	Sandra Šarič Nježić			
Greens of Slovenia + Party of Generations	Helena Sitar			
Slovenian National Party	Sara Ristič			
Karl Erjavec - Trust Party	Mojca Groše Lambergher			
Pavel Rupar's Voice of Pensioners	Pavel Rupar			
Prerod - Party of Vladimir Prebilič	Barbara Košenina			
We, Socialists!	Nataša Malnar Žibert			
Invalid ballots				
Turnout				

=== Tržič ===
Parliamentary election 2026: Tržič
Party	Candidate	Votes	%	±%
Freedom Movement	Borut Sajovic			
Slovenian Democratic Party	Lucija Zalokar			
NSi, SLS, FOKUS	Rok Šimenc			
Resni.ca	Špela Strelec			
Social Democrats	Drago Zalar			
Levica and Vesna	Nali Belhar			
Democrats of Anže Logar	Špela Močnik			
Pirate Party of Slovenia	Maša Deželak			
Alternative for Slovenia	Brane Kvasinir			
Greens of Slovenia + Party of Generations	Marija Verlak			
Slovenian National Party	Tina Jezernik			
Karl Erjavec - Trust Party	Silva Pogelšek			
Pavel Rupar's Voice of Pensioners	Manca Snedec			
Prerod - Party of Vladimir Prebilič	Andreja Potočnik			
We, Socialists!	Urša Napokoj			
Invalid ballots				
Turnout				

=== Škofja Loka I ===
Parliamentary election 2026: Škofja Loka I
Party	Candidate	Votes	%	±%
Freedom Movement	Jure Trbič			
Slovenian Democratic Party	Andrej Hoivik			
NSi, SLS, FOKUS	Marjeta Šmid			
Resni.ca	Nina Rus Turuk			
Social Democrats	Mirjam Jan Blažić			
Levica and Vesna	Tina Brecelj			
Democrats of Anže Logar	Janez Demšar			
Pirate Party of Slovenia	Indija Stropnik			
Alternative for Slovenia	Jože Patrik Vertačnik			
Greens of Slovenia + Party of Generations	Neža Zupan			
Slovenian National Party	Rok Demšar			
Karl Erjavec - Trust Party	Mateja Kmet			
Pavel Rupar's Voice of Pensioners	Anton Peršin			
Prerod - Party of Vladimir Prebilič	Miha Persyn			
We, Socialists!	Edi A. Klobučar			
Invalid ballots				
Turnout				

=== Škofja Loka II ===
Parliamentary election 2026: Škofja Loka II
Party	Candidate	Votes	%	±%
Freedom Movement	Boštjan Jugovec			
Slovenian Democratic Party	Žan Mahnič			
NSi, SLS, FOKUS	Janez Žakelj			
Resni.ca	Aljaž Rupnik			
Social Democrats	Vladimir Mišo Čeplak			
Levica and Vesna	Rok Bajželj			
Democrats of Anže Logar	Vesna Aleksić			
Pirate Party of Slovenia	Indija Stropnik			
Alternative for Slovenia	Jože Patrik Vertačnik			
Greens of Slovenia + Party of Generations	Štefan Čebašek			
Slovenian National Party	Rok Demšar			
Karl Erjavec - Trust Party	Mato Tunjić			
Pavel Rupar's Voice of Pensioners	Lidija Eržen			
Prerod - Party of Vladimir Prebilič	Miha Persyn			
We, Socialists!	Andrej Novak			
Invalid ballots				
Turnout				

=== Kamnik ===
Parliamentary election 2026: Kamnik
Party	Candidate	Votes	%	±%
Freedom Movement	Boštjan Poklukar			
Slovenian Democratic Party	Nežka Poljanšek			
NSi, SLS, FOKUS	Andrej Kočar			
Resni.ca	Klemen Preložnik			
Social Democrats	Maja Aleksovska-Lesjak			
Levica and Vesna	Ivan Mitrevski			
Democrats of Anže Logar	Iztok Artič			
Pirate Party of Slovenia	Brina Katarina Šoštarič			
Alternative for Slovenia	Janez Korošec			
Greens of Slovenia + Party of Generations	Blanka Trampuš			
Slovenian National Party	Matjaž Perše			
Karl Erjavec - Trust Party	Blaž Pirnat			
Pavel Rupar's Voice of Pensioners	Romana Bele Cehner			
Prerod - Party of Vladimir Prebilič	Adelisa Rujović Osmanović			
We, Socialists!	Tomislav Zdravković			
Invalid ballots				
Turnout				

=== Idrija ===
Parliamentary election 2026: Idrija
Party	Candidate	Votes	%	±%
Freedom Movement	Stanko Močnik			
Slovenian Democratic Party	Andrej Poglajen			
NSi, SLS, FOKUS	Franc Medic			
Resni.ca	Simon Permozer			
Social Democrats	Natalija Kovač Jereb			
Levica and Vesna	Urška Bogataj			
Democrats of Anže Logar	Urša Kveder			
Pirate Party of Slovenia	Brina Katarina Šoštarič			
Alternative for Slovenia	Franka Žele			
Greens of Slovenia + Party of Generations	Gabrijel Leskovec			
Slovenian National Party	Primož Vengušt			
Karl Erjavec - Trust Party	Katarina Žbogar			
Pavel Rupar's Voice of Pensioners	Jože Rastislav Reven			
Prerod - Party of Vladimir Prebilič	Alenka Bradač			
We, Socialists!	Marjetka Rotar			
Invalid ballots				
Turnout				

== Postojna ==
=== Tolmin ===
Parliamentary election 2026: Tolmin
Party	Candidate	Votes	%	±%
Freedom Movement	Erik Pagon			
Slovenian Democratic Party	Danijel Krivec			
Social Democrats	Darja Kapš			
Resni.ca	Nina Bensa			
NSi, SLS, FOKUS	Matej Hrast			
Levica and Vesna	Jože Šerbec			
Greens of Slovenia + Party of Generations	Peter Jožef Česnik			
Democrats of Anže Logar	Ermin Hvalica			
Alternative for Slovenia	Branko Žele			
Pirate Party of Slovenia	Tija Valušnik			
Slovenian National Party	Mitja Vezovnik			
Karl Erjavec - Trust Party	Ariana Tušar			
Pavel Rupar's Voice of Pensioners	Ivan Ravnič			
Prerod - Party of Vladimir Prebilič	Katja Brataševec			
We, Socialists!	Jani Koren			
Invalid ballots				
Turnout				

=== Piran ===
Parliamentary election 2026: Piran
Party	Candidate	Votes	%	±%
Freedom Movement	Neset Dulai			
Slovenian Democratic Party	Klea Jeretič			
NSi, SLS, FOKUS	Tinkara Starman			
Social Democrats	Meira Hot			
Levica and Vesna	Peter Bastjančič			
Democrats of Anže Logar	Robert Smrekar			
Alternative for Slovenia	Jasmin Bešić			
Resni.ca	Sabrina Simonovich Stambolija			
Pirate Party of Slovenia	Gregor Nemec			
Slovenian National Party	Lijana Perko			
Greens of Slovenia + Party of Generations	Ljiljana Jelačić Kerin			
Karl Erjavec - Trust Party	Slađana Simeunović			
Pavel Rupar's Voice of Pensioners	Nevenka Kavčič			
Prerod - Party of Vladimir Prebilič	Mitja Troha			
We, Socialists!	Barbara Nagode			
Invalid ballots				
Turnout				

=== Izola ===
Parliamentary election 2026: Izola
Party	Candidate	Votes	%	±%
Freedom Movement	Robert Janev			
Slovenian Democratic Party	Gregor Perič			
NSi, SLS, FOKUS	Tomo Drevenšek			
Social Democrats	Leonid Danilović			
Levica and Vesna	Alan Medveš			
Resni.ca	Goran Dubajić			
Alternative for Slovenia	Jasmin Bešić			
Democrats of Anže Logar	Robert Gregorič			
Pirate Party of Slovenia	Urša Filiput			
Greens of Slovenia + Party of Generations	Igor Crnić			
Slovenian National Party	Lijana Perko			
Karl Erjavec - Trust Party	Nedeljko Tegeltija			
Pavel Rupar's Voice of Pensioners	Boris Geček			
Prerod - Party of Vladimir Prebilič	Vasja Medvešček			
We, Socialists!	Marko Dimač			
Invalid ballots				
Turnout				

=== Koper I ===
Parliamentary election 2026: Koper I
Party	Candidate	Votes	%	±%
Freedom Movement	Tamara Kozlovič			
Slovenian Democratic Party	Nataša Korenika			
Social Democrats	Matej Tašner Vatovec			
NSi, SLS, FOKUS	Vili Kopše			
Levica and Vesna	Nataša Sukič			
Resni.ca	Irena Jaklič Valenti			
Democrats of Anže Logar	Slaven Bajić			
Pirate Party of Slovenia	Martin Agostini Pregelj			
Alternative for Slovenia	Andreja Milič			
Greens of Slovenia + Party of Generations	Matjaž Klemenčič			
Slovenian National Party	Timon Jeretič			
Karl Erjavec - Trust Party	Martin Lutman			
Pavel Rupar's Voice of Pensioners	Igor Ovčak			
Prerod - Party of Vladimir Prebilič	Erika Marinko			
We, Socialists!	Andreja Lindič			
Invalid ballots				
Turnout				

=== Koper II ===
Parliamentary election 2026: Koper II
Party	Candidate	Votes	%	±%
Freedom Movement	Mateja Čalušić			
Slovenian Democratic Party	Jure Colja			
NSi, SLS, FOKUS	Jelka Železnik Markežič			
Resni.ca	Valter Krmac			
Social Democrats	Jadranka Šturm Kocjan			
Levica and Vesna	Alan Medveš			
Democrats of Anže Logar	Mojca Hilj Trivić			
Pirate Party of Slovenia	Matej Sukič			
Alternative for Slovenia	Ylenia Mahnič			
Greens of Slovenia + Party of Generations	Maja Poberaj			
Slovenian National Party	Tina Jezernik			
Karl Erjavec - Trust Party	Martin Lutman			
Pavel Rupar's Voice of Pensioners	Mirko Tomšič			
Prerod - Party of Vladimir Prebilič	Barbara Umek			
We, Socialists!	Ylenia Mahnič			
Invalid ballots				
Turnout				

=== Sežana ===
Parliamentary election 2026: Sežana
Party	Candidate	Votes	%	±%
Freedom Movement	Andreja Živic			
Slovenian Democratic Party	Goran Živec			
NSi, SLS, FOKUS	Maja Pantelić			
Resni.ca	Dragan Sadžak			
Social Democrats	Zoran Grubišić			
Levica and Vesna	Meri Hreščak			
Democrats of Anže Logar	Alenka Miklavec			
Pirate Party of Slovenia	Matej Sukič			
Alternative for Slovenia	Iris Pahor			
Greens of Slovenia + Party of Generations	Nives Cek			
Slovenian National Party	Maja Šprohar			
Karl Erjavec - Trust Party	Lana Saksida			
Pavel Rupar's Voice of Pensioners	Giuliana Kuzmić			
Prerod - Party of Vladimir Prebilič	Urban Grmek Masič			
We, Socialists!	Bojan Pahor			
Invalid ballots				
Turnout				

=== Ilirska Bistrica ===
Parliamentary election 2026: Ilirska Bistrica
Party	Candidate	Votes	%	±%
Freedom Movement	Boštjan Kerma			
Slovenian Democratic Party	Adrijana Kocjančič			
NSi, SLS, FOKUS	Andrej Černigoj			
Resni.ca	Bogdan Jenko			
Social Democrats	Zoran Grubišić			
Levica and Vesna	Rok Jenko			
Democrats of Anže Logar	Dušan Grbec			
Pirate Party of Slovenia	Urša Filiput			
Alternative for Slovenia	Peter Lipičar			
Greens of Slovenia + Party of Generations	Stojan Lipolt			
Slovenian National Party	Andraž Čeligoj			
Karl Erjavec - Trust Party	Ariana Tušar			
Pavel Rupar's Voice of Pensioners	Ado Barbiš			
Prerod - Party of Vladimir Prebilič	Klara Cah			
We, Socialists!	Denis Kresevič			
Invalid ballots				
Turnout				

=== Postojna ===
Parliamentary election 2026: Postojna
Party	Candidate	Votes	%	±%
Freedom Movement	Aleksander Prosen Kralj			
Slovenian Democratic Party	Jana Gržinič			
NSi, SLS, FOKUS	Majda Godina			
Resni.ca	Nina Rus Turuk			
Social Democrats	Edvard Oražem			
Levica and Vesna	Michaela Selmani			
Democrats of Anže Logar	Denis Smiljanić			
Pirate Party of Slovenia	Irena Kazazić			
Alternative for Slovenia	Peter Lipičar			
Greens of Slovenia + Party of Generations	Matjaž Klemenčič			
Slovenian National Party	Natalija Veldin			
Karl Erjavec - Trust Party	Kasim Ademi			
Pavel Rupar's Voice of Pensioners	Nadica Žakelj			
Prerod - Party of Vladimir Prebilič	Robert Pavšič			
We, Socialists!	Gojmir Lešnjak - Gojc			
Invalid ballots				
Turnout				

=== Nova Gorica I ===
Parliamentary election 2026: Nova Gorica I
Party	Candidate	Votes	%	±%
Freedom Movement	Vesna Humar			
Slovenian Democratic Party	Teja Jelina			
NSi, SLS, FOKUS	Boris Jakončič			
Resni.ca	Danjel Cotič			
Social Democrats	Matevž Vidmar			
Levica and Vesna	Lucia Pascolat			
Democrats of Anže Logar	Petra Šuligoj			
Pirate Party of Slovenia	Gregor Nemec			
Alternative for Slovenia	Ana Jug			
Greens of Slovenia + Party of Generations	Inga Brezigar			
Slovenian National Party	Natalija Veldin			
Karl Erjavec - Trust Party	Nina Abram			
Pavel Rupar's Voice of Pensioners	Zdenko Sirk			
Prerod - Party of Vladimir Prebilič	Borut Jermol			
We, Socialists!	Boris Nemec			
Invalid ballots				
Turnout				

=== Nova Gorica II ===
Parliamentary election 2026: Nova Gorica II
Party	Candidate	Votes	%	±%
Freedom Movement	Matej Arčon			
Slovenian Democratic Party	Marko Černe			
NSi, SLS, FOKUS	Anton Harej			
Resni.ca	Dean Martelanc			
Social Democrats	Majda Stubelj			
Levica and Vesna	Marko Rusjan			
Democrats of Anže Logar	Stojan Cotič			
Pirate Party of Slovenia	Irena Kazazić			
Alternative for Slovenia	Ana Jug			
Greens of Slovenia + Party of Generations	Darinka Kozinc			
Slovenian National Party	Alan Perry			
Karl Erjavec - Trust Party	Nina Abram			
Pavel Rupar's Voice of Pensioners	Giuliana Kuzmić			
Prerod - Party of Vladimir Prebilič	Niki Toroš			
We, Socialists!	Andrej Pelicon			
Invalid ballots				
Turnout				

=== Ajdovščina ===
Parliamentary election 2026: Ajdovščina
Party	Candidate	Votes	%	±%
Freedom Movement	Vesna Humar			
Slovenian Democratic Party	Zvone Černač			
NSi, SLS, FOKUS	Jernej Vrtovec			
Resni.ca	Veronika Rupnik			
Social Democrats	Mitja Tripković			
Levica and Vesna	Veronika Gregorec			
Democrats of Anže Logar	Eva Irgl			
Pirate Party of Slovenia	Tija Valušnik			
Alternative for Slovenia	Majin Maraž			
Greens of Slovenia + Party of Generations	Matjaž Valenčič			
Slovenian National Party	Alan Perry			
Karl Erjavec - Trust Party	Lana Saksida			
Pavel Rupar's Voice of Pensioners	Branka Šijan			
Prerod - Party of Vladimir Prebilič	Tanja Cink			
We, Socialists!	Zlata Vrh			
Invalid ballots				
Turnout				

== Ljubljana Center ==
=== Logatec ===
Parliamentary election 2026: Logatec
Party	Candidate	Votes	%	±%
Freedom Movement	Ana Jaklič			
Slovenian Democratic Party	Zoran Mojškerc			
Social Democrats	Uroš Cajnko			
Resni.ca	Martel Antoni Santinni			
NSi, SLS, FOKUS	Iva Dimic			
Levica and Vesna	Miroslav Ribič			
Greens of Slovenia + Party of Generations	Danilo Tkalec			
Democrats of Anže Logar	Anže Logar			
Alternative for Slovenia	Katerina Vidner Ferkov			
Pirate Party of Slovenia	Ira Mešiček			
Slovenian National Party	Janja Mišič			
Karl Erjavec - Trust Party	Robert Reljić			
Pavel Rupar's Voice of Pensioners	Peter Zidar			
Prerod - Party of Vladimir Prebilič	Benjamin Leskovec			
We, Socialists!	Čedomir Vučič			
Invalid ballots				
Turnout				

=== Vrhnika ===
Parliamentary election 2026: Vrhnika
Party	Candidate	Votes	%	±%
Freedom Movement	Gregor Danev			
Slovenian Democratic Party	Domen Cukjati			
NSi, SLS, FOKUS	Matej Tušak			
Social Democrats	Gorazd Prah			
Levica and Vesna	Barbara Strajnar			
Democrats of Anže Logar	Jaka Južnič			
Alternative for Slovenia	Katerina Vidner Ferkov			
Resni.ca	Alen Đekić			
Pirate Party of Slovenia	Ira Mešiček			
Slovenian National Party	Franc Mišič			
Greens of Slovenia + Party of Generations	Nejc Škof			
Karl Erjavec - Trust Party	Mario Šarlija			
Pavel Rupar's Voice of Pensioners	Peter Zidar			
Prerod - Party of Vladimir Prebilič	Janez Smolej			
We, Socialists!	Tamara Mihalič			
Invalid ballots				
Turnout				

=== Ljubljana Vič-Rudnik I ===
Parliamentary election 2026: Ljubljana Vič-Rudnik I
Party	Candidate	Votes	%	±%
Freedom Movement	Jure Leben			
Slovenian Democratic Party	Alenka Jeraj			
NSi, SLS, FOKUS	Marko Gruden			
Social Democrats	Janez Kastelic			
Levica and Vesna	Mitja Svete			
Resni.ca	Tatjana Popović			
Alternative for Slovenia	Boris Žulj			
Democrats of Anže Logar	Dejan Zakrajšek			
Pirate Party of Slovenia	Igor Brlek			
Greens of Slovenia + Party of Generations	Blaž Grm			
Slovenian National Party	Matjaž Sepin			
Karl Erjavec - Trust Party	Lucija Höferle			
Pavel Rupar's Voice of Pensioners	Klemen Zbačnik			
Prerod - Party of Vladimir Prebilič	Mitja Bervar			
We, Socialists!	Tamara Mihalič			
Invalid ballots				
Turnout				

=== Ljubljana Vič-Rudnik II ===
Parliamentary election 2026: Ljubljana Vič-Rudnik II
Party	Candidate	Votes	%	±%
Freedom Movement	Darko Nikolovski			
Slovenian Democratic Party	Andrej Muren			
Social Democrats	Jonas Žnidaršič			
NSi, SLS, FOKUS	David Tomažin			
Levica and Vesna	Alja Miklavčič			
Resni.ca	Dejana Cigulajkić			
Democrats of Anže Logar	Marko Kušar			
Pirate Party of Slovenia	Igor Brlek			
Alternative for Slovenia	Boris Žulj			
Greens of Slovenia + Party of Generations	Neža Hlebanja			
Slovenian National Party	Tatjana Grbić Garvanović			
Karl Erjavec - Trust Party	Nina Pranjić			
Pavel Rupar's Voice of Pensioners	Tanja Cesar Romanov			
Prerod - Party of Vladimir Prebilič	Barbara Gašperlin			
We, Socialists!	Martin Krauser			
Invalid ballots				
Turnout				

=== Ljubljana Vič-Rudnik III ===
Parliamentary election 2026: Ljubljana Vič-Rudnik III
Party	Candidate	Votes	%	±%
Freedom Movement	Tamara Vonta			
Slovenian Democratic Party	Zvone Čadež			
NSi, SLS, FOKUS	Uroš Korošec			
Resni.ca	Alenka Viceljo			
Social Democrats	Mojca Šetinc Pašek			
Levica and Vesna	Petra Blajhribar Kubo			
Democrats of Anže Logar	Alenka Megušar			
Pirate Party of Slovenia	Urška Orehek			
Alternative for Slovenia	Biserka Javoršek			
Greens of Slovenia + Party of Generations	Jaka Vadnjal			
Slovenian National Party	Matjaž Sepin			
Karl Erjavec - Trust Party	Danilo Šarić			
Pavel Rupar's Voice of Pensioners	Tanja Cesar Romanov			
Prerod - Party of Vladimir Prebilič	Petra Mrhar Slak			
We, Socialists!	Klemen Pregl			
Invalid ballots				
Turnout				

=== Ljubljana Vič-Rudnik IIII ===
Parliamentary election 2026: Ljubljana Vič-Rudnik IIII
Party	Candidate	Votes	%	±%
Freedom Movement	Blaž Juren			
Slovenian Democratic Party	Aleš Hojs			
NSi, SLS, FOKUS	Mojca Sojar			
Resni.ca	Urška Blatnik			
Social Democrats	Petra Culetto			
Levica and Vesna	Miran Šolinc			
Democrats of Anže Logar	Tadej Ostrc			
Pirate Party of Slovenia	Urška Orehek			
Alternative for Slovenia	Biserka Javoršek			
Greens of Slovenia + Party of Generations	Lea Herič			
Slovenian National Party	Simon Gregorn			
Karl Erjavec - Trust Party	Nada Španić			
Pavel Rupar's Voice of Pensioners	Amedeja Rodman			
Prerod - Party of Vladimir Prebilič	Zvonko Zajc			
We, Socialists!	Blaž Debevec			
Invalid ballots				
Turnout				

=== Ljubljana Center ===
Parliamentary election 2026: Ljubljana Center
Party	Candidate	Votes	%	±%
Freedom Movement	Urška Klakočar Zupančič			
Slovenian Democratic Party	Karin Planinšek			
NSi, SLS, FOKUS	Mirko Stopar			
Resni.ca	Tomaž Avsenik			
Social Democrats	Tanja Fajon			
Levica and Vesna	Luka Mesec			
Democrats of Anže Logar	Nastja Brelih			
Pirate Party of Slovenia	Jasmin Feratović			
Alternative for Slovenia	Violeta Tomić			
Greens of Slovenia + Party of Generations	Rajko Kotnik			
Slovenian National Party	Simon Gregorn			
Karl Erjavec - Trust Party	Mojca Cvetko			
Pavel Rupar's Voice of Pensioners	Valentina Višnar Jernej			
Prerod - Party of Vladimir Prebilič	Gregor Novak			
We, Socialists!	Miha Kordiš			
Invalid ballots				
Turnout				

=== Ljubljana Šiška I ===
Parliamentary election 2026: Ljubljana Šiška I
Party	Candidate	Votes	%	±%
Freedom Movement	Andrej Klemenc			
Slovenian Democratic Party	Mojca Škrinjar			
NSi, SLS, FOKUS	Marija Ivanovska Preskar			
Resni.ca	Dejan Stevanić			
Social Democrats	Živa Živković			
Levica and Vesna	Luka Mesec			
Democrats of Anže Logar	Marjetica Primožič			
Pirate Party of Slovenia	Jasmin Feratović			
Alternative for Slovenia	Jure Pogačnik			
Greens of Slovenia + Party of Generations	Vlado Dimovski			
Slovenian National Party	Tomaž Ogrin			
Karl Erjavec - Trust Party	Vanja Cimperšek Škof			
Pavel Rupar's Voice of Pensioners	Jože Tkalčič			
Prerod - Party of Vladimir Prebilič	Zoran Potić			
We, Socialists!	Miha Kordiš			
Invalid ballots				
Turnout				

=== Ljubljana Šiška II ===
Parliamentary election 2026: Ljubljana Šiška II
Party	Candidate	Votes	%	±%
Freedom Movement	Duško Vujanović			
Slovenian Democratic Party	Rihard Gerbec			
NSi, SLS, FOKUS	Marcela Uršič			
Resni.ca	Maria Čekić			
Social Democrats	Luka Goršek			
Levica and Vesna	Dan Juvan			
Democrats of Anže Logar	Ingrid Kovšca Pušenjak			
Pirate Party of Slovenia	Ratko Stojiljković			
Alternative for Slovenia	Jure Pogačnik			
Greens of Slovenia + Party of Generations	Simona Leskovec			
Slovenian National Party	Tomaž Ogrin			
Karl Erjavec - Trust Party	Aleksander Šišakovič			
Pavel Rupar's Voice of Pensioners	Branko Novina			
Prerod - Party of Vladimir Prebilič	Irena Kuntarič Hribar			
We, Socialists!	Zala Mavsar Bandelj			
Invalid ballots				
Turnout				

=== Ljubljana Šiška III ===
Parliamentary election 2026: Ljubljana Šiška III
Party	Candidate	Votes	%	±%
Freedom Movement	Lucija Tacer Perlin			
Slovenian Democratic Party	Ksenija Sever			
NSi, SLS, FOKUS	Igor Beguš			
Resni.ca	Andrej Žerovc			
Social Democrats	Neva Grašič			
Levica and Vesna	Biserka Marolt Meden			
Democrats of Anže Logar	Dragana Savić Kuleto			
Pirate Party of Slovenia	Ratko Stojiljković			
Alternative for Slovenia	Igor Koršič			
Greens of Slovenia + Party of Generations	Tia Paynich			
Slovenian National Party	Mirjam Čelec			
Karl Erjavec - Trust Party	Blaž Pirnat			
Pavel Rupar's Voice of Pensioners	Romana Bele Cehner			
Prerod - Party of Vladimir Prebilič	Adelisa Rujović Osmanović			
We, Socialists!	Tomislav Zdravković			
Invalid ballots				
Turnout				

=== Ljubljana Šiška IV ===
Parliamentary election 2026: Ljubljana Šiška IV
Party	Candidate	Votes	%	±%
Freedom Movement	Miroslav Gregorič			
Slovenian Democratic Party	Leon Merjasec			
NSi, SLS, FOKUS	Marko Kajzer			
Resni.ca	Gordana Grobelnik			
Social Democrats	Luka Rotar			
Levica and Vesna	Biserka Marolt Meden			
Democrats of Anže Logar	Igor Horvat			
Pirate Party of Slovenia	Liza Ana Cukor			
Alternative for Slovenia	Marieta Stoimenova			
Greens of Slovenia + Party of Generations	Dragan Djukić			
Slovenian National Party	Magda Jezernik			
Karl Erjavec - Trust Party	Silva Umek			
Pavel Rupar's Voice of Pensioners	Stanislav Žagar			
Prerod - Party of Vladimir Prebilič	Marike Grubar			
We, Socialists!	Natalija Veselič Martinjak			
Invalid ballots				
Turnout				
