= Asta Vrečko =

Slovenian politician (born 1984)

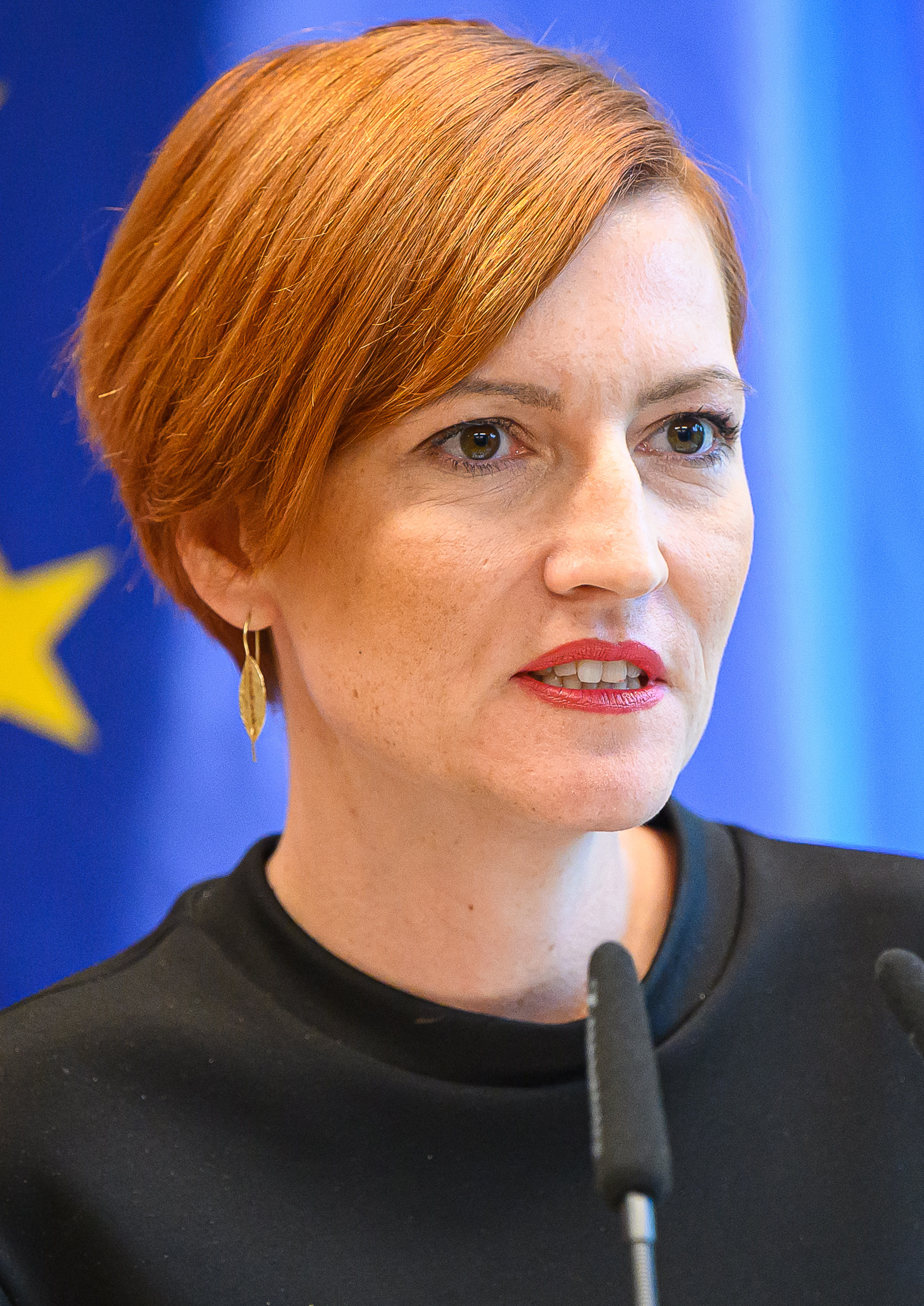
- Vrečko in 2024

Minister of Culture
- In office 1 June 2022 – 4 June 2026
- Preceded by: Vasko Simoniti
- Succeeded by: Ignacija Fridl Jarc

Coordinator of Levica
- Incumbent
- Assumed office 2 September 2023
- Preceded by: Luka Mesec

Personal details
- Born: Asta Vrečko; 13 August 1984 (age 42) Celje, SR Slovenia, SFR Yugoslavia
- Party: Levica (since 2017)
- Other political affiliations: IDS (2014–2017)
- Occupation: politician art historian

Asta Vrečko (born 13 August 1984) is a Slovenian politician. She served as the minister of culture of the Republic of Slovenia between 2022 and 2026. She became the coordinator of Levica in September 2023.

== Youth and education ==
Vrečko was born in Celje and grew up in Šentjur. She graduated in art history and got a job as a young researcher in the department of art pedagogy at the Faculty of Education of the University of Ljubljana. Later, Vrečko was employed as an assistant professor at the Department of Art History of the Faculty of Arts of the University of Ljubljana, where she received her doctorate in 2014. Her areas of research are Slovenian and Yugoslav art in the 20th century, with an emphasis on the study and organization of artists, exhibition history and cultural policy in the period of both Yugoslavias, and camp art.

She also works as an associate at the Božidar Jakac Gallery in Kostanjevica na Krki and also as an external associate at the Academy of Fine Arts and Design in Ljubljana. She is also a curator and co-author of several projects.

== Politics ==
Vrečko has been involved in activism for many years. She was a member of The Workers and Punks University, and in 2014 she co-founded the Initiative for Democratic Socialism, which was then part of the United Left. Today she is a member of the Left party. In the local elections of 2018, she was elected to the post of city councilor in the Municipality of Ljubljana, where she is one of the three councilors of the Left. In 2021, she was chosen as the deputy coordinator of the party. She ran for the party in the National Assembly elections in 2022 and won 1,074 votes in the Ljubljana Šiška 1 district, or 10.49 percent of the vote, but she was not elected as a representative.

=== Minister of Culture ===
When the Left entered coalition negotiations with the Freedom Movement and the Social Democrats, Asta Vrečko was mentioned as the future minister of culture. She was heard before the competent National Assembly committee on 31 May 2022. She began her mandate on 1 June 2022.
