= Initiative for Democratic Socialism =

Initiative for Democratic Socialism Iniciativa za demokratični socializem
- Leader: Collective leadership
- Founded: 8 March 2014
- Dissolved: June 2017
- Merged into: The Left
- Headquarters: Ljubljana
- Ideology: Marxism; Anti-capitalism; Euroscepticism
- Political position: Left-wing to far-left
- National affiliation: United Left
- European affiliation: Party of the European Left
- Colours: red

Website
- http://www.demokraticni-socializem.si/

The Initiative for Democratic Socialism (IDS, Slovene: Iniciativa za demokratični socializem) was a Slovenian Marxist party founded on 8 March 2014, and was part of the United Left electoral alliance. Its collective leadership structure without an individual leader, inspired by Occupy Wall Street, was conceived by members of The Workers and Punks University in November 2013, and only allowed for an elected coordinator of the IDS council. Luka Mesec was the first coordinator to be elected. In 2017 the IDS merged with the Party for Sustainable Development of Slovenia (TRS) to form The Left.

== Program ==
Its program, based on The Workers and Punks University economic analysis, included regulation of neoliberalism in the short term by making tax rates more progressive, directing funds to public works to lower unemployment, and other ideas associated with social democracy. Their long term goal was the replacement of capitalism with democratic socialism, through policies like workplace democracy and nationalization.

== International partners ==
The initiative is linked to the European Left together with other European new anti-capitalist parties, including German Die Linke, French Front de Gauche, and Portuguese Left Bloc.

== 2014 Elections ==
The United Left, which included the IDS, received 5.47 percent of the vote in the 2014 European Parliament election and 6.0 percent of the vote in the 2014 Slovenian parliamentary election.
