= Simon Maljevac =

Slovenian politician (born 1981)

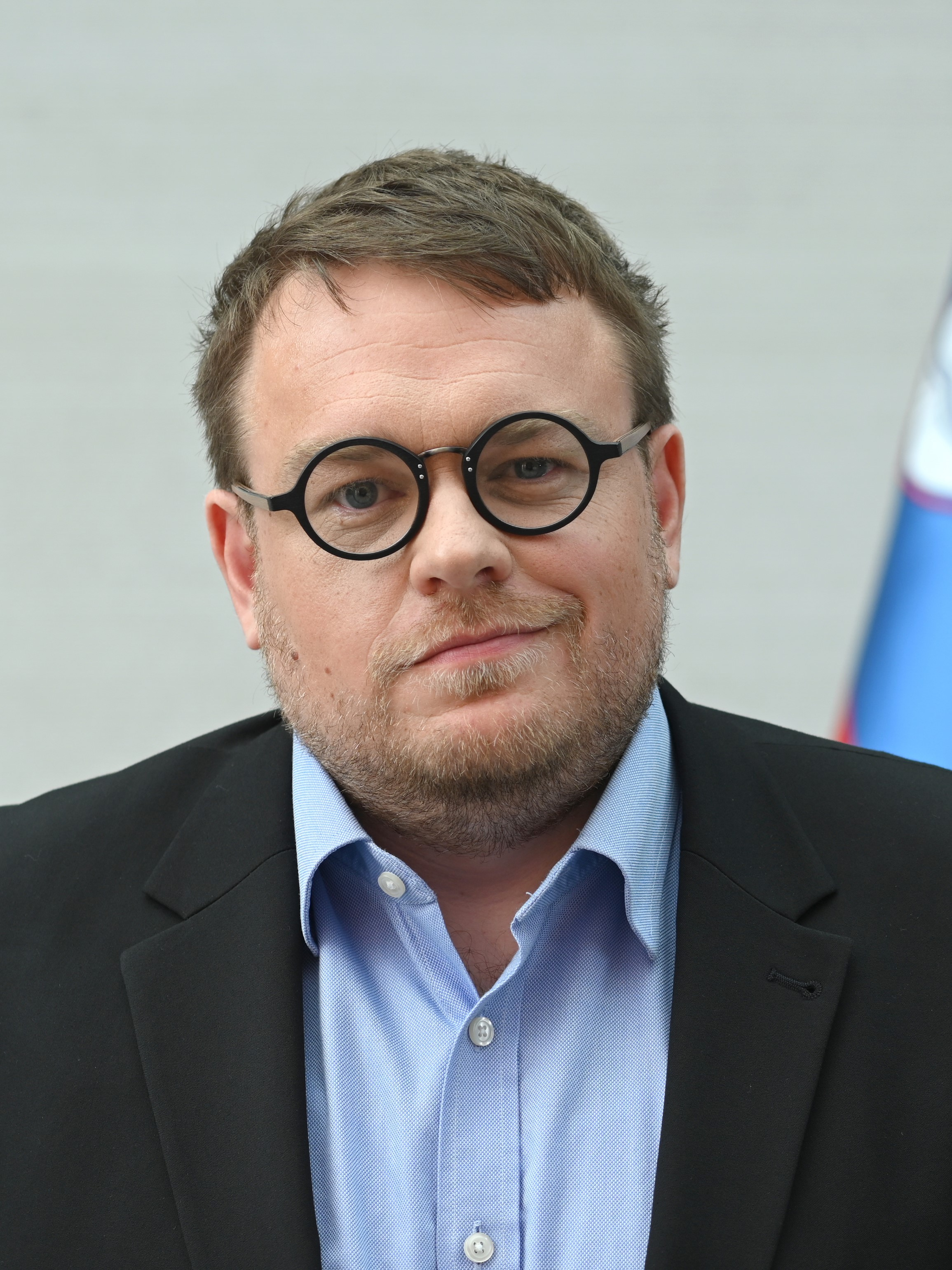
- Maljevac in 2023

Minister of Solidarity-Based Future
- In office 24 January 2023 – 4 June 2026
- Prime Minister: Robert Golob
- Preceded by: Office established
- Succeeded by: Office abolished

Personal details
- Born: 26 February 1981 (age 45) Postojna, Yugoslavia
- Party: The Left
- Education: University of Ljubljana

Simon Maljevac (born 26 February 1981) is a Slovenian LGBT rights activist and politician who served as the Minister of Solidarity-Based Future of Slovenia from 2023 to 2026. He was the general-secretary of The Left from 2018 to 2022.

== Early life ==
Maljevac was born 26 February 1981 in Postojna. He has a degree in sociology from the University of Ljubljana (2012). Maljevac is homosexual.

== Career ==
Maljevac worked for communications engineering agency Directa and Legebitra, a LGBT NGO. During his tenure as head of Legebitra from 2007 to 2017 the organisation became the largest LGBT group in Slovenia. He was the Slovenian representative in the EU Network group of ILGA-Europe in 2006 and president of IGLYO from 2007 to 2009. He and Nika Kovač founded the Inštitut 8. marec in 2016. He was head of the monitoring, awareness-raising and prevention department at the Advocate of the Principle of Equality (Zagovornik načela enakosti) from 2017 to 2018. He has also worked with the Ministry of Health, The Peace Institute, and the Ministry of Labour, Family, Social Affairs and Equal Opportunities on several projects. Maljevac was also editor-in-chief of the Narobe magazine. He has also been an academic and co-authored several scientific papers.

Maljevac was one of the leading members of the "Čas je ZA" group which campaigned for a yes vote during the unsuccessful 2015 Slovenian same-sex marriage referendum. After the referendum he joined The Left as he claimed that it was the only party that fully supported amending the Family Code. He was the general-secretary of The Left from 2018 to 2022. At the 2018 Slovenian parliamentary election Maljevac was a The Left candidate in Kranj but was not elected. At the 2022 Slovenian parliamentary election he was a The Left candidate in Celje but was again not elected.

Following the 2022 Slovenian parliamentary election The Left became a junior partner in the government of Prime Minister Robert Golob. Maljevac was a candidate to be Minister of Labor, Family, Social Affairs and Equal Opportunities but the post was instead given to Luka Mesec. It had been intended that Mesec would head the newly created Ministry for a Solidary Future but this was abandoned after the far-right Slovenian Democratic Party threatened to submit the creation of the new ministry to a national referendum. Maljevac was instead appointed State Secretary with responsibility for equal opportunities, family, disabled persons, older people and deinstitutionalisation at the Ministry of Labour, Family, Social Affairs and Equal Opportunities. In January 2023 he was promoted to Minister of Solidarity-Based Future of Slovenia.

== Personal life ==
Maljevac lives with his partner, academic Roman Kuhar, in Šenčur.

== Electoral history ==
Electoral history of Simon Maljevac
Election	Constituency	Electoral District	Party	Votes	Result
2018 parliamentary	Kranj	Kranj 2	The Left	1,141	Not elected
2022 parliamentary	Celje	Celje 2	The Left	814	Not elected

== Works ==
- ——; Kuhar, Roman; Šalamon, Neža Kogovšek & Humer, Živa (2011). Obrazi homofobije [The Faces of Homophobia] (in Slovenian). Ljubljana, Slovenia: Mirovni inštitut. ISBN 978-961-6455-66-4.
