= United Left (Slovenia) =

United Left Združena levica
- Leader: Collective leadership
- Founded: 1 March 2014
- Dissolved: 24 June 2017
- Succeeded by: The Left; ZL-DSD
- Headquarters: Parmova ulica 41; 1000 Ljubljana
- Ideology: Democratic socialism Eco-socialism; Anti-capitalism; Euroscepticism
- Political position: Left-wing
- European affiliation: Party of the European Left
- Colours: Red

Website
- www.zdruzena-levica.si

The United Left (Slovene: Združena levica, abbreviated ZL) was a left-wing electoral alliance in Slovenia between the Democratic Labour Party (DSD), Party for Sustainable Development of Slovenia (TRS), and Initiative for Democratic Socialism (IDS). The alliance was also founded by a "fourth group" of non-party civic groups and movements, and autonomous individuals.

On 24 June 2017, two of the constituent parties – TRS and IDS – merged into a single party. The alliance is succeeded by The Left (Slovene: Levica, formerly TRS and IDS), and DSD, which has adopted the new title, ZL-DSD.

== History ==
The alliance was formed as a socialist and eurosceptic electoral list with the intention of contesting local, European parliament, and general elections.

ZL made its electoral debut during the 2014 European Parliament election where it did not garner a sufficient vote share to be granted any seats.

Its electoral breakthrough came during the 2014 Slovenian parliamentary election, gaining the 5th most votes and being granted 6 parliamentary seats.

The alliance did not contest the local elections as a single entity, instead, each of the three constituent parties put forward candidates independently. None of the parties were successful in electing any mayors, however, each of them elected multiple representatives in town/municipality councils.

After a lengthy and tumultuous unification process, two of the constituent parties - TRS and IDS - finalized their merger into a single party on 24 June 2017. Luka Mesec was elected party coordinator (he previously held that position in IDS) as the sole candidate. The process was marked by internal disputes. Representatives of DSD and the fourth group, which do not hold any of the 6 parliamentary seats, stated that the other two parties increasingly operated in a non-democratic manner as the reason for remaining independent. The merger was also marked by an exodus of IDS members. IDS was marked by an internal dispute as to whether the parties should unify or continue to operate as an alliance, with dissenting members citing loss of internal democracy and clear political goals as their chief objections.

== Popular support and electoral results ==
=== National Assembly of Slovenia ===
National Assembly
Election year	# of overall votes	% of overall vote	# of overall seats won	±
2014	51,490	6.0	6 / 90	

=== European Parliament ===
European Parliament
Election year	# of overall votes	% of overall vote	# of overall seats won	±
2014	21,985	5.5	0 / 8	
