= We, Socialists! =

We, Socialists! Mi, socialisti!
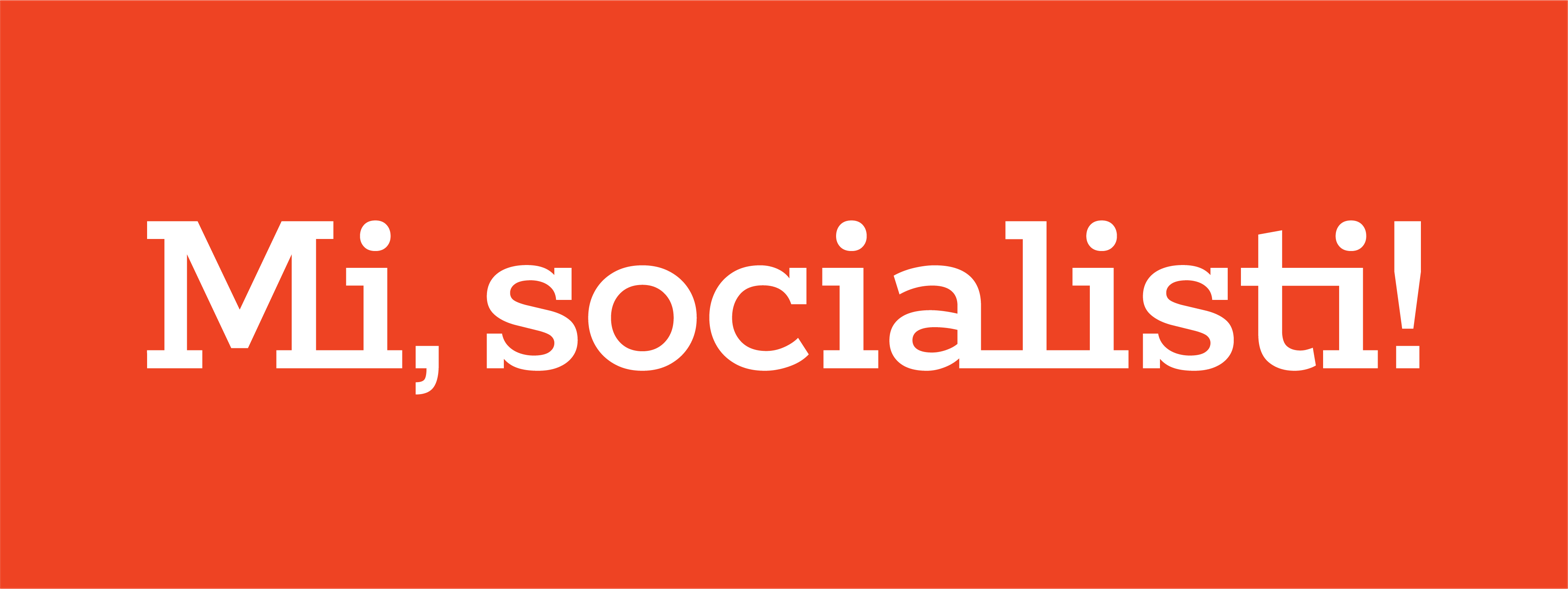
- President: Miha Kordiš
- Founded: 16 November 2025
- Split from: The Left
- Headquarters: Prešernova cesta 3, 1000 Ljubljana
- Membership (2026): 700
- Ideology: Socialism; Social justice Anti-capitalism; Soft Euroscepticism
- Political position: Left-wing to far-left
- Colours: Orange; Purple
- National Assembly: 0 / 90
- European Parliament: 0 / 9
- Mayors: 0 / 212
- Municipal councillors: 0 / 2,750

Website
- misocialisti.si

We, Socialists! (Slovene: Mi, socialisti!) is a Slovenian political party founded by Miha Kordiš, a former MP and activist, together with his supporters. The founding congress was held on 16 November 2025 in Ljubljana, where Kordiš was elected as the party’s first president.

== History ==
=== Background ===
In September 2022, the party The Left selected Kordiš as its presidential candidate in the 2022 Slovenian presidential election. He failed to advance to the second round, receiving 2.8% of the vote (just over 24,500 votes).

In May 2023, a faction within The Left, led by Kordiš, called for a “New Deal,” arguing the party had moved too far to the centre after entering the government coalition. Kordiš unsuccessfully ran for party coordinator in September and said the party must not “forget its roots.”

In February 2024, The Left’s parliamentary group proposed removing him from all parliamentary committees, accusing him of abuse of position and coercion. His membership was suspended in November 2024, which he described as a “purge of the left wing.”

=== Announcement and early activities ===
Kordiš was formally expelled from The Left on 10 March 2025. He announced the creation of an informal socialist initiative that would later become a political party.

The party-in-formation was originally to be named *Left Wing*, but in April 2025 Kordiš announced the final name: *We, Socialists!*.

In May and June 2025, the movement took part in "anti-militarization" protests in Ljubljana and supported an initiative for a referendum on defence spending increases proposed by the government. It also supported efforts to call a referendum on the government’s pension reform, which ultimately failed due to insufficient signatures.

=== Founding ===
The founding congress was held on 16 November 2025 at the Sokolski dom Tabor in Ljubljana. In his address, Kordiš advocated for the abolition of the capitalist system, combatting the climate crisis, and strengthening the working class. The party emphasized withdrawal from NATO, sanctions against Israel, and a 'peace-oriented' foreign policy regarding the war in Ukraine.

Prominent attendees included poet Svetlana Makarovič, activist Jaša Jenull, former health minister Dušan Keber, and former ombudsman Matjaž Hanžek. The congress also elected the party’s presidency and adopted its statute and manifesto.

== Party bodies ==
- Party President: Miha Kordiš
- Presidency: Iza Sladič, Edi Klobučar, Marko Dimač, Blaž Debevec
- President of the Party Council: TBA
- Secretary-General: TBA

== Election results ==
=== National Assembly ===
Election	Leader	Votes	%	Seats	+/–	Government
2026	Miha Kordiš	5,657	0.48 (#11)	0 / 90	New	Extra-parliamentary
