= Member of Parliament (Slovenia) =

Representative in the National Assembly of Slovenia

Member of National Assembly
- Incumbent; Current convocation
- National Assembly of Slovenia
- Style: Member of Parliament (MP); Poslanec / poslanka
- Abbreviation: MP (in English), pos.
- Member of: National Assembly of Slovenia
- Reports to: The electorate of Slovenia
- Seat: Ljubljana, Slovenia
- Appointer: Universal suffrage (elections)
- Term length: 4 years; renewable
- Constituting instrument: Constitution of the Republic of Slovenia
- Formation: 1992
- Salary: Between €3,900 and €5,200 per month (basic gross salary)
- Website: Official website

A member of the Parliament of Slovenia (Slovene: poslanec, poslanka) is an elected representative who serves in the National Assembly of Slovenia, the lower house of the country's bicameral parliament. Members are elected to represent the citizens of the Republic of Slovenia and to legislate on national matters.

== Electoral system ==
The National Assembly consists of 90 members.

- 88 MPs are elected through a proportional representation system with a 4% threshold.
- 2 minority MPs represent the Hungarian and Italian communities and are elected through a preferential voting system.

== Elections ==
Regular elections take place every four years. Early elections may occur if the government collapses or the National Assembly is dissolved according to constitutional provisions.

== Eligibility ==
A candidate must:

- be a citizen of Slovenia
- be at least 18 years old
- be a legal resident of Slovenia

There are few restrictions, MPs cannot hold a position in the government or any mayoral position, the last one was removed in 2011.

== Responsibilities ==
MPs are responsible for:

- passing laws
- approving the budget
- overseeing the government
- adopting national programs
- representing citizens and political parties

== Title ==
Members are commonly referred to as:

- MP (in English),
- poslanec / poslanka (in Slovene).

== See also ==
- National Assembly of Slovenia
- Politics of Slovenia
- Elections in Slovenia
