= Ljubljana smo vsi =

- Co-presidents: Anton Rop; Urška Klakočar Zupančič
- General Secretary: Jani Möderndorfer
- Founded: 23 September 2026
- Headquarters: Gregorčičeva ulica 13a 1000 Ljubljana
- Ideology: Liberalism; Regionalism; Pro-Europeanism
- Political position: Centre to centre-left
- Colours: Orange; Blue
- National Assembly: 0 / 90
- European Parliament: 0 / 9
- Mayors: 0 / 212
- Municipal councillors: 2 / 2,750

Website
- Official website

Ljubljana smo vsi – List of Urška Klakočar Zupančič and Anton Rop (English: We Are All Ljubljana), commonly known as Ljubljana smo vsi (abbreviated LSV), is a Slovenian political party founded by former Prime Minister Anton Rop, former president of the National Assembly Urška Klakočar Zupančič, and their political associates. The party was established in connection with their participation in the 2026 Ljubljana local elections. Its founding congress was held on 23 September 2026, during which Rop and Klakočar Zupančič were elected co-presidents of the party.

== History ==
=== Background ===
Urška Klakočar Zupančič, who served as President of the National Assembly of Slovenia from 2022 to 2026 and was a prominent member of the Freedom Movement, failed to secure re-election to the National Assembly in the 2026 Slovenian parliamentary election, despite receiving slightly more than 4,000 votes, representing approximately 30 percent of the vote in her electoral district. Following the election, she announced her withdrawal from politics the next day. On 24 April, she formally resigned from the Freedom Movement.

After Zoran Janković announced that he would seek another term as mayor in the 2026 Ljubljana local elections, media speculation began regarding potential challengers to his 20-year tenure as mayor of Ljubljana.

In early July, Klakočar Zupančič and former Prime Minister Anton Rop were first mentioned as possible challengers. On 8 July, the two confirmed the speculation and announced that they would form a joint electoral list for the Ljubljana City Council, although they did not reveal their mayoral candidate at the time.

On 2 September, it was officially announced that Rop would run for Mayor of Ljubljana, while Klakočar Zupančič would head the electoral list for the City Council. The formation of a new political party, Ljubljana smo vsi, was also announced for the first time.

=== Establishment ===
The political party, officially named Ljubljana smo vsi – Lista Urške Klakočar Zupančič in Antona Ropa (English: We Are All Ljubljana – List of Urška Klakočar Zupančič and Anton Rop), was founded on 23 September 2026.

Rop and Klakočar Zupančič were elected co-presidents, while Jani Möderndorfer, a former long-serving member of the National Assembly, was appointed secretary-general.

The party held its first policy congress on 3 October. In his speech, Rop advocated for more affordable housing, more reliable public transportation, improved access to healthcare, cleaner air, and what he described as "returning Ljubljana to its people".

The party was also joined by Mojca Šetinc Pašek, a former member of parliament representing the Freedom Movement and later the Social Democrats, and Miha Lobnik, Slovenia's Advocate of the Principle of Equality, whose term in office was due to end on 26 October.

According to Klakočar Zupančič, the party intends to change its name following the 2026 Slovenian local elections, as it also aims to become politically active at the national level.
