= Miha Kordiš =

Slovenian politician (born 1989)

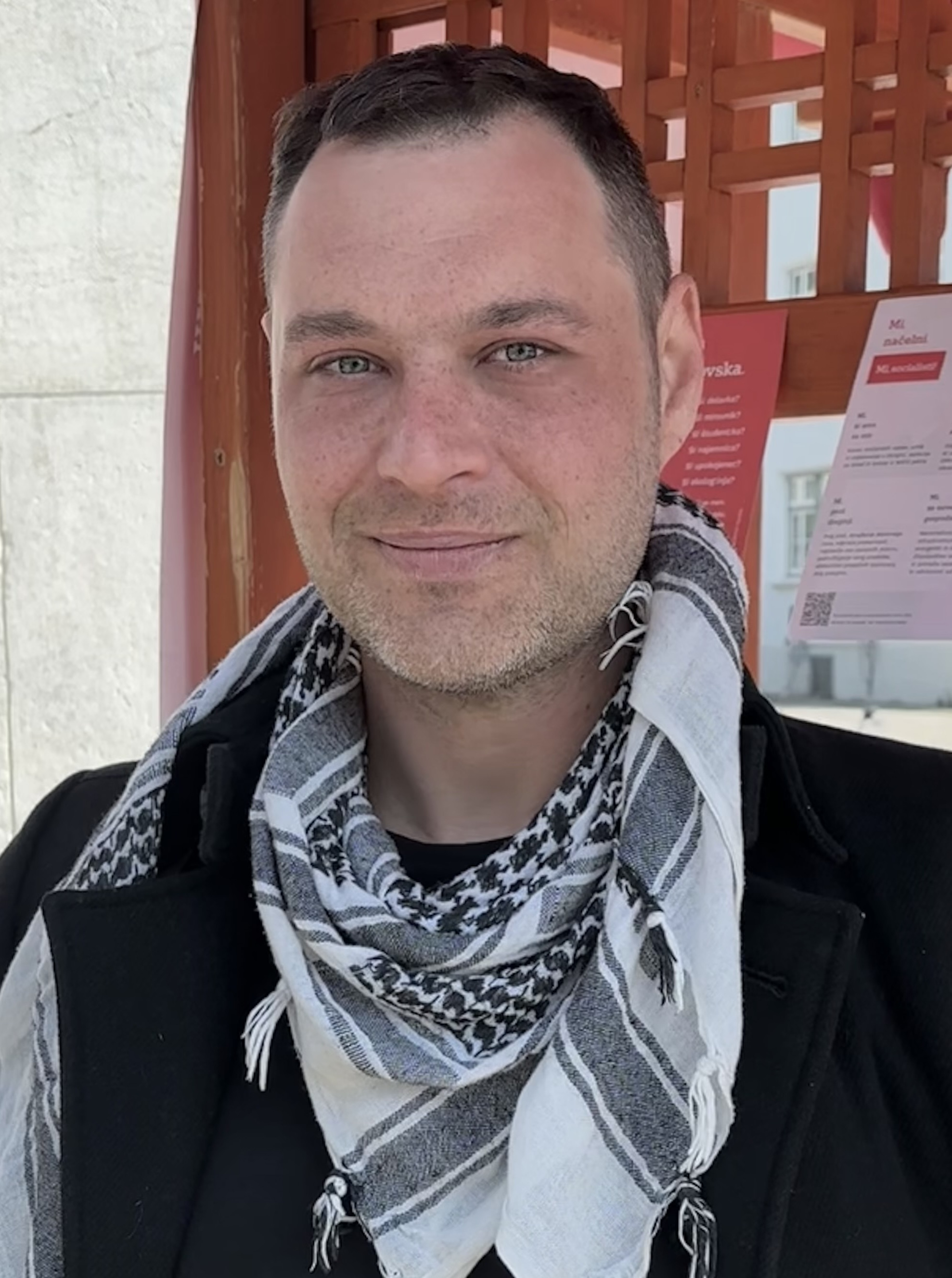
- Kordiš in 2026

Member of the National Assembly
- In office 1 August 2014 – 10 April 2026
- Constituency: Kranj – Škofja Loka 1

Personal details
- Born: 6 March 1989 (age 37)
- Party: We, Socialists! (since 2025)
- Other political affiliations: Levica (until 2024)

Miha Kordiš (born 6 March 1989) is a Slovenian politician who served as a member of the National Assembly from 2014 to 2026. In 2025, he founded We, Socialists!
