= The Workers and Punks University =

The Workers and Punks University in Ljubljana, capital of Slovenia, is an educational project that since 1998 each year from November to May on a topic selected by the WPU board runs a series of lectures based on social theories critical towards neoliberalism, including World-systems theory, applying selected, but not all, Marxian concepts to understand Slovenia as peripheral country, such as the theoretical work of Antonio Negri, Andre Gunder Frank, with participation from notable international academics, including British geographer David Harvey from City University of New York and philosopher Peter Hudis from Oakton Community College, British economist Michael Roberts, economist Joachim Becker from Institute for International Economics and Development Department at the Vienna University of Economics, Dutch economist Angela Wigger from the Radboud University Nijmegen.

== Lecture topics by years ==
The topics by years were:

- 2013/2014 Democratic Socialism (with accompanying round tables with members of German Die Linke, French Front de Gauche, and Greek Syriza)
- 2012/2013 Euro area crisis
- 2011/2012 Financialization,
- 2010/2011 Class Struggle after Class Struggle
- 2009/2010 School as an Ideological Apparatus of Economy,
- 2008/2009 Stupidity,
- 2007/2008 Totalitarianism,
- 2006/2007 On Sin,
- 2005/2006 Political Ecology,
- 2004/2005 Post-Fordism,
- 2003/2004 Love and Politics,
- 2002/2003 May ‘68 – REvision,
- 2001/2002 Utopistics,
- 2000/2001 The Left,
- 1999/2000 The New Right,
- 1998/1999 Neoconservatism.
