= Party of Generations =

Party of Generations Stranka generacij
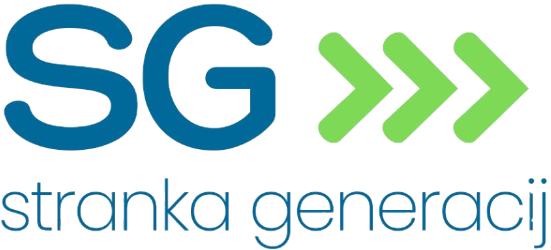
- Abbreviation: SG
- President: Darinka Mravljak (interim)
- Secretary-General: Gregor Petrovski
- Vice Presidents: Smiljan Mekicar; Darinka Mravljak
- Founded: 17 May 2025
- Merger of: DeSUS; Good State
- Headquarters: Tržaška 134; 1000 Ljubljana
- Ideology: Liberalism; Pro-Europeanism
- Political position: Centre to centre-left
- National affiliation: SG–ZS
- European affiliation: European Democratic Party
- Colours: Green, Blue
- Slogan: "A choice for all generations" Izbira za vse generacije
- National Assembly: 0 / 90
- European Parliament: 0 / 9
- Mayors: 0 / 212
- Municipal councillors: 4 / 2,750

Website
- strankageneracij.si

The Party of Generations (Slovene: Stranka generacij, abbreviation: SG) is a Slovenian political party formed by the merger of the Democratic Party of Pensioners of Slovenia (DeSUS) and Good State (Dobra država, DD). The unification congress took place on 17 May 2025 in Radomlje.

== Background ==
The extra-parliamentary parties DeSUS and Good State already joined forces for the 2024 European Parliament elections. Their joint list, headed by veteran journalist Uroš Lipušček, received 14,988 votes or 2.22% of the total.

Shortly after the election, Vlado Dimovski was elected the new president of DeSUS and announced his goal of returning the party to the national parliament. In pursuit of this goal, he began discussions with Good State, officially announcing the merger in April 2025.

At the founding congress of the Party of Generations on 17 May, Dimovski was elected president, while the former leader of Good State, Smiljan Mekicar, became one of the vice presidents. In his address, the newly elected president stated that the merger was motivated by a vision to connect all generations, emphasizing that advocating only for the rights of one generation is not enough. On 3 February 2026, the Party of Generations announced its electoral cooperation with the extra-parliamentary party Greens of Slovenia, led by Andrej Čuš. The party presidents announced their joint candidate list at a press conference on the same day, highlighting the care for all generations, the fight against corruption, a stable and healthy economy, and care for the environment among their related programmatic principles. The alliance's slogan became "Choice for All Generations". In his address, Dimovski said that these were "two traditional parties and strong centrist forces without the background of a deep state," who would deal with "serious issues of the development of Slovenian society."

On 11 June 2026 Vlado Dimovski resigned as party's president and Darinka Mravljak becoming interim leader.

== Party structure ==
- Party President: Vlado Dimovski
- Vice Presidents: Smiljan Mekicar, Darinka Mravljak
- President of the Council: TBA
- Secretary General: Gregor Petrovski

== Election results ==
=== National Assembly ===
Election	Leader	Votes	%	Seats	+/–	Government
2026 (Note: Run in coalition with Greens of Slovenia.)	Vlado Dimovski	5,277	0.45 (#12)	0 / 90	New	Extra-parliamentary
