= The Left (Slovenia) =

Eco-Socialist Political party, Slovenia

The Left Levica
- Coordinators: Asta Vrečko; Luka Mesec
- Founders: Luka Mesec; Violeta Tomič; Asta Vrečko; Simon Maljevac
- Founded: 1 March 2014 (as coalition); 24 June 2017 (as party)
- Merger of: TRS and IDS
- Preceded by: United Left
- Headquarters: Ljubljana
- Ideology: Democratic socialism; Eco-socialism; Antimilitarism
- Political position: Left-wing
- European affiliation: Party of the European Left
- European Parliament group: The Left in the European Parliament
- International affiliation: Progressive International
- Colours: Red Green
- National Assembly: 5 / 90
- European Parliament: 0 / 9
- Mayors: 0 / 212
- Municipal council: 39 / 2,750

Website
- levica.si

The Left (Slovene: Levica) is an eco-socialist and democratic socialist political party in Slovenia. The party was established on 24 June 2017 by the merger of the Party for Sustainable Development of Slovenia (TRS) and Initiative for Democratic Socialism (IDS). The party is a successor of the left-wing electoral alliance, the United Left.

== History ==
=== Foundation ===
First logo of The Left

United Left was an electoral alliance between the Democratic Labour Party (DSD), Party for Sustainable Development of Slovenia (TRS), and Initiative for Democratic Socialism (IDS). The alliance was also founded by a "fourth group" of non-party civic groups and movements, and autonomous individuals. It was intended to provide an alternative to the traditional political establishment which came under intense public scrutiny following the 2011 Slovenian parliamentary elections, and serve as a political outlet for the ideals of the 2012–13 Slovenian protests (termed "Pan-Slovenian uprisings" in Slovene). After a lengthy unification process, two of the allied parties merged into a single entity.

The merger was finalized on 24 June 2017, when the first party congress was held. The merger was accompanied by an exodus of IDS members who hitherto opposed unification. In keeping with IDS custom, the party leader holds the title of "coordinator". During the founding party congress, Luka Mesec was elected as coordinator (a position he previously held in IDS), and Violeta Tomič (previously leader of TRS) was elected deputy coordinator.

=== Since 2017 ===
On 5 July 2017, Matjaž Hanžek left Levica parliamentary group to become an unaffiliated MP, thus leaving the party with only five parliamentary seats. He cited the "incorrect and undemocratic" unification process as the main reason for his departure. He expressed his wish to continue his work as chair of the parliamentary investigative committee looking into the TEŠ six affair (the committee was established as a result of a United Left initiative spearheaded by Hanžek). He was the founder and previously served as leader of TRS, but he stepped down and subsequently also left the party prior to unification.

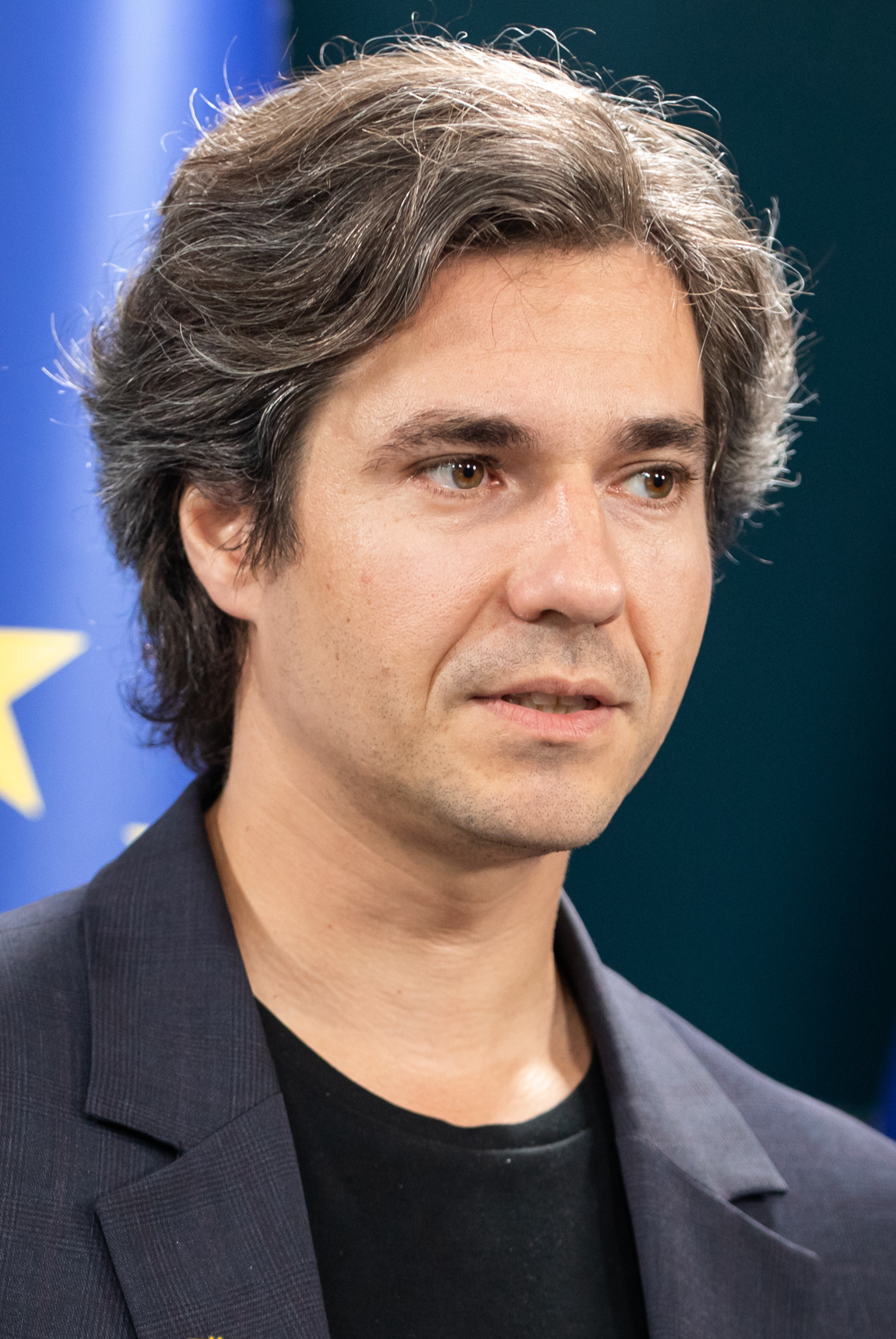
Luka Mesec, coordinator of The Left from 2017 to 2023

Shortly after the 2018 parliamentary election, the party was also subject to criticism due to allegations by party technical staff of relatively low pay, burdensome workload, and poor work relations (particularly with parliamentary group secretary, Matej Kolenc). Three of the party's eight aides announced their resignation and unofficial reports alleged others were also contemplating departure. Mesec, speaking about the affair, promised increased compensation for party staff, and voiced sympathy with the staffers regarding the hefty workload, explaining that due to high productivity of Levica parliamentary group relative to its small size, both MPs and political aides needed to overwork in order to accomplish as many political goals as they did during their first term.

In the 2018 Slovenian parliamentary election, The Left garnered 9.33% of the vote, winning nine parliamentary seats. All five serving MPs were re-elected for second terms. Nataša Sukič (who had hitherto served as the city councilor in Ljubljana) was also elected on the party's ticket, becoming the first openly gay member of parliament in the nation's history.

After the Christian conservative New Slovenia reneged on coalition talks with the five centre-left party core led by PM contender Marjan Šarec (leader of the eponymous election runner-up LMŠ party), The Left became the presumptive coalition partner in Šarec's efforts to attain a parliamentary majority. The Left's insistence on a NATO membership referendum was widely regarded as a deal-breaker for the more Atlanticist coalition core parties. Shortly after NSi's departure from coalition negotiations, however, The Left announced that it will not demand that a commitment to a NATO referendum be included in the coalition agreement. Two days after Šarec was nominated for PM by the five-party group on August 8, The Left vowed support for his candidacy. Šarec was thus confirmed as the ninth PM on August 17, ending the longest political stalemate in the nation's history while also forming the country's first minority government due to The Left's decision not to formally enter the governing coalition.

In March 2020, MP Franc Trček departed the party and parliamentary group due to contentious disagreements with party leadership and internal party culture. Trček subsequently joined the Social Democrats' parliamentary group. In October 2020, The Left joined center-left opposition parties in forming the Constitutional Arch Coalition (Slovene: Koalicija ustavnega loka – KUL), an initiative promoted by the Slovenian economist Jože P. Damijan aimed at forming an alternative government by uniting centre-left opposition parties.

The famous philosopher and Lacanian psychoanalyst Slavoj Žižek has given his support to the party, as of early 2022. In 2022 Slovenian parliamentary election the party lost over a half of support and was one of just five parties that got elected to the parliament. After the election, the Left joined coalition of Freedom Movement and Social Democrats. Luka Mesec, coordinator of the party, became Deputy Prime Minister and Minister of Labor, Family, Social Affairs and Equal Opportunities.

==== New leadership ====
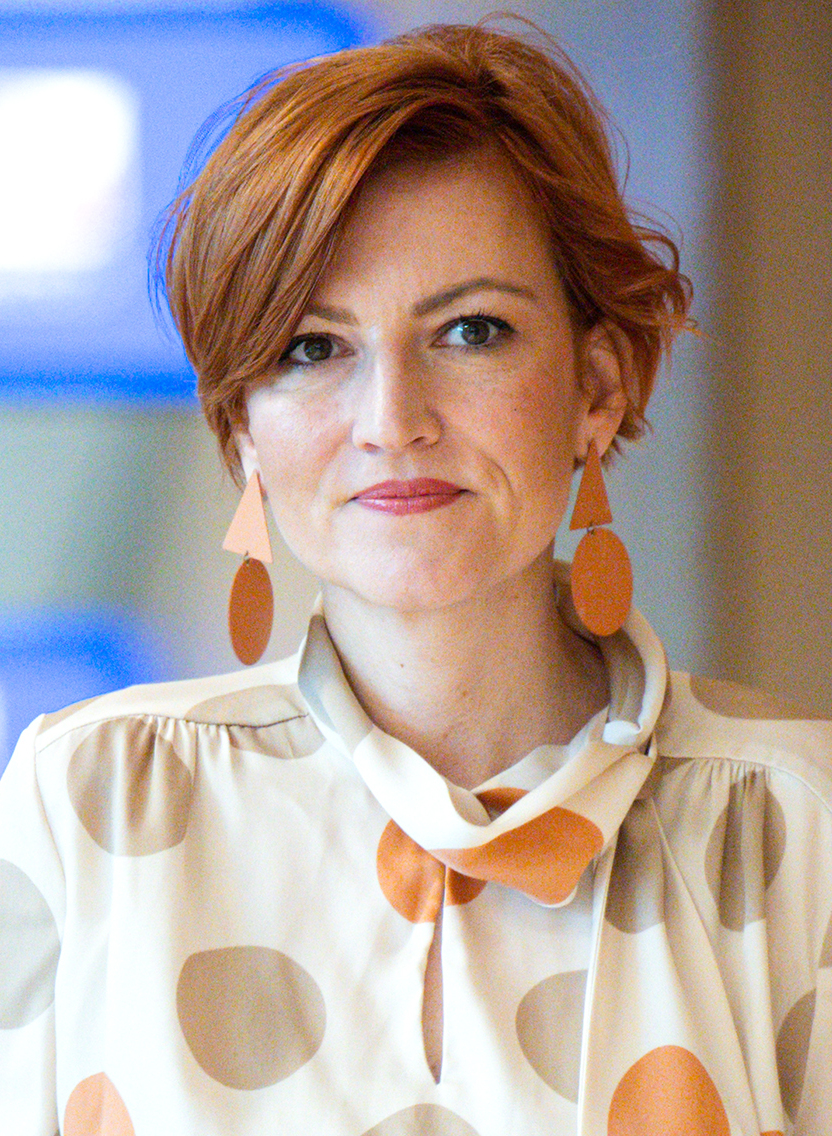
Asta Vrečko, coordinator of The Left since 2023

In June 2023, The Left held its congress and elections for the council and other organs in the party. The morning after the results were announced, Luka Mesec offered to resign his coordinator post after almost ten years at the head of United Left (Slovenia) and later The Left. This happened because the Left wing of the party, headed by The Left MP Miha Kordiš, won 15 out of 25 directly contested seats in the party council. The victorious Left-wing group or "Group of activists" was formed by the members of The Left, who were disillusioned with current leadership and the direction of the party towards the political centre. Mesec told the press "I can detect a clear lack of confidence in me in the results of this congress. It is only correct to ask the party council members, if I should continue as a party coordinator. I will offer my resignation. Before the new council is formed, we will sit down with the Left-wing group and reach a compromise for the party. The basis of the compromise must be an agreement on who should lead the party next".

After the two groups sat down for talks, they didn't reach a compromise on who should be a party leader, therefore both groups fielded their own candidates for the coordinator and other posts in the executive board, which is voted in by the party council. Despite winning the majority of seats in direct council elections, 15 out of 25, the other 24 seats in the council represent the local committees of the party, therefore it was unclear which candidates have the upper hand. After one week of voting, results were officially announced on the morning of 2 September 2023. The new coordinator of The Left became Asta Vrečko, supported by now former coordinator Luka Mesec. She defeated Left-wing group candidate Miha Kordiš. Vrečko said in a press conference "The Left is remaining firm, strong and stable". Kordiš stated "the Left-wing group congratulates Asta Vrečko for a fair victory. It became clear in all this time, that The Left is formed out of a unique spectrum of red, and so it should continue, but the party should never forget its roots".

== Election results ==
=== Presidential ===
| Election | Candidate | 1st round | | | 2nd round | | |
| Election | Candidate | Popular vote | % of vote | # | Popular vote | % of vote | # |
|---|---|---|---|---|---|---|---|
| 2022 | Miha Kordiš | 24,518 | 2.81 | 7th | — | — | n/a |

=== National Assembly ===
| Election | Coordinator | Votes | % of vote | Seats | +/– | Government |
|---|---|---|---|---|---|---|
| 2018 | Luka Mesec | 83,108 | 9.33 (#5) | 9 / 90 | ▲3 | Support (2018–2019) |
| 2018 | Luka Mesec | 83,108 | 9.33 (#5) | 9 / 90 | ▲3 | Opposition (2019–2022) |
| 2022 | Luka Mesec | 53,234 | 4.46 (#5) | 5 / 90 | ▼4 | Coalition |
| 2026 (Note: Run in coalition with Vesna.) | Asta Vrečko; Luka Mesec | 67,183 | 5.69 (#6) | 5 / 90 | 0 | Opposition |

=== European Parliament ===
| Election | List leader | Votes | % | Seats | +/– | EP Group |
|---|---|---|---|---|---|---|
| 2019 | Violeta Tomič | 30,983 | 6.43 (#5) | 0 / 8 | New | GUE/NGL |
| 2024 | Nataša Sukič | 32,436 | 4.81 (#7) | 0 / 9 | 0 | GUE/NGL |
