= Luka Mesec =

Slovenian politician (born 1987)

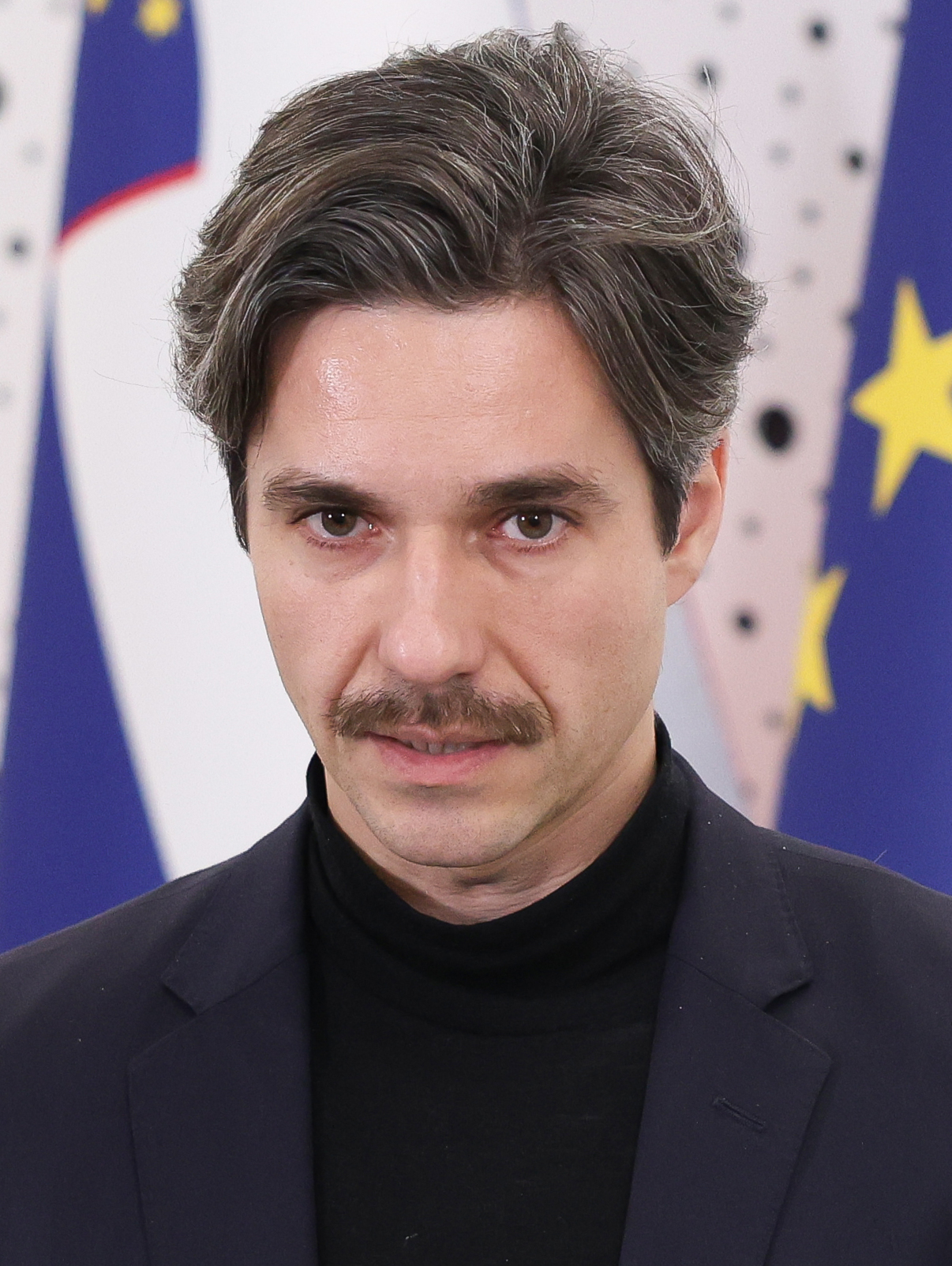
- Mesec in 2026

Deputy Prime Minister of Slovenia
- In office 1 June 2022 – 4 June 2026 Serving with Tanja Fajon; Klemen Boštjančič; Danijel Bešič Loredan (2022–2023); Matej Arčon (2024–2026)
- Prime Minister: Robert Golob
- Preceded by: Zdravko Počivalšek; Matej Tonin
- Succeeded by: Anže Logar; Jernej Vrtovec

Minister of Labour, Family, Social Affairs and Equal Opportunity
- In office 1 June 2022 – 4 June 2026
- Prime Minister: Robert Golob
- Preceded by: Janez Cigler Kralj
- Succeeded by: Office abolished

Member of the National Assembly
- Incumbent
- Assumed office 10 April 2026
- In office 1 August 2014 – 1 June 2022

Co-coordinator of The Left
- Incumbent
- Assumed office 14 November 2025 Serving with Asta Vrečko
- Preceded by: Asta Vrečko

Coordinator of The Left
- In office 24 June 2017 – 2 September 2023
- Succeeded by: Asta Vrečko

Personal details
- Born: 1 July 1987 (age 39) Kranj, SR Slovenia, SFR Yugoslavia
- Party: The Left
- Education: University of Ljubljana

Luka Mesec (born 1 July 1987) is a Slovenian politician who served as deputy prime minister and minister of labour, family, social affairs, and equal opportunities from 2022 to 2026 in the government of Robert Golob. He was coordinator of The Left, a democratic socialist party, from its founding in 2017 to 2023 and has been its co-coordinator, alongside Asta Vrečko, since November 2025.

He entered parliament in 2014 at the age of 27 as the head of the United Left coalition, which became a unified party in 2017. He was re-elected to parliament in 2018, 2022 and 2026. In 2023, Mesec stepped down as coordinator, citing the increasingly polarizing nature of his leadership amid some members' criticism that the party was drifting toward the political center. In November 2025, following changes in the party's by-laws, Mesec was elected as a co-coordinator with Asta Vrečko.

As labour minister, Mesec oversaw successive increases in the minimum wage, the introduction of a mandatory Christmas bonus for employees, as well as a right to disconnect. In September 2025, he steered the adoption of a major pension reform, which was contested by a coalition of trade unions and civil society organizations. The Left contested the 2026 election in an alliance with the green party Vesna, which together won five seats. After Golob was unable to form a government, Janez Janša took office in June 2026 and Mesec returned to parliament. In July 2026, Mesec announced that he would run for the Mayor of Ljubljana in the November 2026 local elections.

== Early life and education ==
Luka Mesec was born on 1 July 1987 in Kranj. He grew up in Železniki, where he finished elementary and high school, after which he enrolled in the political science program at the University of Ljubljana's Faculty of Social Sciences. In 2012, he received a bachelor's degree in European studies. As a student, Mesec was active in the Selca Valley Student Club, the Polituss Student Political Science Club, the Mi smo univerza movement, and the Prekercev front. Since 2010, he has participated in the work of the "Labour-Punk University," an activist organization that introduced democratic socialism to Slovenian politics, and the Institute for Labor Studies.

== Political career ==
Mesec participated in the 2012–13 Slovenian protests. He was elected to the Slovenian National Assembly at the 2014 parliamentary election, and reelected in 2018. Under his leadership, The Left party connected with member parties of the Party of the European Left, including Greek Syriza, French Left Front, German The Left, and Spanish United Left. On June 1, 2022 he was appointed Deputy Prime Minister and Minister for Labor, Family, Social Affairs and Equal Opportunities in the government of Robert Golob.

== Political positions ==
Mesec advocates participatory economics, social corporate governance, tax relief for the poor, labor rights and the abolition of tax havens, and is against neoliberalism, which, in his opinion, is nothing more than a class struggle of capital against organized labor. He also advocates for LGBTQ rights and abortion. He believes that Europe, which once had a strong social democracy and trade unions, is experiencing this class struggle under the guise of European integration, in which countries compete against each other instead of being based on reciprocity.
