= Suhadole =

Suhadole may refer to the following settlements:

- Suhadole, Komenda, municipality of Komenda, Slovenia
- Suhadole, Litija, municipality of Litija, Slovenia

== See also ==
- Suhadol (disambiguation)
