= Paha (disambiguation) =

Paha is a settlement in Novo Mesto, Slovenia.

Paha or PAHA may also refer to:

- PAHA or para-aminohippuric acid
- Paha (landform), a hill or ridge, typically formed of sand and capped with loess
- Paha language, a Kra language spoken in northern Guangnan County, Wenshan Prefecture, Yunnan
- Paha (beetle), a genus of cylindrical bark beetle
- a demon cohort of Lempo, from Finnish mythology
- a minor-planet moon of 47171 Lempo
- Paha, Washington, an unincorporated community

== People with the surname ==
- Isaac Paha, Ghanaian football coach
