= Suhadol =

Suhadol may refer to the following settlements:

- Suhadol, Laško, municipality of Laško, Slovenia
- Suhadol, Slovenske Konjice, municipality of Slovenske Konjice, Slovenia
- Gorenji Suhadol, municipality of Novo Mesto, Slovenia
- Dolenji Suhadol, municipality of Novo Mesto, Slovenia

== See also ==
- Suhadole (disambiguation)
