= Črmošnjice =

Črmošnjice may refer to:

- Črmošnjice pri Stopičah, a settlement in Municipality of Novo Mesto, southeastern Slovenia
- Črmošnjice, Semič, a settlement in Municipality of Semič, southeastern Slovenia
