= Verdun, Novo Mesto =

Verdun
- Location in Slovenia
- Coordinates: 45°46′33.66″N 15°12′45.16″E
- Country: Slovenia
- Traditional region: Lower Carniola
- Statistical region: Southeast Slovenia
- Municipality: Novo Mesto

Area
  - Total: 0.909 km^{2} (0.351 sq mi)
- Elevation: 286.9 m (941 ft)

Population (2026)
  - Total: 110
  - Density: 121/km^{2} (310/sq mi)
- Postal code: 8000

Verdun (pronounced [ʋɛrˈduːn]) is a small settlement in the foothills of the Gorjanci range southeast of Novo Mesto in southeastern Slovenia. The area is part of the traditional region of Lower Carniola and is now included in the Southeast Slovenia Statistical Region. In January 2026, the population was 110.

== Name ==
Verdun was attested in written sources in 1367 as Wardaun (and as Werdin in 1477, Burdin in 1490, and Verdum in 1494). The name Verdun is derived from the Romance word *(g)uardōne(m), based on the Germanic word *wardō 'guard'. Although this place name can be understood in a military sense, it is likely that it referred instead to a place where herdsmen guarded their animals.

== Cultural heritage ==
A burial ground with 254 graves has been excavated near the settlement. It dates to the early Roman period and artefacts show the increased influence of Roman culture on the local population.
