= Jama, Novo Mesto =

Jama
- Location in Slovenia
- Coordinates: 45°45′17″N 15°10′02″E
- Country: Slovenia
- Traditional region: Lower Carniola
- Statistical region: Southeast Slovenia
- Municipality: Novo Mesto

Area
  - Total: 0.604 km^{2} (0.233 sq mi)
- Elevation: 222.3 m (729 ft)

Population (2026)
  - Total: 45
  - Density: 75/km^{2} (190/sq mi)
- Postal code: 8000

Jama (pronounced [ˈjaːma]) is a small settlement south of Stranska Vas in the City Municipality of Novo Mesto in southeastern Slovenia. The area is part of the traditional region of Lower Carniola and is now included in the Southeast Slovenia Statistical Region. In January 2026, the population was 45.
