= Golušnik =

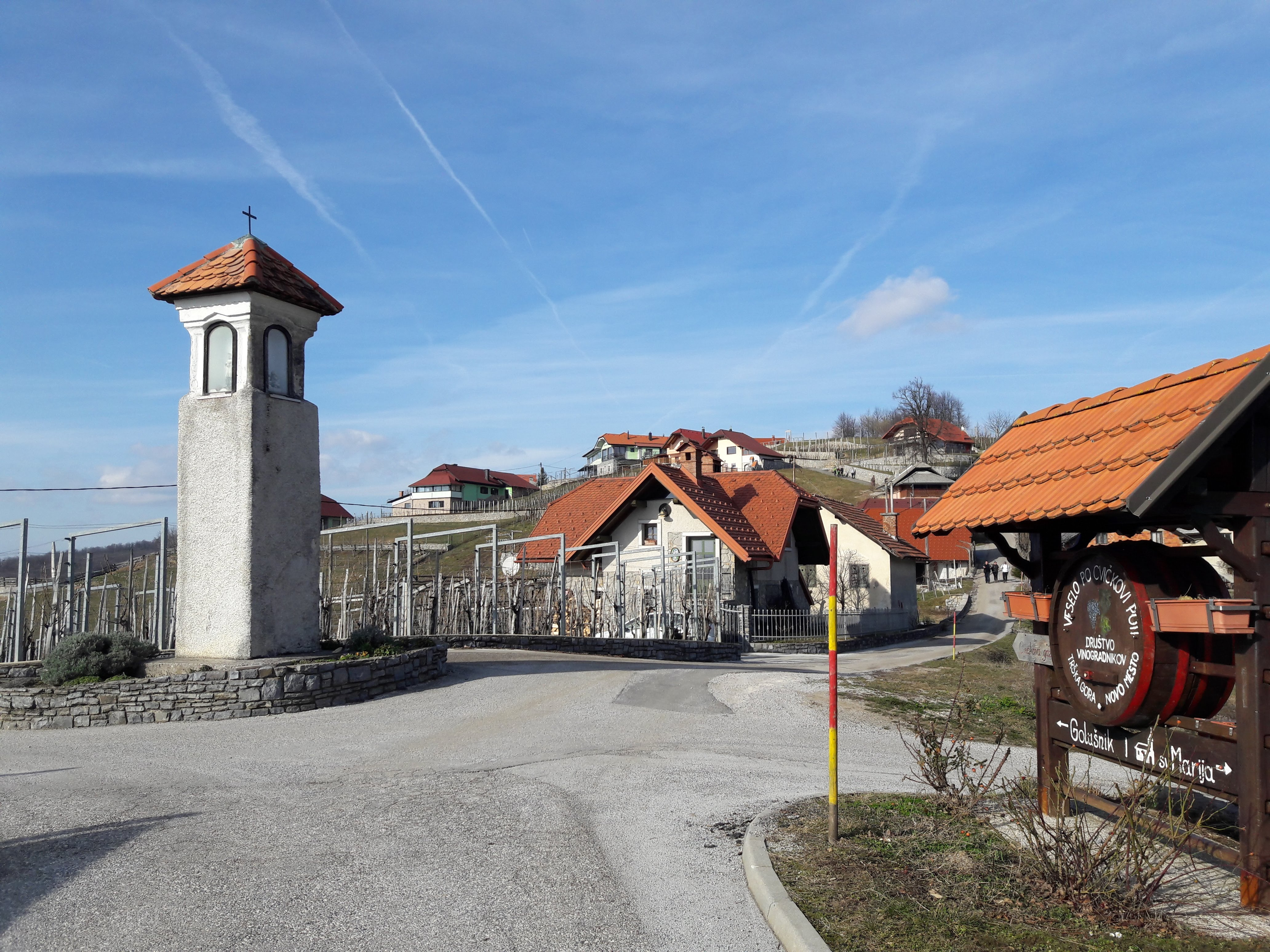

- Location in Slovenia
- Coordinates: 45°51′12.45″N 15°10′47.1″E
- Country: Slovenia
- Traditional region: Lower Carniola
- Statistical region: Southeast Slovenia
- Municipality: Novo Mesto

Area
  - Total: 1.214 km^{2} (0.469 sq mi)
- Elevation: 411.7 m (1,351 ft)

Population (2026)
  - Total: 39
  - Density: 32/km^{2} (83/sq mi)
- Postal code: 8000

Golušnik (pronounced [ɡɔˈluːʃnik]) is a small settlement in the hills north of Novo Mesto in southeastern Slovenia. The entire City Municipality of Novo Mesto is part of the traditional region of Lower Carniola and is now included in the Southeast Slovenia Statistical Region. In January 2026, the population was 39.
