= Gorenje Kronovo =

- Location in Slovenia
- Coordinates: 45°50′54.82″N 15°14′48.54″E
- Country: Slovenia
- Traditional region: Lower Carniola
- Statistical region: Southeast Slovenija
- Municipality: Novo Mesto

Area
  - Total: 0.457 km^{2} (0.176 sq mi)
- Elevation: 173.6 m (570 ft)

Population (2026)
  - Total: 51
  - Density: 112/km^{2} (290/sq mi)
- Postal code: 8000

Gorenje Kronovo (pronounced [ɡɔˈɾeːnjɛ ˈkɾoːnɔʋɔ]) is a small settlement on the left bank of the Krka River in the City Municipality of Novo Mesto in southeastern Slovenia. The area is part of the traditional region of Lower Carniola and is now included in the Southeast Slovenia Statistical Region. In January 2026, the population was 51.
