= Mihovec =

- Location in Slovenia
- Coordinates: 45°47′0.34″N 15°14′28.05″E
- Country: Slovenia
- Traditional region: Lower Carniola
- Statistical region: Southeast Slovenia
- Municipality: Novo Mesto

Area
  - Total: 2.491 km^{2} (0.962 sq mi)
- Elevation: 314 m (1,030 ft)

Population (2026)
  - Total: 29
  - Density: 12/km^{2} (31/sq mi)
- Postal code: 8000

Mihovec (pronounced [miˈxɔːʋəts] or [miˈxoːʋəts]) is a settlement in the hills south of Novo Mesto in southeastern Slovenia. The area is part of the traditional region of Lower Carniola and is now included in the Southeast Slovenia Statistical Region. In January 2026, the population was 29.
