= Mali Orehek =

- Location in Slovenia
- Coordinates: 45°46′32.88″N 15°13′54.6″E
- Country: Slovenia
- Traditional region: Lower Carniola
- Statistical region: Southeast Slovenia
- Municipality: Novo Mesto

Area
  - Total: 0.809 km^{2} (0.312 sq mi)
- Elevation: 328.5 m (1,078 ft)

Population (2026)
  - Total: 44
  - Density: 54/km^{2} (140/sq mi)
- Postal code: 8000

Mali Orehek (pronounced [ˈmaːli ɔˈɾeːxək]) is a settlement in the foothills of the Gorjanci range in the City Municipality of Novo Mesto in southeastern Slovenia. The area is part of the traditional region of Lower Carniola and is now included in the Southeast Slovenia Statistical Region. In January 2026, the population was 44.

The local church is dedicated to Saint Andrew and belongs to the Parish of Stopiče. It was built in the 19th century on the site of an earlier church.
