= Gorenje Grčevje =

- Location in Slovenia
- Coordinates: 45°51′31.27″N 15°10′21.2″E
- Country: Slovenia
- Traditional region: Lower Carniola
- Statistical region: Southeast Slovenia
- Municipality: Novo Mesto

Area
  - Total: 1.239 km^{2} (0.478 sq mi)
- Elevation: 482.2 m (1,582 ft)

Population (2026)
  - Total: 20
  - Density: 16/km^{2} (41/sq mi)
- Postal code: 8000

Gorenje Grčevje (pronounced [ɡɔˈɾeːnjɛ ɡəɾˈtʃeːu̯jɛ]) is a small settlement in the hills north of Novo Mesto in southeastern Slovenia. The entire City Municipality of Novo Mesto is part of the traditional region of Lower Carniola and is now included in the Southeast Slovenia Statistical Region. In January 2026, the population was 20.
