= Herinja Vas =

- Location in Slovenia
- Coordinates: 45°50′58.63″N 15°12′45.72″E
- Country: Slovenia
- Traditional region: Lower Carniola
- Statistical region: Southeast Slovenia
- Municipality: Novo Mesto

Area
  - Total: 1.023 km^{2} (0.395 sq mi)
- Elevation: 312.8 m (1,026 ft)

Population (2026)
  - Total: 132
  - Density: 129/km^{2} (330/sq mi)
- Postal code: 8000

Herinja Vas (pronounced [xɛˈɾiːnja ˈʋaːs]; Slovene: Herinja vas) is a settlement in the hills north of Otočec in the City Municipality of Novo Mesto in southeastern Slovenia. The area is part of the traditional region of Lower Carniola and is now included in the Southeast Slovenia Statistical Region. In January 2026, the population was 132.
