= Jelše pri Otočcu =

- Location in Slovenia
- Coordinates: 45°50′12.68″N 15°12′19.59″E
- Country: Slovenia
- Traditional region: Lower Carniola
- Statistical region: Southeast Slovenia
- Municipality: Novo Mesto

Area
  - Total: 0.768 km^{2} (0.297 sq mi)
- Elevation: 194.3 m (637 ft)

Population (2026)
  - Total: 72
  - Density: 94/km^{2} (240/sq mi)
- Postal code: 8000

Jelše pri Otočcu (pronounced [ˈjeːu̯ʃɛ pɾi ɔˈtotʃtsu]) is a small settlement east of Otočec in the City Municipality of Novo Mesto in southeastern Slovenia. The area is part of the traditional region of Lower Carniola and is now included in the Southeast Slovenia Statistical Region. In January 2026, the population was 72

== Name ==
The name of the settlement was changed from Jelše to Jelše pri Otočcu in 1953.
