= Škrjanče pri Novem Mestu =

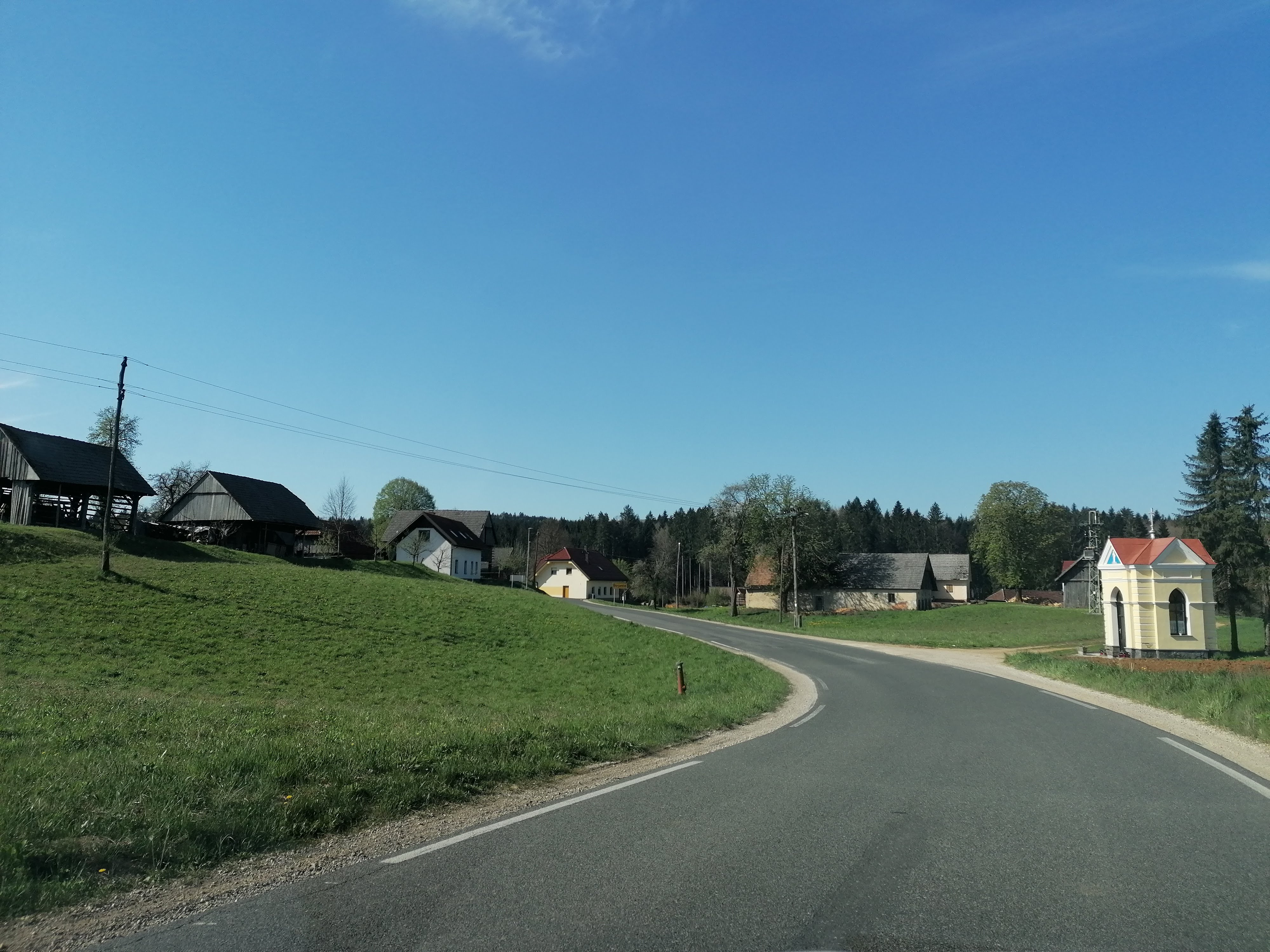

- Location in Slovenia
- Coordinates: 45°46′54.11″N 15°8′55.61″E
- Country: Slovenia
- Traditional region: Lower Carniola
- Statistical region: Southeast Slovenia
- Municipality: Novo Mesto

Area
  - Total: 1.24 km^{2} (0.48 sq mi)
- Elevation: 193 m (633 ft)

Population (2026)
  - Total: 59
  - Density: 48/km^{2} (120/sq mi)
- Postal code: 8000

Škrjanče pri Novem Mestu (pronounced [ʃkəˈɾjaːntʃɛ pɾi ˈnɔːʋɛm ˈmeːstu]; Slovene: Škrjanče pri Novem mestu) is a settlement in the hills southwest of Novo Mesto in southeastern Slovenia. The area is part of the traditional region of Lower Carniola and is now included in the Southeast Slovenia Statistical Region. In January 2026, the population was 59.
