= Lešnica, Novo Mesto =

Lešnica
- Interactive map of Lešnica
- Location in Slovenia
- Coordinates: 45°49′51.29″N 15°12′25.53″E
- Country: Slovenia
- Traditional region: Lower Carniola
- Statistical region: Southeast Slovenia
- Municipality: Novo Mesto

Area
  - Total: 0.403 km^{2} (0.156 sq mi)
- Elevation: 179.4 m (589 ft)

Population (2026)
  - Total: 115
  - Density: 285/km^{2} (740/sq mi)
- Postal code: 8000

Lešnica (pronounced [ˈleːʃnitsa]) is a small village on the left bank of the Krka River in the City Municipality of Novo Mesto in southeastern Slovenia. The area is part of the traditional region of Lower Carniola and is now included in the Southeast Slovenia Statistical Region. In January 2026, the population was 115.

The Lešnica River empties into the Krka in Lešnica.
