= Suhor, Novo Mesto =

Suhor
- Location in Slovenia
- Coordinates: 45°49′11.32″N 15°6′13.37″E
- Country: Slovenia
- Traditional region: Lower Carniola
- Statistical region: Southeast Slovenia
- Municipality: Novo Mesto

Area
  - Total: 0.67 km^{2} (0.26 sq mi)
- Elevation: 271 m (889 ft)

Population (2026)
  - Total: 40
  - Density: 60/km^{2} (160/sq mi)
- Postal code: 8000

Suhor (pronounced [suˈxoːɾ]) is a small settlement west of the town of Novo Mesto in southeastern Slovenia. The entire City Municipality of Novo Mesto is part of the traditional region of Lower Carniola and is now included in the Southeast Slovenia Statistical Region. In January 2026, the population was 40.
