= Male Brusnice =

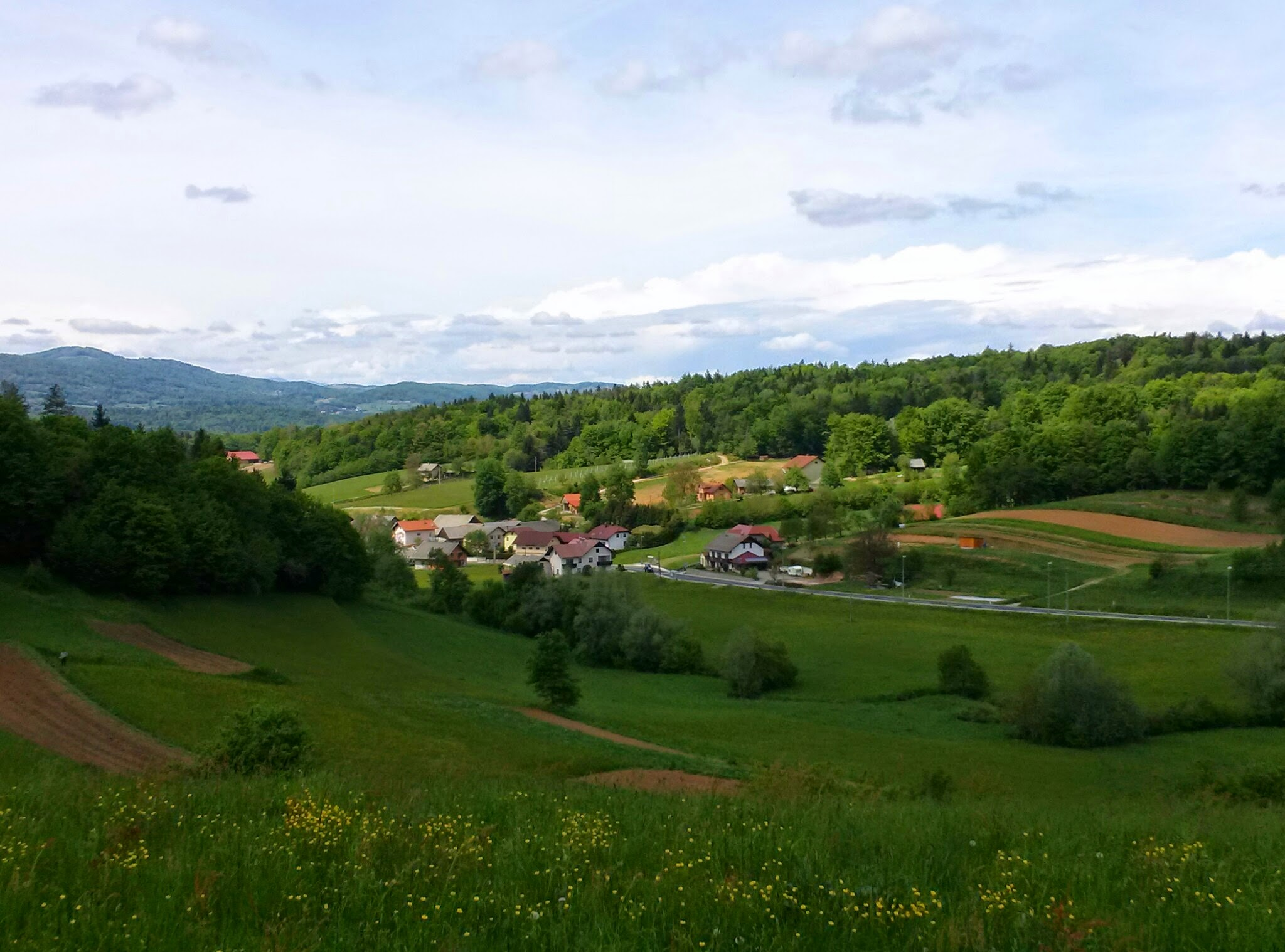

- Location in Slovenia
- Coordinates: 45°49′0.12″N 15°15′1.92″E
- Country: Slovenia
- Traditional region: Lower Carniola
- Statistical region: Southeast Slovenia
- Municipality: Novo Mesto

Area
  - Total: 0.638 km^{2} (0.246 sq mi)
- Elevation: 204.9 m (672 ft)

Population (2026)
  - Total: 49
  - Density: 77/km^{2} (200/sq mi)
- Postal code: 8000

Male Brusnice (pronounced [ˈmaːlɛ bɾuˈsniːtsɛ]) is a settlement in the hills east of Novo Mesto in southeastern Slovenia. The area is part of the traditional region of Lower Carniola and is now included in the Southeast Slovenia Statistical Region. In January 2026, the population was 49

An Early Iron Age burial ground has been discovered in the Krevevški boršt area of the settlement. It comprises 24 graves.
