= Vrh pri Ljubnu =

- Location in Slovenia
- Coordinates: 45°46′33.51″N 15°7′1.68″E
- Country: Slovenia
- Traditional region: Lower Carniola
- Statistical region: Southeast Slovenia
- Municipality: Novo Mesto

Area
  - Total: 2.205 km^{2} (0.851 sq mi)
- Elevation: 211.2 m (693 ft)

Population (2026)
  - Total: 93
  - Density: 42/km^{2} (110/sq mi)
- Postal code: 8000

Vrh pri Ljubnu (pronounced [ˈʋəɾx pɾi ˈljuːbnu]) is a settlement in the hills southwest of Novo Mesto in southeastern Slovenia. The area is part of the traditional region of Lower Carniola and is now included in the Southeast Slovenia Statistical Region. In January 2026, the population was 93.
