= Vrhe, Novo Mesto =

Vrhe Vrhe pri Dolžu (until 1992)
- Location in Slovenia
- Coordinates: 45°45′12.76″N 15°14′47.02″E
- Country: Slovenia
- Traditional region: Lower Carniola
- Statistical region: Southeast Slovenia
- Municipality: Novo Mesto

Area
  - Total: 1.145 km^{2} (0.442 sq mi)
- Elevation: 435.4 m (1,428 ft)

Population (2026)
  - Total: 60
  - Density: 52/km^{2} (130/sq mi)
- Postal code: 8000

Vrhe (pronounced [ʋəɾˈxeː]) is a small settlement in the Gorjanci Mountains in the City Municipality of Novo Mesto in southeastern Slovenia. The area is part of the traditional region of Lower Carniola and is now included in the Southeast Slovenia Statistical Region. In January 2026, the population was 60.

== Name ==
The name of the settlement was changed from Vrhe pri Dolžu to Vrhe in 1992.
