= Štravberk =

- Location in Slovenia
- Coordinates: 45°52′15.52″N 15°11′39.24″E
- Country: Slovenia
- Traditional region: Lower Carniola
- Statistical region: Southeast Slovenia
- Municipality: Novo Mesto

Area
  - Total: 1.419 km^{2} (0.548 sq mi)
- Elevation: 541.8 m (1,778 ft)

Population (2026)
  - Total: 24
  - Density: 17/km^{2} (44/sq mi)
- Postal code: 8000

Štravberk (pronounced [ˈʃtɾaːu̯bɛɾk]) is a small dispersed settlement in the hills north of Novo Mesto in southeastern Slovenia. The area is part of the traditional region of Lower Carniola and is now included in the Southeast Slovenia Statistical Region. In January 2026, the population was 24.
