= Črešnjice, Novo Mesto =

Črešnjice
- Location in Slovenia
- Coordinates: 45°50′36.67″N 15°12′10.87″E
- Country: Slovenia
- Traditional region: Lower Carniola
- Statistical region: Southeast Slovenia
- Municipality: Novo Mesto

Area
  - Total: 1.387 km^{2} (0.536 sq mi)
- Elevation: 264.9 m (869 ft)

Population (2026)
  - Total: 150
  - Density: 108/km^{2} (280/sq mi)
- Postal code: 8222

Črešnjice (pronounced [ˈtʃreːʃnjitsɛ]) is a settlement northwest of Otočec in the City Municipality of Novo Mesto in southeastern Slovenia. The entire municipality lies in the traditional region of Lower Carniola and is now included in the Southeast Slovenia Statistical Region. In January 2026, the population was 150.
