= Dolenje Kamenje, Novo Mesto =

Dolenje Kamenje
- Location in Slovenia
- Coordinates: 45°51′1.9″N 15°9′6.01″E
- Country: Slovenia
- Traditional region: Lower Carniola
- Statistical region: Southeast Slovenia
- Municipality: Novo Mesto

Area
  - Total: 0.759 km^{2} (0.293 sq mi)
- Elevation: 373.7 m (1,226 ft)

Population (2026)
  - Total: 92
  - Density: 121/km^{2} (310/sq mi)
- Postal code: 8000

Dolenje Kamenje (pronounced [dɔˈleːnjɛ ˈkaːmɛnjɛ], in older sources Dolenje Kamnje, German: Untersteinberg) is a small settlement in the hills north of Novo Mesto in southeastern Slovenia. The entire City Municipality of Novo Mesto lies in the traditional region of Lower Carniola and is now included in the Southeast Slovenia Statistical Region. In January 2026, the population was 92.

== Gallery ==
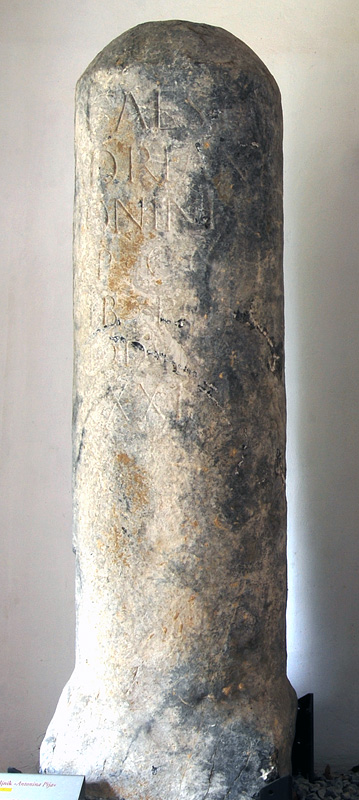
Milestone of Antoninus Pius from AD 139 or 140, discovered near Dolenje Kamenje in September 2005
