= Gorenje Karteljevo =

- Location in Slovenia
- Coordinates: 45°52′6.08″N 15°8′36.05″E
- Country: Slovenia
- Traditional region: Lower Carniola
- Statistical region: Southeast Slovenia
- Municipality: Novo Mesto

Area
  - Total: 2.456 km^{2} (0.948 sq mi)
- Elevation: 332.7 m (1,092 ft)

Population (2026)
  - Total: 184
  - Density: 12/km^{2} (31/sq mi)
- Postal code: 8000

Gorenje Karteljevo (pronounced [ɡɔˈɾeːnjɛ kaɾtɛˈljeːʋɔ]) is a settlement in the hills north of the town of Novo Mesto in southeastern Slovenia. The entire City Municipality of Novo Mesto is part of the traditional region of Lower Carniola and is now included in the Southeast Slovenia Statistical Region. In January 2026, the population was 184.

The local church is dedicated to the Primus and Felician and belongs to the Parish of Mirna Peč. It is a medieval building that was restyled in the Baroque in the 17th century.
