= Gorenje Lakovnice =

- Location in Slovenia
- Coordinates: 45°45′5.17″N 15°10′6.11″E
- Country: Slovenia
- Traditional region: Lower Carniola
- Statistical region: Southeast Slovenia
- Municipality: Novo Mesto

Area
  - Total: 4.172 km^{2} (1.611 sq mi)
- Elevation: 260.2 m (854 ft)

Population (2026)
  - Total: 75
  - Density: 18/km^{2} (47/sq mi)
- Postal code: 8000

Gorenje Lakovnice (pronounced [ɡɔˈɾeːnjɛ ˈlaːkɔu̯nitsɛ]) is a settlement in the hills south of Novo Mesto in southeastern Slovenia. It includes the small hamlet of Cerovec. The area is part of the traditional region of Lower Carniola and is now included in the Southeast Slovenia Statistical Region. In January 2026, the population was 75.

The local church in Cerovec is dedicated to Saint Florian and belongs to the Parish of Novo Mesto–Šmihel. It was built in the late 16th century.
