= Gumberk =

- Location in Slovenia
- Coordinates: 45°49′38.18″N 15°13′47.03″E
- Country: Slovenia
- Traditional region: Lower Carniola
- Statistical region: Southeast Slovenia
- Municipality: Novo Mesto

Area
  - Total: 4.207 km^{2} (1.624 sq mi)
- Elevation: 204.7 m (672 ft)

Population (2026)
  - Total: 81
  - Density: 19/km^{2} (49/sq mi)
- Postal code: 8000

Gumberk (pronounced [ˈɡuːmbɛɾk]) is a settlement in the hills above the right bank of the Krka River in the City Municipality of Novo Mesto in southeastern Slovenia. The area is part of the traditional region of Lower Carniola and is now included in the Southeast Slovenia Statistical Region. In January 2026, the population was 81.
