= Veliki Orehek =

- Location in Slovenia
- Coordinates: 45°46′29.35″N 15°13′34.68″E
- Country: Slovenia
- Traditional region: Lower Carniola
- Statistical region: Southeast Slovenia
- Municipality: Novo Mesto

Area
  - Total: 1.008 km^{2} (0.389 sq mi)
- Elevation: 280.5 m (920 ft)

Population (2026)
  - Total: 111
  - Density: 110/km^{2} (280/sq mi)
- Postal code: 8000

Veliki Orehek (pronounced [ˈʋeːliki ɔˈɾeːxək]) is a settlement in the foothills of the Gorjanci range in the City Municipality of Novo Mesto in southeastern Slovenia. The area is part of the traditional region of Lower Carniola and is now included in the Southeast Slovenia Statistical Region. In January 2026, the population was 111.
