= Birčna Vas =

- Location in Slovenia
- Coordinates: 45°45′10″N 15°8′50″E
- Country: Slovenia
- Traditional region: Lower Carniola
- Statistical region: Southeast Slovenia
- Municipality: Novo Mesto

Area
  - Total: 4.53 km^{2} (1.75 sq mi)
- Elevation: 240.5 m (789 ft)

Population (2026)
  - Total: 346
  - Density: 76/km^{2} (200/sq mi)
- Postal code: 8000

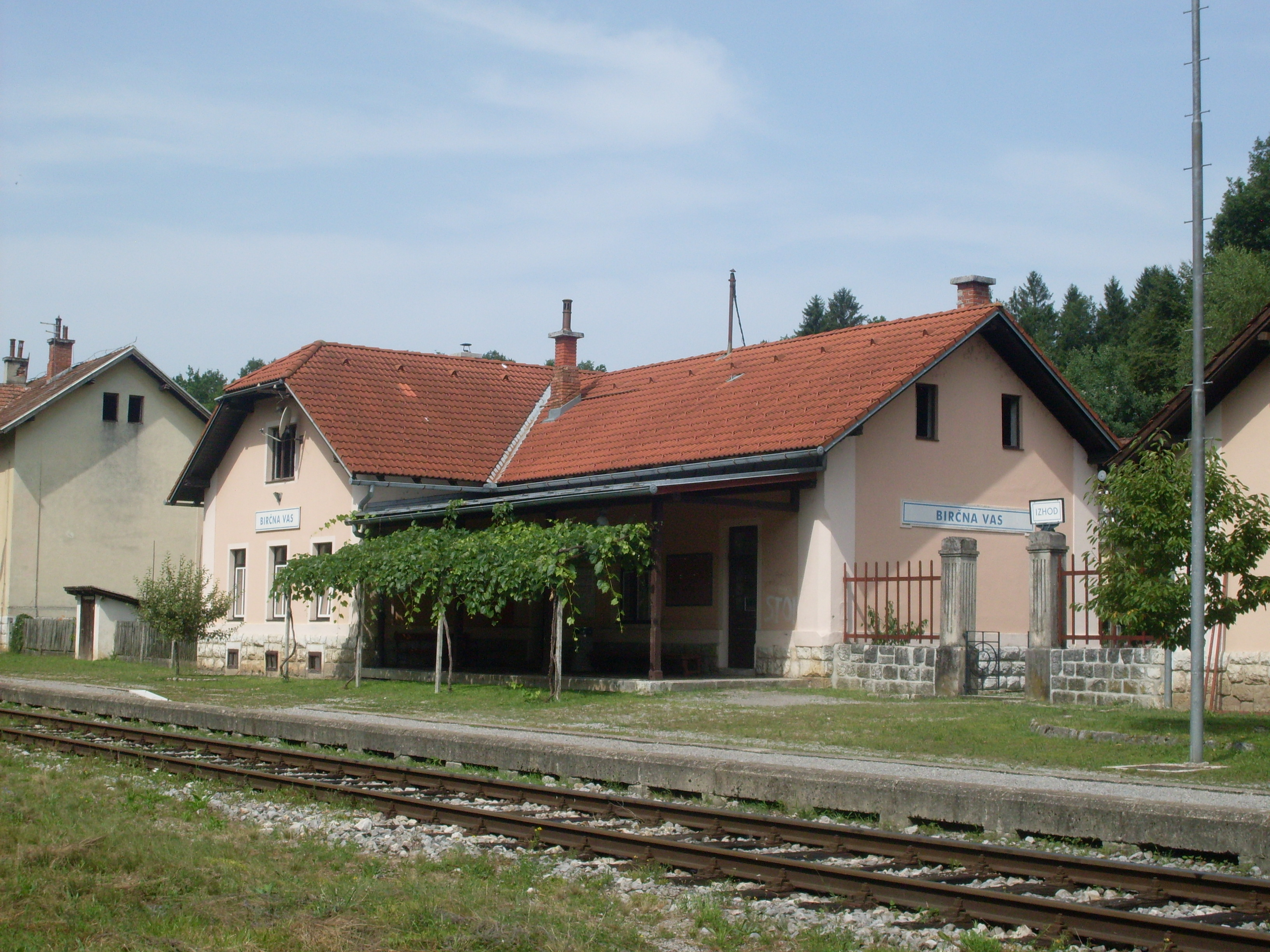
Birčna Vas Train Station

Birčna Vas (pronounced [ˈbiːɾtʃna ˈʋaːs]; Slovene: Birčna vas) is a settlement in the Municipality of Novo Mesto in southeastern Slovenia. It lies on the railway line from Ljubljana to Metlika. It is part of the traditional region of Lower Carniola and is now included in the Southeast Slovenia Statistical Region. In January 2026, the population was 346.

== Name ==
Birčna Vas was attested in written sources as Wericzendorf in 1436.
