= Dolenje Grčevje =

- Location in Slovenia
- Coordinates: 45°51′11.73″N 15°11′30.67″E
- Country: Slovenia
- Traditional region: Lower Carniola
- Statistical region: Southeast Slovenia
- Municipality: Novo Mesto

Area
  - Total: 0.823 km^{2} (0.318 sq mi)
- Elevation: 310.2 m (1,018 ft)

Population (2026)
  - Total: 33
  - Density: 40/km^{2} (100/sq mi)
- Postal code: 8222

Dolenje Grčevje (pronounced [dɔˈleːnjɛ ɡəɾˈtʃeːu̯jɛ]) is a dispersed settlement in the hills northwest of Otočec in the City Municipality of Novo Mesto in southeastern Slovenia. The entire municipality lies in the traditional region of Lower Carniola and is now included in the Southeast Slovenia Statistical Region. In January 2026, the population was 33.
