= Hudo, Novo Mesto =

Hudo
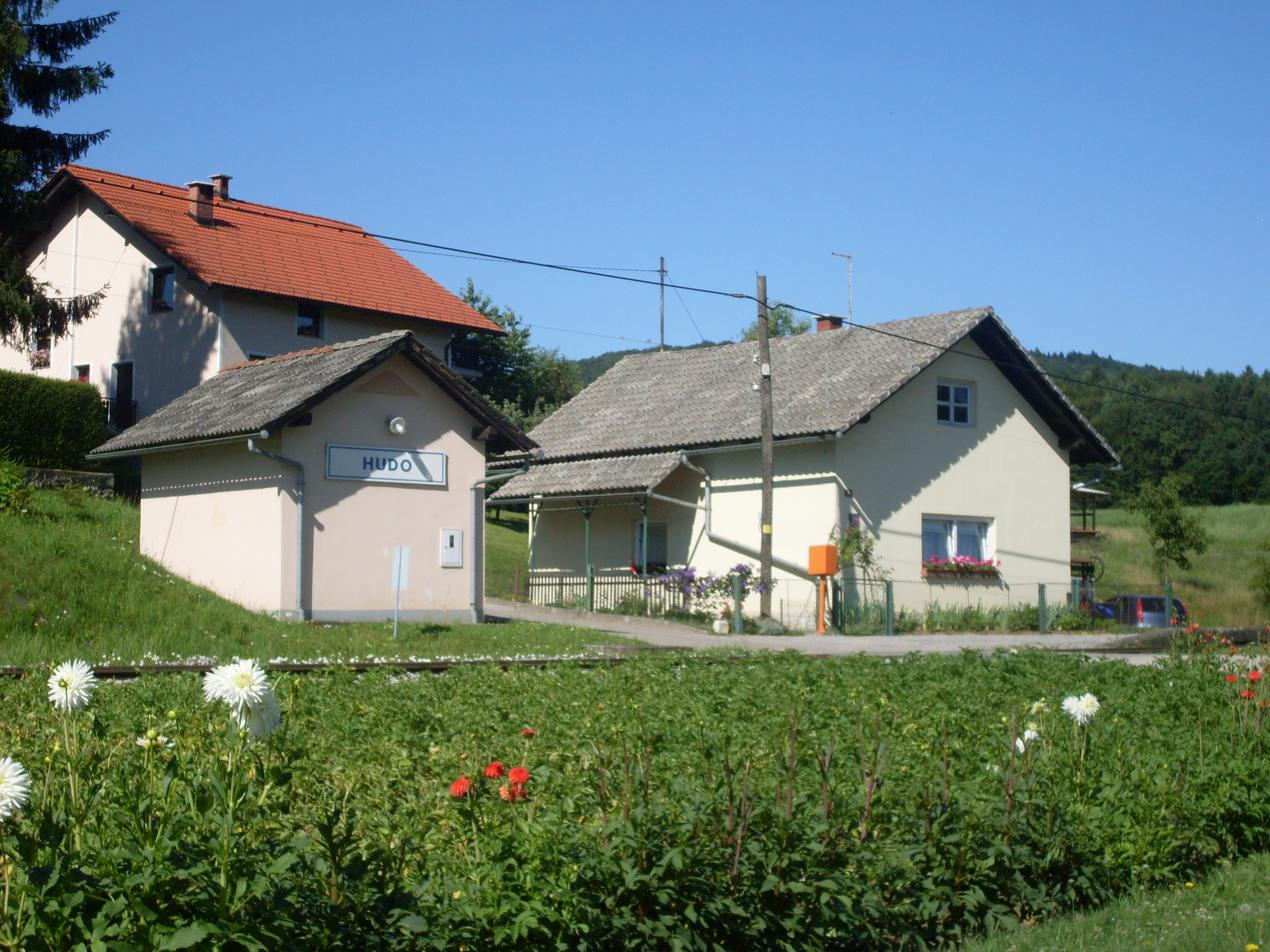
- Hudo railway stop

- Location in Slovenia
- Coordinates: 45°50′3.02″N 15°8′9.78″E
- Country: Slovenia
- Traditional region: Lower Carniola
- Statistical region: Southeast Slovenia
- Municipality: Novo Mesto

Area
  - Total: 0.686 km^{2} (0.265 sq mi)
- Elevation: 203.6 m (668 ft)

Population (2026)
  - Total: 54
  - Density: 79/km^{2} (200/sq mi)
- Postal code: 8000

Hudo (pronounced [ˈxuːdɔ]) is a small settlement north of Novo Mesto in southeastern Slovenia. The area is part of the traditional region of Lower Carniola and is now included in the Southeast Slovenia Statistical Region. In January 2026, the population was 54.
