= Dolenja Vas, Novo Mesto =

Dolenja Vas
- Location in Slovenia
- Coordinates: 45°49′45.05″N 15°13′13.24″E
- Country: Slovenia
- Traditional region: Lower Carniola
- Statistical region: Southeast Slovenia
- Municipality: Novo Mesto

Area
  - Total: 1.03 km^{2} (0.40 sq mi)
- Elevation: 184.1 m (604 ft)

Population (2026)
  - Total: 90
  - Density: 87/km^{2} (230/sq mi)
- Postal code: 8222

Dolenja Vas (pronounced [dɔˈleːnja ˈʋaːs]; Slovene: Dolenja vas) is a settlement on the right bank of the Krka River in the City Municipality of Novo Mesto in southeastern Slovenia. The entire municipality is part of the traditional region of Lower Carniola and is now included in the Southeast Slovenia Statistical Region. In January 2026, the population was 90.
