= Potov Vrh =

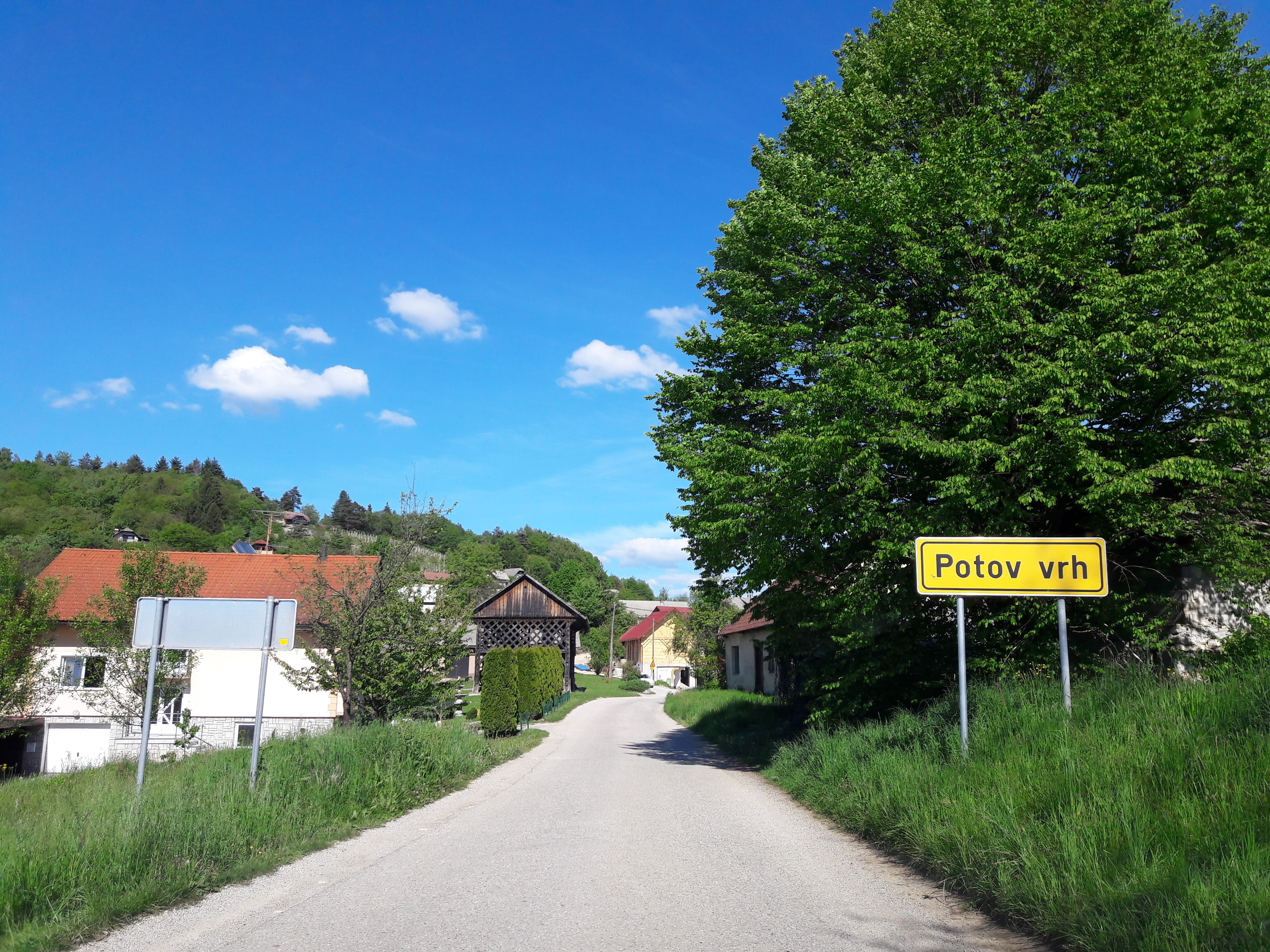

- Location in Slovenia
- Coordinates: 45°48′27.89″N 15°13′45.82″E
- Country: Slovenia
- Traditional region: Lower Carniola
- Statistical region: Southeast Slovenia
- Municipality: Novo Mesto

Area
  - Total: 1.893 km^{2} (0.731 sq mi)
- Elevation: 244.6 m (802 ft)

Population (2026)
  - Total: 180
  - Density: 95/km^{2} (250/sq mi)
- Postal code: 8000

Potov Vrh (pronounced [ˈpɔːtɔu̯ ˈʋəɾx], German: Potendorf) is a settlement in the hills east of Novo Mesto in southeastern Slovenia. The area is part of the traditional region of Lower Carniola and is now included in the Southeast Slovenia Statistical Region. In January 2026, the population was 180.

The local church, built on the eastern outskirts of the village, is dedicated to the Holy Trinity and belongs to the Parish of Novo Mesto–Sveti Lenart. It was built in the late 16th century.
