= Hrib pri Orehku =

- Location in Slovenia
- Coordinates: 45°46′59.51″N 15°13′50.96″E
- Country: Slovenia
- Traditional region: Lower Carniola
- Statistical region: Southeast Slovenia
- Municipality: Novo Mesto

Area
  - Total: 0.937 km^{2} (0.362 sq mi)
- Elevation: 301.9 m (990 ft)

Population (2026)
  - Total: 72
  - Density: 77/km^{2} (200/sq mi)
- Postal code: 8000

Hrib pri Orehku (pronounced [ˈxɾiːp pɾi ɔˈɾeːxku]) is a settlement in the hills southeast of Novo Mesto in southeastern Slovenia. The area is part of the traditional region of Lower Carniola and is now included in the Southeast Slovenia Statistical Region. In January 2026, the population was 72.
