= Mala Cikava =

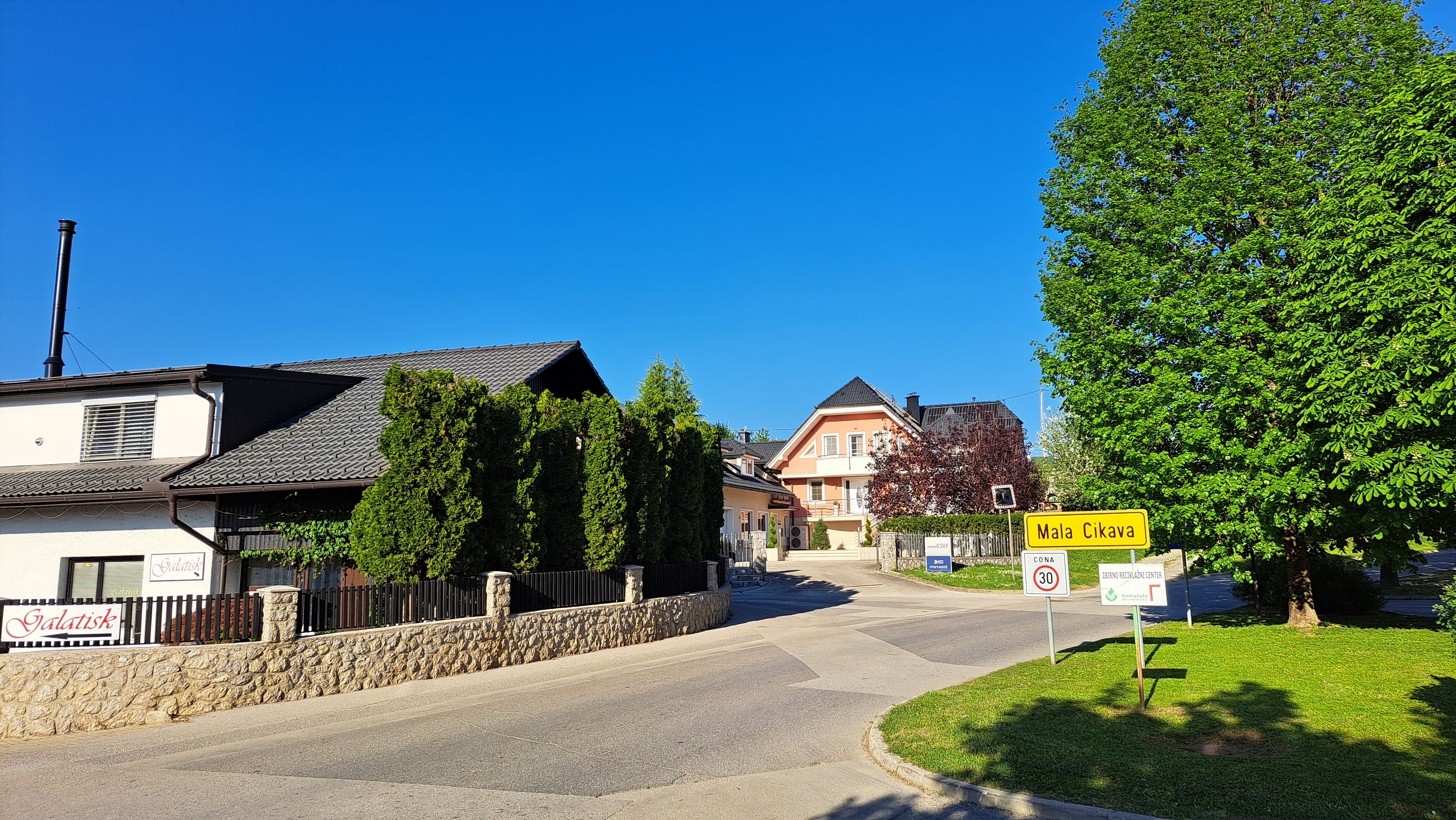

- Location in Slovenia
- Coordinates: 45°48′21.3″N 15°11′54.63″E
- Country: Slovenia
- Traditional region: Lower Carniola
- Statistical region: Southeast Slovenia
- Municipality: Novo Mesto

Area
  - Total: 0.199 km^{2} (0.077 sq mi)
- Elevation: 188 m (617 ft)

Population (2026)
  - Total: 127
  - Density: 638/km^{2} (1,650/sq mi)
- Postal code: 8000

Mala Cikava (pronounced [ˈmaːla tsiˈkaːʋa]) is a settlement east of the town of Novo Mesto in southeastern Slovenia. The area is part of the traditional region of Lower Carniola and is now included in the Southeast Slovenia Statistical Region. In January 2026, the population was 127.
