= Lutrško Selo =

- Location in Slovenia
- Coordinates: 45°50′47.43″N 15°14′21.62″E
- Country: Slovenia
- Traditional region: Lower Carniola
- Statistical region: Southeast Slovenia
- Municipality: Novo Mesto

Area
  - Total: 1.521 km^{2} (0.587 sq mi)
- Elevation: 183.6 m (602 ft)

Population (2026)
  - Total: 203
  - Density: 133/km^{2} (340/sq mi)
- Postal code: 8000

Lutrško Selo (pronounced [ˈluːtəɾskɔ ˈsɛːlɔ]; Slovene: Lutrško selo) is a settlement on the left bank of the Krka River in the City Municipality of Novo Mesto in southeastern Slovenia. The area is part of the traditional region of Lower Carniola and is now included in the Southeast Slovenia Statistical Region. In January 2026, the population was 203.
