= Veliki Podljuben =

- Location in Slovenia
- Coordinates: 45°44′55.02″N 15°7′18.59″E
- Country: Slovenia
- Traditional region: Lower Carniola
- Statistical region: Southeast Slovenia
- Municipality: Novo Mesto

Area
  - Total: 4.453 km^{2} (1.719 sq mi)
- Elevation: 285.2 m (936 ft)

Population (2026)
  - Total: 95
  - Density: 21/km^{2} (54/sq mi)
- Postal code: 8000

Veliki Podljuben (pronounced [ˈʋeːliki pɔˈdluːbən]) is a settlement in the hills south of Novo Mesto in southeastern Slovenia. The area is part of the traditional region of Lower Carniola and is now included in the Southeast Slovenia Statistical Region. In January 2026, the population was 95.
