= Rajnovšče =

- Location in Slovenia
- Coordinates: 45°45′46.26″N 15°10′39.1″E
- Country: Slovenia
- Traditional region: Lower Carniola
- Statistical region: Southeast Slovenia
- Municipality: Novo Mesto

Area
  - Total: 0.906 km^{2} (0.350 sq mi)
- Elevation: 218.4 m (717 ft)

Population (2026)
  - Total: 29
  - Density: 32/km^{2} (83/sq mi)
- Postal code: 8000

Rajnovšče (pronounced [ɾai̯ˈnoːu̯ʃtʃɛ]) is a small settlement in the hills south of Novo Mesto in southeastern Slovenia. The area is part of the traditional region of Lower Carniola and is now included in the Southeast Slovenia Statistical Region. In January 2026, the population was 29.
