= Srednje Grčevje =

- Location in Slovenia
- Coordinates: 45°51′22.08″N 15°11′35.81″E
- Country: Slovenia
- Traditional region: Lower Carniola
- Statistical region: Southeast Slovenia
- Municipality: Novo Mesto

Area
  - Total: 1.252 km^{2} (0.483 sq mi)
- Elevation: 411.7 m (1,351 ft)

Population (2026)
  - Total: 97
  - Density: 78/km^{2} (200/sq mi)
- Postal code: 8000

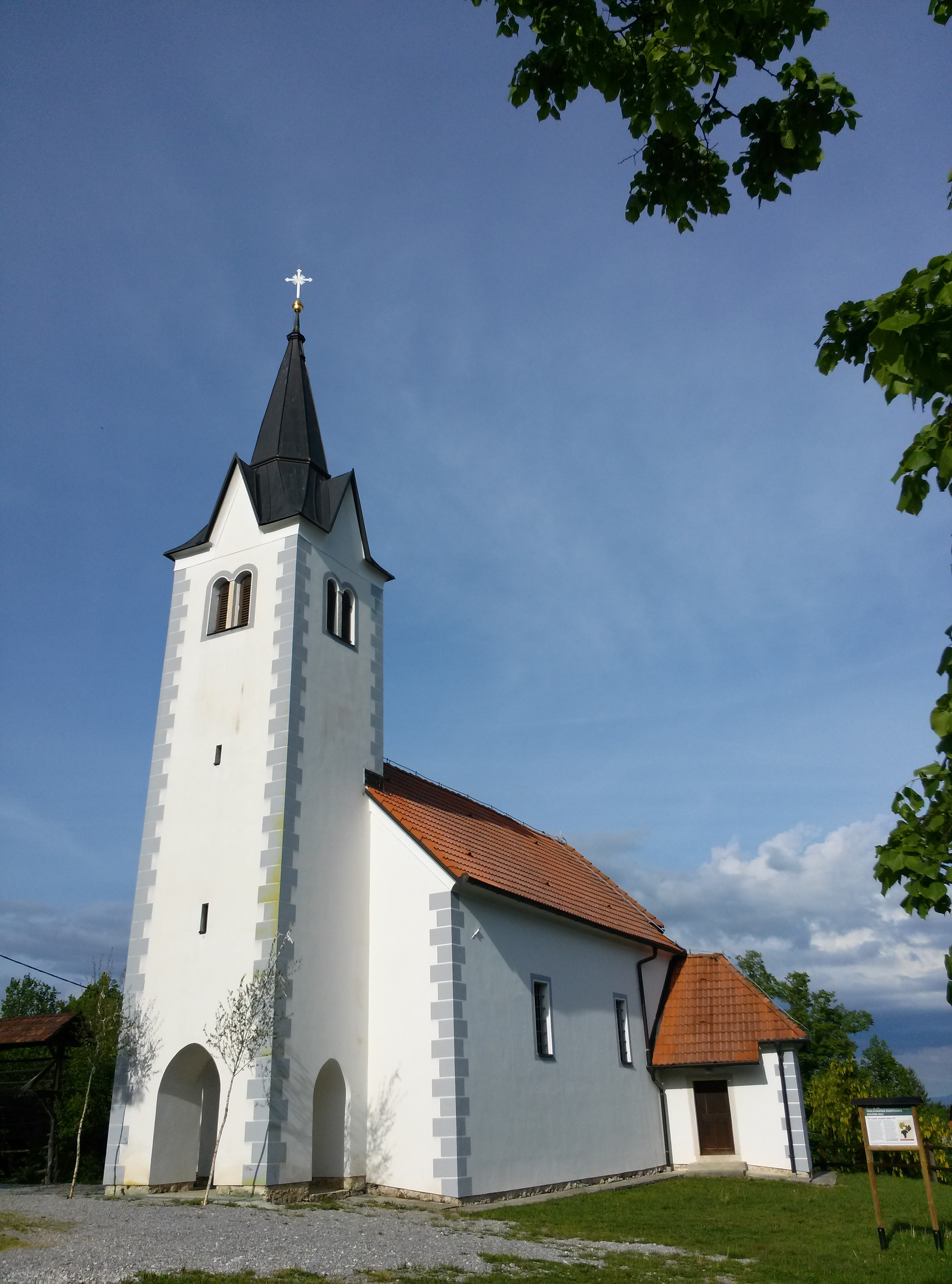
The Church of St. George in Srednje Grčevje.

Srednje Grčevje (pronounced [ˈsɾeːdnjɛ ɡəɾˈtʃeːu̯jɛ]) is a settlement in the hills north of Otočec in the City Municipality of Novo Mesto in southeastern Slovenia. The area is part of the traditional region of Lower Carniola and is now included in the Southeast Slovenia Statistical Region. In January 2026, the population was 97.

The local church is dedicated to Saint George and belongs to the Parish of Šentpeter–Otočec. It was built in the 17th century.
