= Rakovnik pri Birčni Vasi =

- Location in Slovenia
- Coordinates: 45°45′24.24″N 15°10′34.4″E
- Country: Slovenia
- Traditional region: Lower Carniola
- Statistical region: Southeast Slovenia
- Municipality: Novo Mesto

Area
  - Total: 0.773 km^{2} (0.298 sq mi)
- Elevation: 224.6 m (737 ft)

Population (2026)
  - Total: 35
  - Density: 45/km^{2} (120/sq mi)
- Postal code: 8000

Rakovnik pri Birčni Vasi (pronounced [ˈɾaːkɔu̯nik pɾi ˈbiːɾtʃni ˈʋaːsi]; Slovene: Rakovnik pri Birčni vasi) is a small settlement in the hills south of Novo Mesto in southeastern Slovenia. The area is part of the traditional region of Lower Carniola and is now included in the Southeast Slovenia Statistical Region. In January 2026, the population was 35.

== Name ==
The name of the settlement was changed from Rakovnik to Rakovnik pri Birčni vasi in 1953.
