= Konec =

- Interactive map of Konec
- Location in Slovenia
- Coordinates: 45°43′58.86″N 15°12′24.68″E
- Country: Slovenia
- Traditional region: Lower Carniola
- Statistical region: Southwest Slovenia
- Municipality: Novo Mesto

Area
  - Total: 2.892 km^{2} (1.117 sq mi)
- Elevation: 445 m (1,460 ft)

Population (2026)
  - Total: 68
  - Density: 24/km^{2} (62/sq mi)
- Postal code: 8000

Konec (pronounced [ˈkɔːnəts]) is a settlement at the foothills of the Gorjanci range in the City Municipality of Novo Mesto in southeastern Slovenia. The area is part of the traditional region of Lower Carniola and is now included in the Southeast Slovenia Statistical Region. In January 2026, the population was 68.
