= Brezovica pri Stopičah =

- Location in Slovenia
- Coordinates: 45°46′12.46″N 15°13′57.75″E
- Country: Slovenia
- Traditional region: Lower Carniola
- Statistical region: Southeast Slovenia
- Municipality: Novo Mesto

Area
  - Total: 1.12 km^{2} (0.43 sq mi)
- Elevation: 330.7 m (1,085 ft)

Population (2026)
  - Total: 37
  - Density: 33/km^{2} (85/sq mi)
- Postal code: 8000

Brezovica pri Stopičah (pronounced [ˈbɾéːzɔʋitsa pɾi ˈstóːpitʃax]) is a settlement in the City Municipality of Novo Mesto in southeastern Slovenia. The entire municipality is part of the traditional region of Lower Carniola and is now included in the Southeast Slovenia Statistical Region. In January 2026, the population was 37.

== Name ==
The name of the settlement was changed from Brezovica to Brezovica pri Stopičah in 1953.
