= Dobovo =

- Location in Slovenia
- Coordinates: 45°51′15.29″N 15°14′22.21″E
- Country: Slovenia
- Traditional region: Lower Carniola
- Statistical region: Southeast Slovenia
- Municipality: Novo Mesto

Area
  - Total: 0.642 km^{2} (0.248 sq mi)
- Elevation: 189.9 m (623 ft)

Population (2026)
  - Total: 28
  - Density: 44/km^{2} (110/sq mi)
- Postal code: 8000

Dobovo (pronounced [ˈdoːbɔʋɔ]) is a small settlement in the City Municipality of Novo Mesto in southeastern Slovenia. The entire municipality is part of the traditional region of Lower Carniola and is now included in the Southeast Slovenia Statistical Region. In January 2026, the population was 28.
