= Hrušica, Novo Mesto =

Hrušica
- Location in Slovenia
- Coordinates: 45°47′0.34″N 15°14′28.05″E
- Country: Slovenia
- Traditional region: Lower Carniola
- Statistical region: Southeast Slovenia
- Municipality: Novo Mesto

Area
  - Total: 2.056 km^{2} (0.794 sq mi)
- Elevation: 314 m (1,030 ft)

Population (2026)
  - Total: 195
  - Density: 95/km^{2} (250/sq mi)
- Postal code: 8000

Hrušica (pronounced [ˈxɾuːʃitsa]) is a settlement at the foothills of the Gorjanci Range in the City Municipality of Novo Mesto in southeastern Slovenia. The area is part of the traditional region of Lower Carniola and is now included in the Southeast Slovenia Statistical Region. In January 2026, the population was 195.

The local church, built on the southern outskirts of the village, is dedicated to Saint James and belongs to the Parish of Stopiče. It was a medieval building that was extensively restyled in the Baroque style in the 17th century.
