= Sela pri Zajčjem Vrhu =

- Location in Slovenia
- Coordinates: 45°46′28.21″N 15°14′55.68″E
- Country: Slovenia
- Traditional region: Lower Carniola
- Statistical region: Southeast Slovenia
- Municipality: Novo Mesto

Area
  - Total: 0.869 km^{2} (0.336 sq mi)
- Elevation: 341.8 m (1,121 ft)

Population (2026)
  - Total: 73
  - Density: 84/km^{2} (220/sq mi)
- Postal code: 8000

Sela pri Zajčjem Vrhu (pronounced [ˈseːla pɾi ˈzaːi̯tʃjɛɱ ˈʋəɾxu]) is a settlement in the foothills of the Gorjanci range in the City Municipality of Novo Mesto in southeastern Slovenia. The area is part of the traditional region of Lower Carniola and is now included in the Southeast Slovenia Statistical Region. In January 2026, the population was 73.
