= Žihovo Selo =

- Location in Slovenia
- Coordinates: 45°49′39.95″N 15°12′30.59″E
- Country: Slovenia
- Traditional region: Lower Carniola
- Statistical region: Southwest Slovenia
- Municipality: Novo Mesto

Area
  - Total: 0.605 km^{2} (0.234 sq mi)
- Elevation: 177.8 m (583 ft)

Population (2026)
  - Total: 50
  - Density: 83/km^{2} (210/sq mi)
- Postal code: 8000

Žihovo Selo (pronounced [ˈʒiːxɔʋɔ ˈsɛːlɔ]; Slovene: Žihovo selo) is a settlement on the right bank of the Krka River in the City Municipality of Novo Mesto in southeastern Slovenia. The area is part of the traditional region of Lower Carniola and is now included in the Southeast Slovenia Statistical Region. In January 2026, the population was 50.
