= Gorenje Kamence =

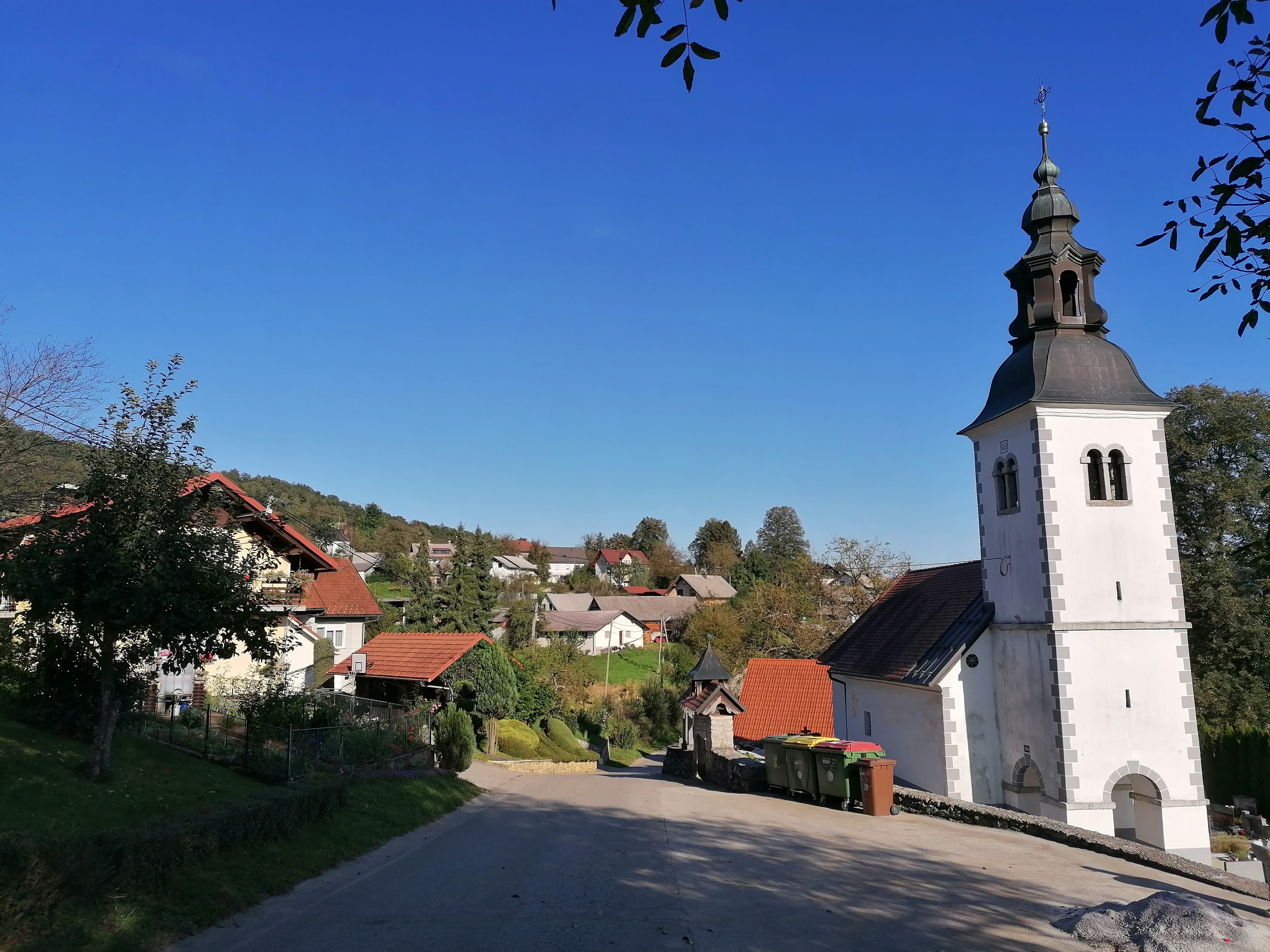

- Location in Slovenia
- Coordinates: 45°50′8.51″N 15°8′25.55″E
- Country: Slovenia
- Traditional region: Lower Carniola
- Statistical region: Southeast Slovenia
- Municipality: Novo Mesto

Area
  - Total: 1.32 km^{2} (0.51 sq mi)
- Elevation: 217.9 m (715 ft)

Population (2026)
  - Total: 146
  - Density: 111/km^{2} (290/sq mi)
- Postal code: 8000

Gorenje Kamence (pronounced [ɡɔˈɾeːnjɛ ˈkaːmɛntsɛ]) is a settlement north of the town of Novo Mesto in southeastern Slovenia. The entire City Municipality of Novo Mesto is part of the traditional region of Lower Carniola and is now included in the Southeast Slovenia Statistical Region. In January 2026, the population was 146.

The local church is dedicated to the Holy Cross and belongs to the Parish of Novo Mesto–Sveti Janez. It is a medieval building that was restyled in the Baroque in the 17th and 18th centuries.
