= Urban Municipality of Novo Mesto =

Urban municipality of Slovenia

Urban Municipality of Novo Mesto Mestna občina Novo mesto
- Municipality
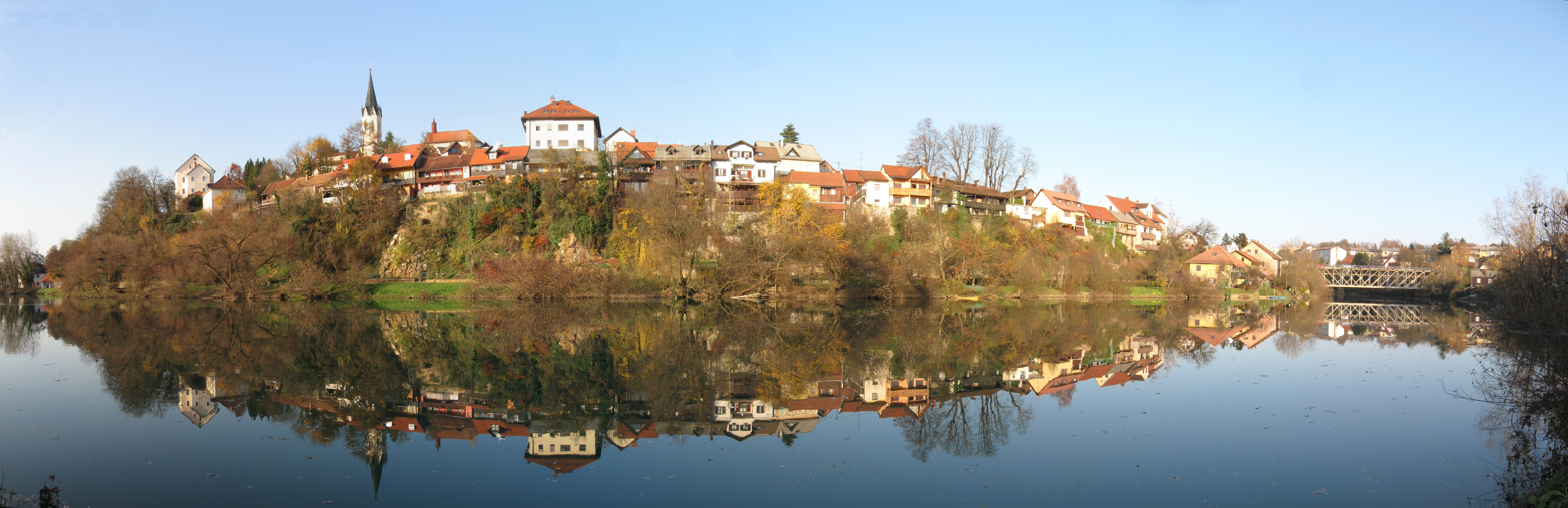

- Coat of arms

- Location of the Municipality of Novo Mesto in Slovenia
- Coordinates: 45°48′N 15°10′E
- Country: Slovenia

Government
  - Mayor: Gregor Macedoni (Independent)

Area
  - Municipality: 298.5 km^{2} (115.3 sq mi)

Population (2011)
  - Municipality: 36,296
  - Density: 121.6/km^{2} (314.9/sq mi)
  - Urban: 23,341
- Time zone: UTC+01 (CET)
  - Summer (DST): UTC+02 (CEST)
- Website: www.novomesto.si
- Source: Statistical Office of the Republic of Slovenia, census of 2002.

The Urban Municipality of Novo Mesto (pronounced [ˈnɔːʋɔ ˈmeːstɔ]; Slovene: Mestna občina Novo mesto) is a municipality in southeastern Slovenia, close to the border with Croatia. The seat of the municipality is the city of Novo Mesto. The Municipality of Novo Mesto is part of the Southeast Slovenia Statistical Region. It borders Croatia on the Gorjanci Hills.

== Geography ==
The total municipal area is 298.5 square kilometres (115.3 sq mi), located on a bend of the Krka River.

=== Local communities ===
The municipality is divided into the local communities (Slovene: krajevne skupnosti) of Birčna Vas, Bršljin, Brusnice, Bučna Vas, Center, Dolž, Drska, Gabrje, Gotna Vas, Kandija–Grm, Karteljevo, Ločna–Mačkovec, Majde Šilc, Mali Slatnik, Mestne Njive, Otočec, Podgrad, Prečna, Regrča Vas, Šmihel, Stopiče, Uršna Sela, and Žabja Vas.

=== Settlements ===
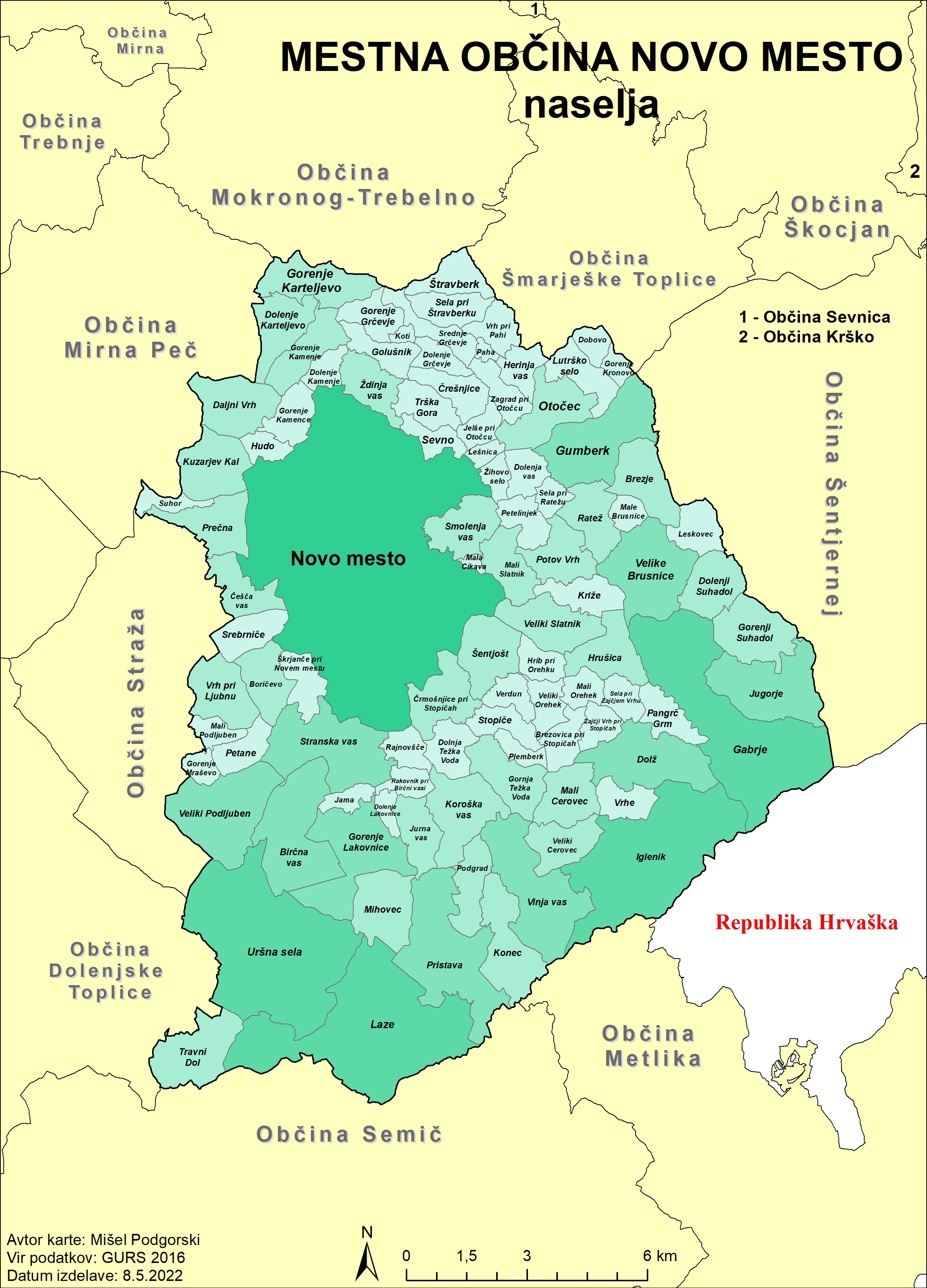
Villages in the municipality

In addition to the municipal seat of Novo Mesto, the municipality also includes the following settlements:

- Birčna Vas
- Boričevo
- Brezje
- Brezovica pri Stopičah
- Češča Vas
- Črešnjice
- Črmošnjice pri Stopičah
- Daljni Vrh
- Dobovo
- Dolenja Vas
- Dolenje Grčevje
- Dolenje Kamenje
- Dolenje Karteljevo
- Dolenje Lakovnice
- Dolenji Suhadol
- Dolnja Težka Voda
- Dolž
- Gabrje
- Golušnik
- Gorenje Grčevje
- Gorenje Kamence
- Gorenje Kamenje
- Gorenje Karteljevo
- Gorenje Kronovo
- Gorenje Lakovnice
- Gorenje Mraševo
- Gorenji Suhadol
- Gornja Težka Voda
- Gumberk
- Herinja Vas
- Hrib pri Orehku
- Hrušica
- Hudo
- Iglenik
- Jama
- Jelše pri Otočcu
- Jugorje
- Jurna Vas
- Konec
- Koroška Vas
- Koti
- Križe
- Kuzarjev Kal
- Laze
- Leskovec
- Lešnica
- Lutrško Selo
- Mala Cikava
- Male Brusnice
- Mali Cerovec
- Mali Orehek
- Mali Podljuben
- Mali Slatnik
- Mihovec
- Otočec
- Paha
- Pangrč Grm
- Petane
- Petelinjek
- Plemberk
- Podgrad
- Potov Vrh
- Prečna
- Pristava
- Rajnovšče
- Rakovnik pri Birčni Vasi
- Ratež
- Sela pri Ratežu
- Sela pri Zajčjem Vrhu
- Sela pri Štravberku
- Šentjošt
- Sevno
- Škrjanče pri Novem Mestu
- Smolenja Vas
- Srebrniče
- Srednje Grčevje
- Stopiče
- Stranska Vas
- Štravberk
- Suhor
- Travni Dol
- Trška Gora
- Uršna Sela
- Velike Brusnice
- Veliki Cerovec
- Veliki Orehek
- Veliki Podljuben
- Veliki Slatnik
- Verdun
- Vinja Vas
- Vrh pri Ljubnu
- Vrh pri Pahi
- Vrhe
- Zagrad pri Otočcu
- Zajčji Vrh pri Stopičah
- Ždinja Vas
- Žihovo Selo

=== Former settlements ===
In 1923, Kandija was annexed to Novo Mesto.

In 1979, the following settlements were annexed to Novo Mesto: Brod (at the time of the 1971 census, the settlement had 247 inhabitants), Bršljin (520), Cegelnica pri Novem Mestu (307), Dolenje Kamence (316), Gotna Vas (470), Groblje (34), Irča Vas (376), Jedinščica (132), Krka (141), Ločna (246), Mačkovec pod Trško Goro (192), Mala Bučna Vas (239), Muhaber (288), Potočna Vas (113), Ragovo (95), Regrča Vas (587), Šmihel pri Novem Mestu (504), Velika Bučna Vas (185), Velika Cikava (51), and Žabja Vas (761).

== Demographics ==
According to the census of 2002, the municipality has 40,925 inhabitants, 20,017 male and 20,908 female. The average age of the inhabitants is 39.58. There are a total of 13,796 households and 11,408 families. The Urban Municipality of Novo Mesto has a working-age population of 19,579, of whom 2,118 are unemployed. The average gross monthly wage in August 2003 was €1,099.27 (263,432 tolars) and the average net monthly wage was €687.90 (164,851 tolars). There are 1,725 students in the municipality.

== Economy ==
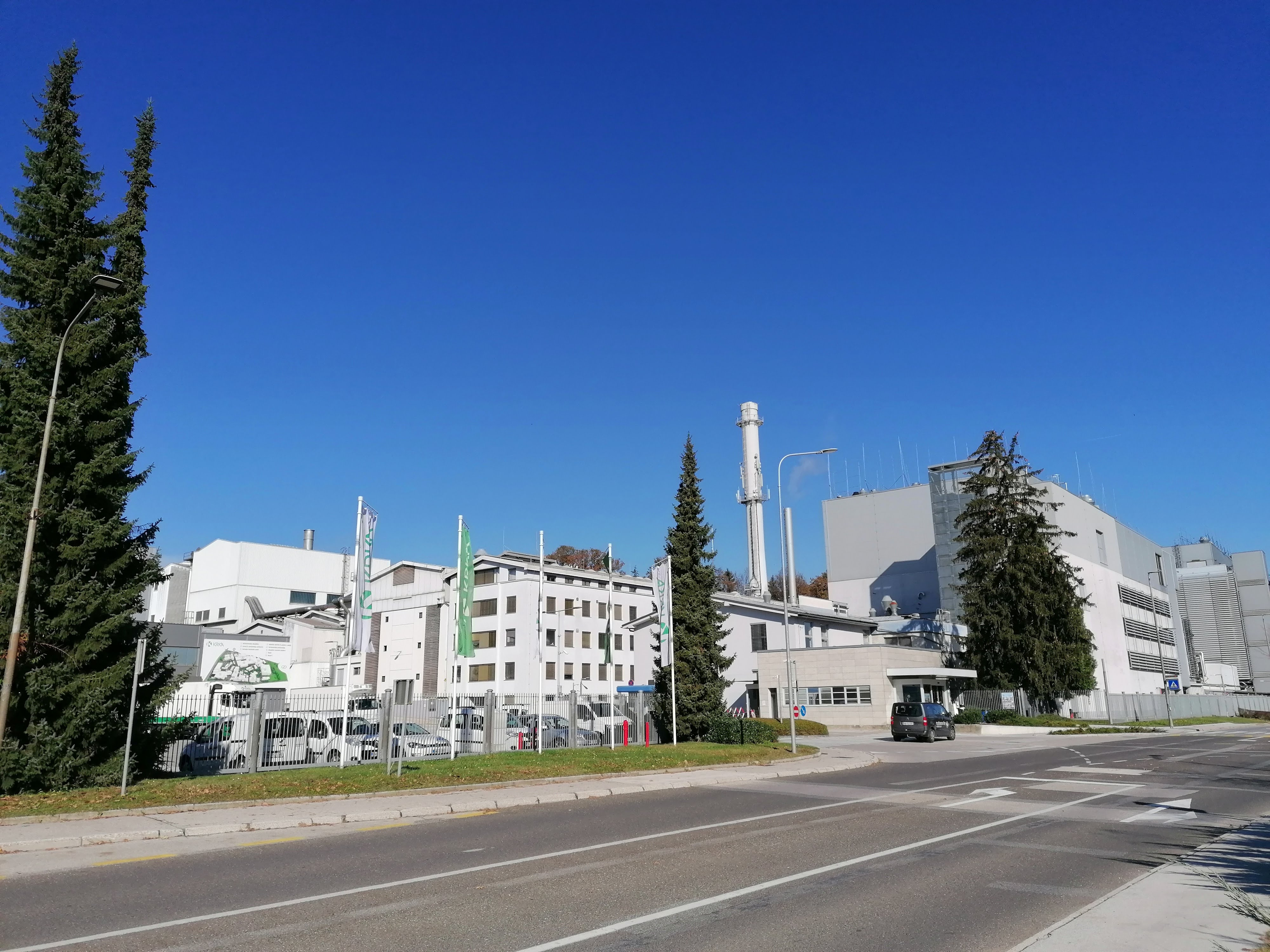
Krka headquarters in Novo Mesto

Today, tourism is increasing in Slovenia, and Novo Mesto is feeling some of the effects of this. The Krka Valley is becoming a place for wine enthusiasts who take tours throughout the Lower Carniola region, tasting locally produced Cviček wine, which is produced by blending several different varieties of local wine.

Major industries include:

- REVOZ (ex Industrija motornih vozil), car manufacturing
- Adria Mobil, caravaning
- Krka (company), pharmaceuticals

== See also ==
- Krka Basketball Club
- Langenhagen – the twin city of Novo Mesto
- Novo Mesto Grammar School
