= Dolž =

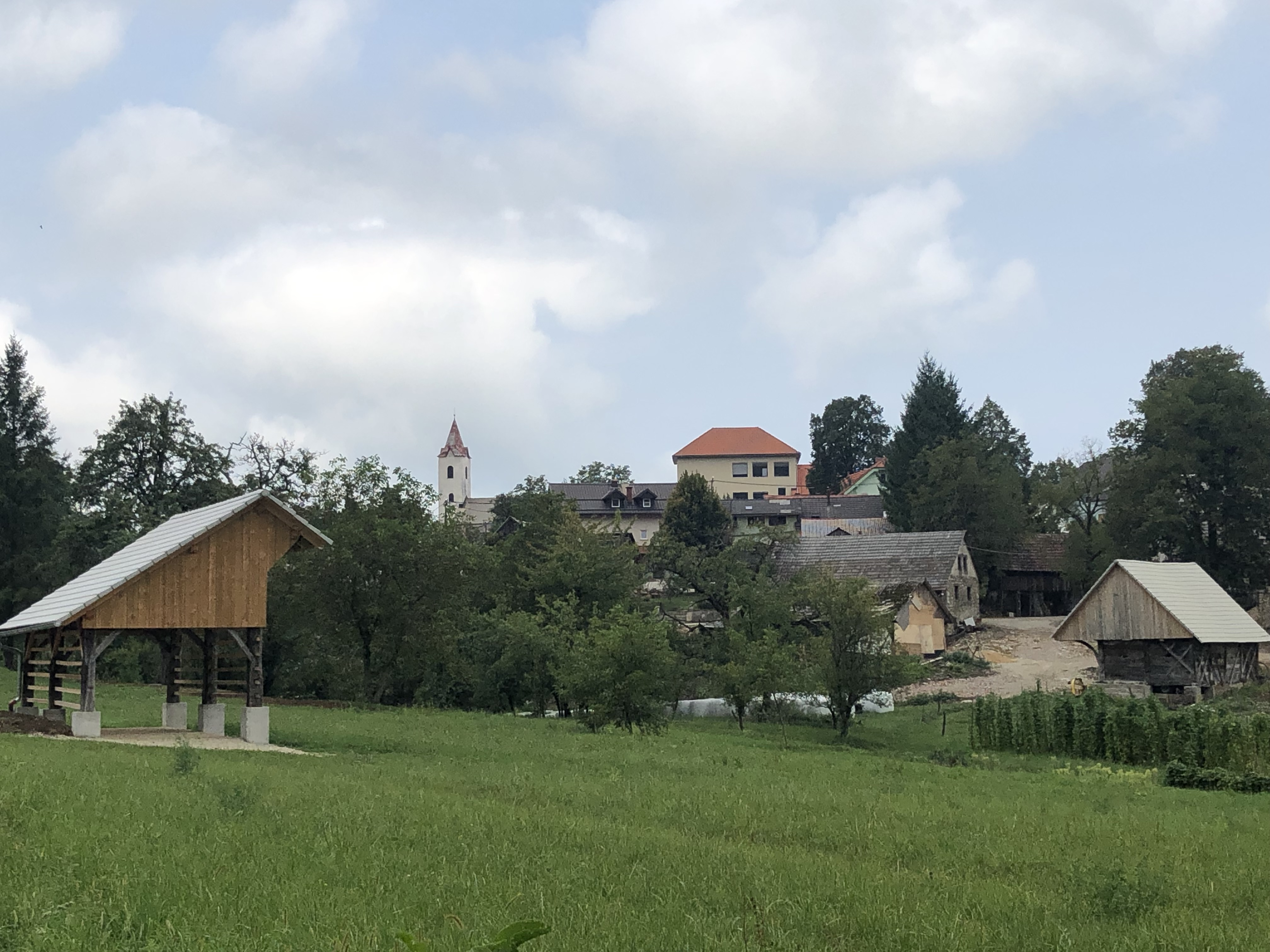
- View from the south

- Location in Slovenia
- Coordinates: 45°45′36.06″N 15°14′55.91″E
- Country: Slovenia
- Traditional region: Lower Carniola
- Statistical region: Southeast Slovenia
- Municipality: Novo Mesto

Area
  - Total: 3.745 km^{2} (1.446 sq mi)
- Elevation: 407.5 m (1,337 ft)

Population (2026)
  - Total: 327
  - Density: 87/km^{2} (230/sq mi)
- Postal code: 8000

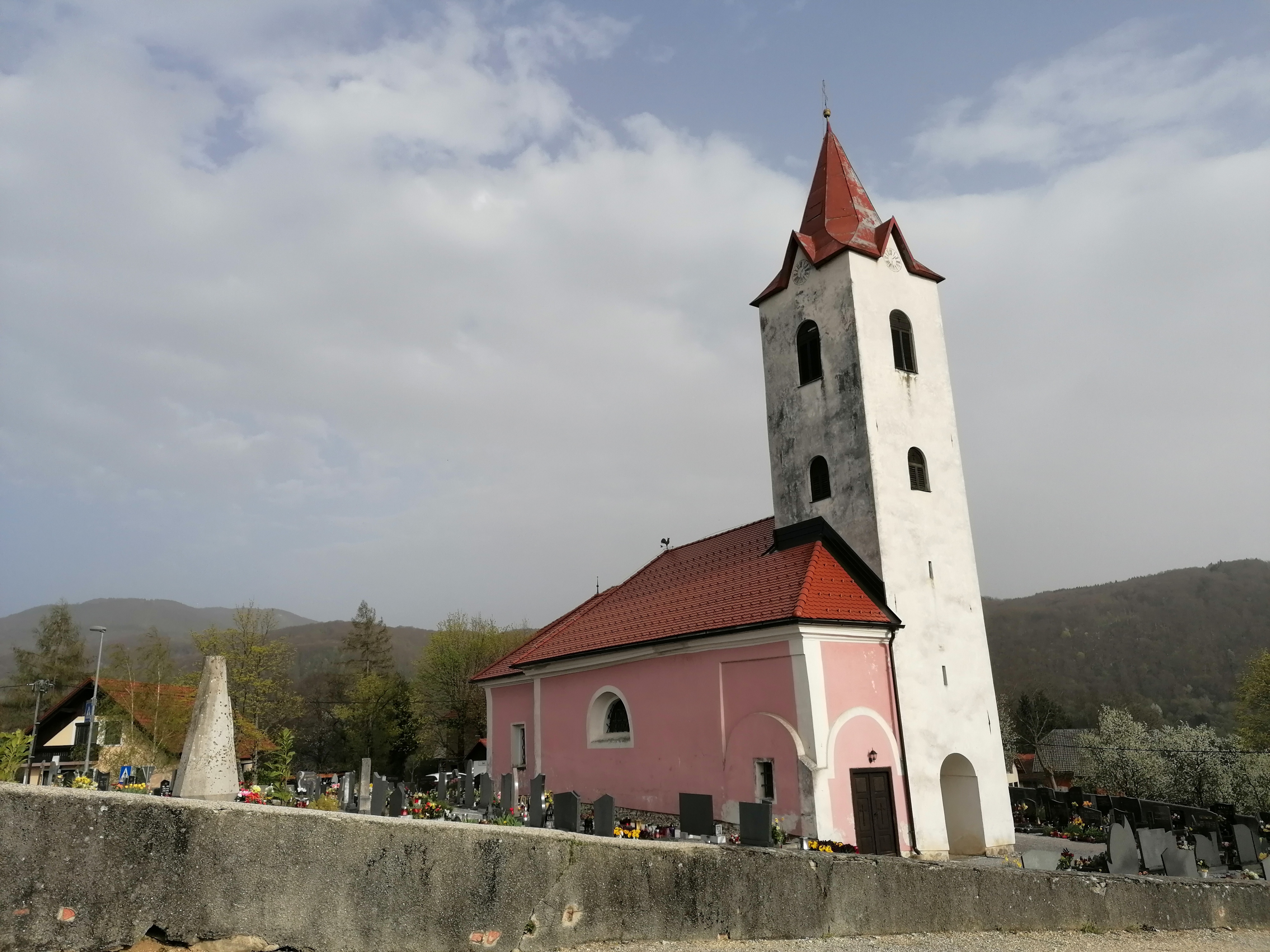
Church Saints Cosmas and Damian

Dolž (pronounced [ˈdoːu̯ʃ]) is a settlement in the hills southeast of Novo Mesto in southeastern Slovenia, close to the border with Croatia. The entire area is part of the traditional region of Lower Carniola and is now included in the Southeast Slovenia Statistical Region. In January 2026, the population was 327.

The local church is dedicated to Saints Cosmas and Damian and belongs to the Parish of Stopiče. It was built in the mid-18th century.
