= Iglenik, Novo Mesto =

Iglenik
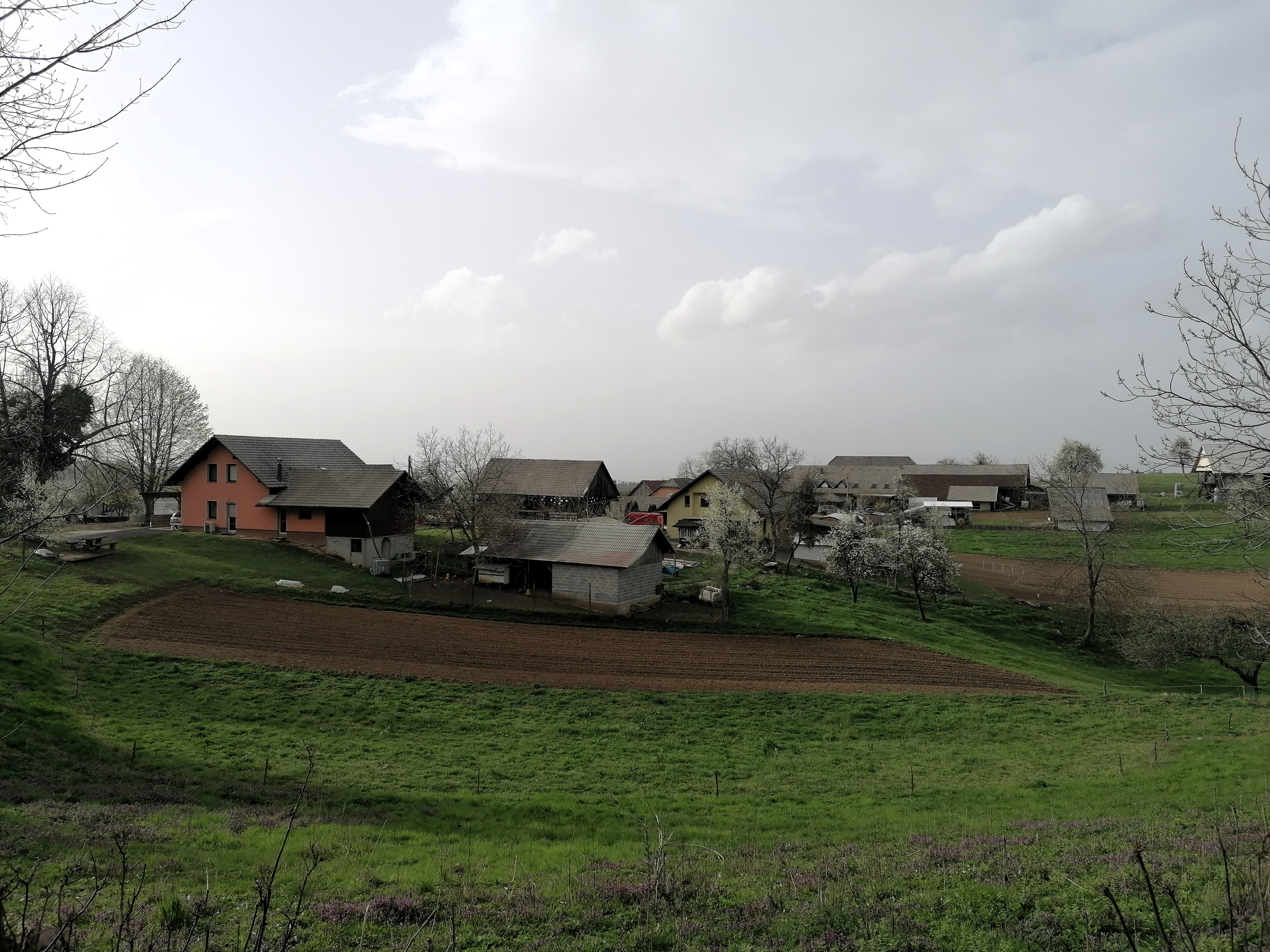

- Location in Slovenia
- Coordinates: 45°44′37.45″N 15°14′46.4″E
- Country: Slovenia
- Traditional region: Lower Carniola
- Statistical region: Southeast Slovenia
- Municipality: Novo Mesto

Area
  - Total: 9.522 km^{2} (3.676 sq mi)
- Elevation: 441.8 m (1,449 ft)

Population (2026)
  - Total: 35
  - Density: 4/km^{2} (10/sq mi)
- Postal code: 8000

Iglenik (pronounced [iˈɡleːnik]) is a settlement in the Gorjanci Mountains in the City Municipality of Novo Mesto in southeastern Slovenia, close to the border with Croatia. The area is part of the traditional region of Lower Carniola and is now included in the Southeast Slovenia Statistical Region. In January 2026, the population was 35.
