= Boričevo =

- Location in Slovenia
- Coordinates: 45°46′49.65″N 15°8′0.51″E
- Country: Slovenia
- Traditional region: Lower Carniola
- Statistical region: Southeast Slovenia
- Municipality: Novo Mesto

Area
  - Total: 1.766 km^{2} (0.682 sq mi)
- Elevation: 196.1 m (643 ft)

Population (2026)
  - Total: 29
  - Density: 16/km^{2} (41/sq mi)
- Postal code: 8000

Boričevo (pronounced [bɔˈɾiːtʃɛʋɔ]) is a settlement in the City Municipality of Novo Mesto in southeastern Slovenia. It lies in the hills southwest of the town of Novo Mesto. It is part of the traditional region of Lower Carniola and is now included in the Southeast Slovenia Statistical Region. In January 2026, the population was 29.

== Name ==
Boričevo was attested in written sources as Boriczha in 1368, Gorischew in 1477, and Boritschew in 1498, among other spellings.
