= Zagrad pri Otočcu =

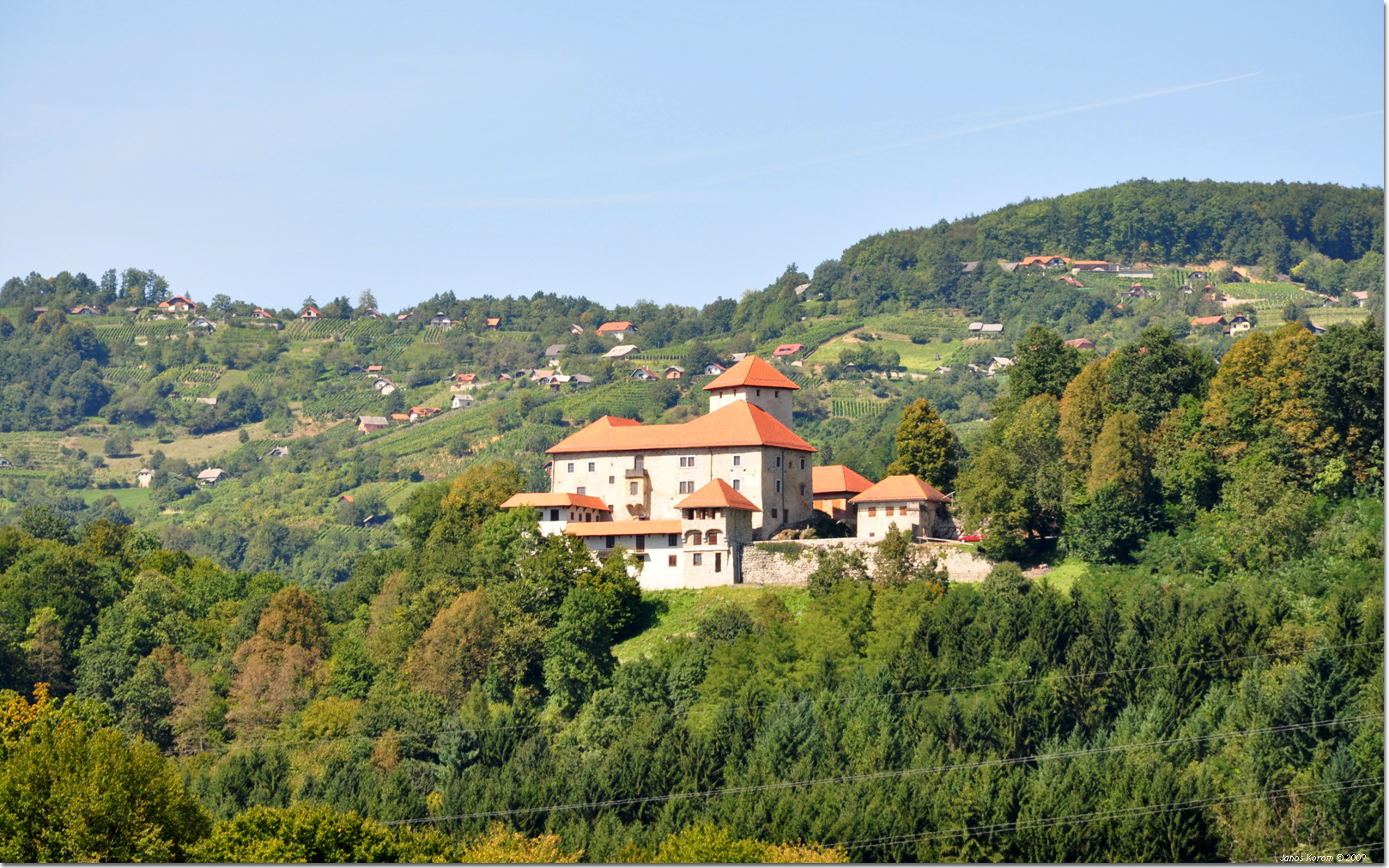

- Location in Slovenia
- Coordinates: 45°50′54.47″N 15°12′21.14″E
- Country: Slovenia
- Traditional region: Lower Carniola
- Statistical region: Southeast Slovenia
- Municipality: Novo Mesto

Area
  - Total: 0.933 km^{2} (0.360 sq mi)
- Elevation: 294.4 m (966 ft)

Population (2026)
  - Total: 60
  - Density: 64/km^{2} (170/sq mi)
- Postal code: 8000

Zagrad pri Otočcu (pronounced [ˈzaːɡɾat pɾi ɔˈtoːtʃtsu]) is a small settlement in the hills north of Otočec in the City Municipality of Novo Mesto in southeastern Slovenia. The area is part of the traditional region of Lower Carniola and is now included in the Southeast Slovenia Statistical Region. In January 2026, the population was 60.

== Name ==
The name of the settlement was changed from Zagrad to Zagrad pri Otočcu in 1953.
