= Ždinja Vas =

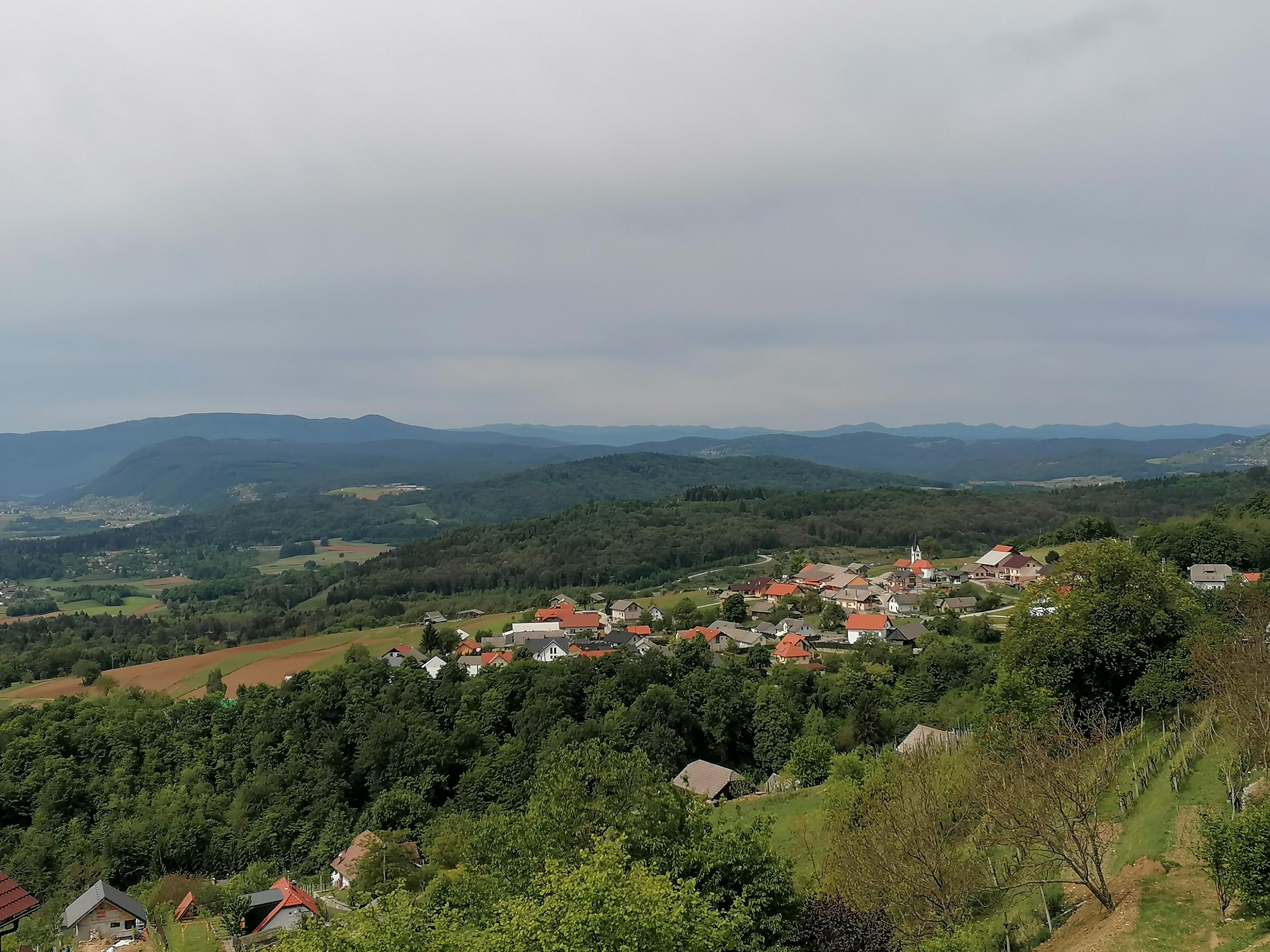

- Location in Slovenia
- Coordinates: 45°50′47.88″N 15°10′9.94″E
- Country: Slovenia
- Traditional region: Lower Carniola
- Statistical region: Southeast Slovenia
- Municipality: Novo Mesto

Area
  - Total: 1.694 km^{2} (0.654 sq mi)
- Elevation: 382.8 m (1,256 ft)

Population (2026)
  - Total: 309
  - Density: 182/km^{2} (470/sq mi)
- Postal code: 8000

Ždinja Vas (pronounced [ˈʒdiːnja ˈʋaːs]; Slovene: Ždinja vas, German: Seidendorf) is a settlement in the hills north of Novo Mesto in southeastern Slovenia. The area is part of the traditional region of Lower Carniola and is now included in the Southeast Slovenia Statistical Region. In January 2026, the population was 309.

== Name ==
Ždinja Vas was attested in historical sources as Sigilsdorff and Sitingisdorff in 1145, Sittichendorff in 1250, Sydingendorf in 1252, and Sidigendorff in 1321, among other spellings. Based on the medieval attestations, the name may be derived from *Židihnja vas 'Jewish village'.

== Church ==
The local church, built on the southern outskirts of the village, is dedicated to Saint James and belongs to the Parish of Šentpeter, Otočec. It was a medieval building that was extensively restyled in the Baroque style in the mid-17th century.
