= Mali Podljuben =

- Location in Slovenia
- Coordinates: 45°46′0.15″N 15°6′58.36″E
- Country: Slovenia
- Traditional region: Lower Carniola
- Statistical region: Southeast Slovenia
- Municipality: Novo Mesto

Area
  - Total: 0.693 km^{2} (0.268 sq mi)
- Elevation: 203.2 m (667 ft)

Population (2026)
  - Total: 30
  - Density: 43/km^{2} (110/sq mi)
- Postal code: 8000

Mali Podljuben (pronounced [ˈmaːli pɔdˈljuːbən]) is a settlement in the hills southwest of Novo Mesto in southeastern Slovenia. The area is part of the traditional region of Lower Carniola and is now included in the Southeast Slovenia Statistical Region. In January 2026, the population was 30.
