= Križe, Novo Mesto =

Križe
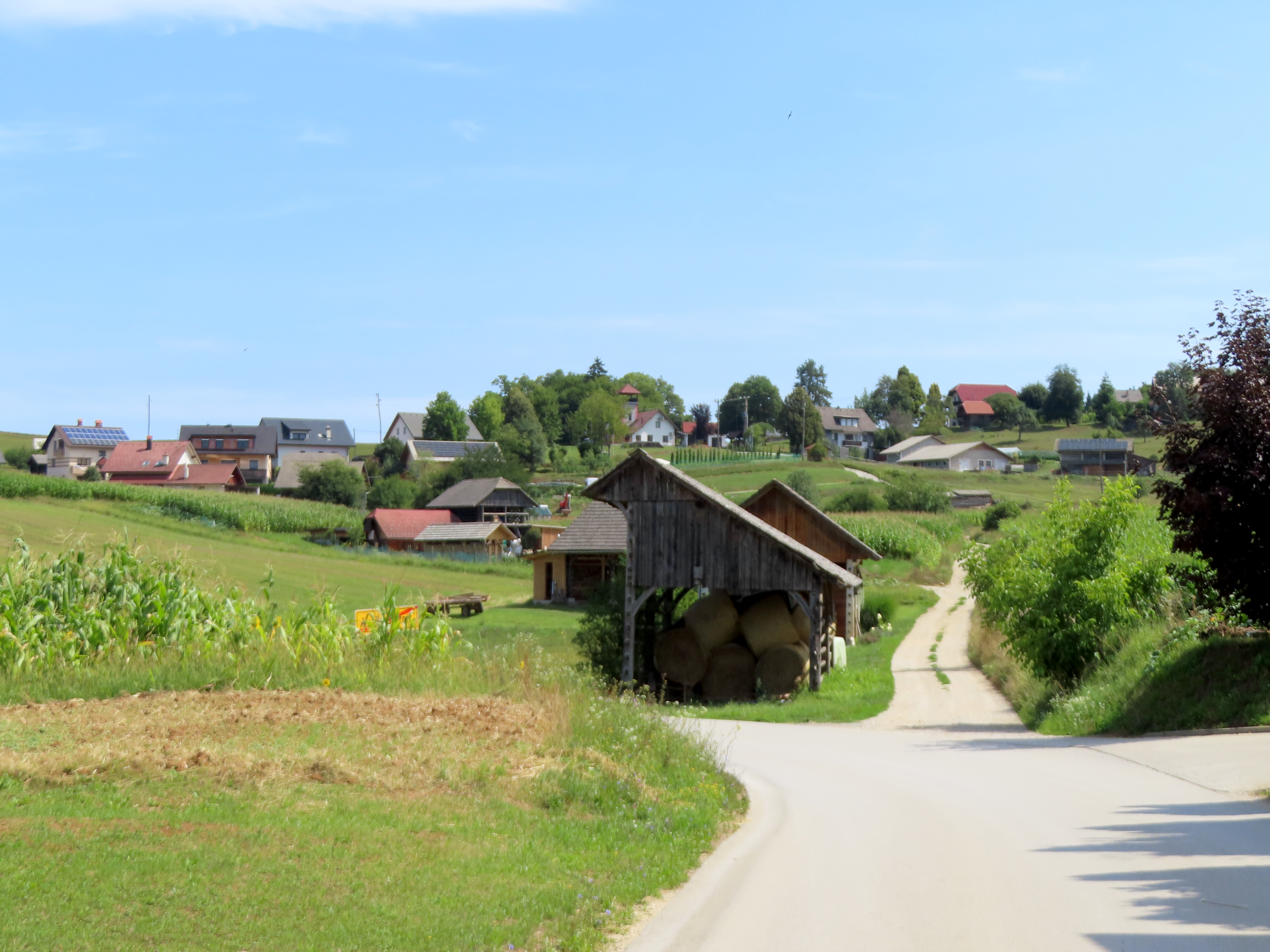

- Location in Slovenia
- Coordinates: 45°47′57.05″N 15°14′19.03″E
- Country: Slovenia
- Traditional region: Lower Carniola
- Statistical region: Southeast Slovenia
- Municipality: Novo Mesto

Area
  - Total: 1.446 km^{2} (0.558 sq mi)
- Elevation: 252.5 m (828 ft)

Population (2026)
  - Total: 154
  - Density: 107/km^{2} (280/sq mi)
- Postal code: 8000

Križe (pronounced [ˈkɾiːʒɛ]) is a settlement in the hills east of the town of Novo Mesto in southeastern Slovenia. The area is part of the traditional region of Lower Carniola and is now included in the Southeast Slovenia Statistical Region. In January 2026, the population was 154.
