= Jugorje, Novo Mesto =

Jugorje
- Location in Slovenia
- Coordinates: 45°46′42.21″N 15°16′44.54″E
- Country: Slovenia
- Traditional region: Lower Carniola
- Statistical region: Southeast Slovenia
- Municipality: Novo Mesto

Area
  - Total: 3.906 km^{2} (1.508 sq mi)
- Elevation: 449 m (1,473 ft)

Population (2026)
  - Total: 62
  - Density: 16/km^{2} (41/sq mi)
- Postal code: 8321

Jugorje (pronounced [ˈjuːɡɔɾjɛ]) is a settlement east of Gabrje in the Gorjanci Mountains in the City Municipality of Novo Mesto in southeastern Slovenia. The area is part of the traditional region of Lower Carniola and is now included in the Southeast Slovenia Statistical Region. In January 2026, the population was 62.
