= Koti, Novo Mesto =

Koti
- Location in Slovenia
- Coordinates: 45°51′25.73″N 15°10′44.36″E
- Country: Slovenia
- Traditional region: Lower Carniola
- Statistical region: Southeast Slovenia
- Municipality: Novo Mesto

Area
  - Total: 0.218 km^{2} (0.084 sq mi)
- Elevation: 379.2 m (1,244 ft)

Population (2026)
  - Total: 13
  - Density: 60/km^{2} (160/sq mi)
- Postal code: 8000

Koti (pronounced [ˈkoːti]) is a small settlement in the hills north of the town of Novo Mesto in southeastern Slovenia. The area is part of the traditional region of Lower Carniola and is now included in the Southeast Slovenia Statistical Region. In January 2026, the population was 13.
