= Daljni Vrh =

- Location in Slovenia
- Coordinates: 45°50′21.18″N 15°7′54.07″E
- Country: Slovenia
- Traditional region: Lower Carniola
- Statistical region: Southeast Slovenia
- Municipality: Novo Mesto

Area
  - Total: 2.484 km^{2} (0.959 sq mi)
- Elevation: 285 m (935 ft)

Population (2026)
  - Total: 107
  - Density: 43/km^{2} (110/sq mi)
- Postal code: 8000

Daljni Vrh (pronounced [ˈdaːlni ˈʋəɾx]) is a settlement in the hills northwest of the town of Novo Mesto in southeastern Slovenia. The entire City Municipality of Novo Mesto lies in the traditional region of Lower Carniola and is now included in the Southeast Slovenia Statistical Region. In January 2026, the population was 107.
