= Dolenje Lakovnice =

- Location in Slovenia
- Coordinates: 45°45′6.77″N 15°10′18.61″E
- Country: Slovenia
- Traditional region: Lower Carniola
- Statistical region: Southeast Slovenia
- Municipality: Novo Mesto

Area
  - Total: 0.464 km^{2} (0.179 sq mi)
- Elevation: 263.4 m (864 ft)

Population (2026)
  - Total: 69
  - Density: 149/km^{2} (390/sq mi)
- Postal code: 8000

Dolenje Lakovnice (pronounced [dɔˈleːnjɛ ˈlaːkɔu̯nitsɛ]) is a settlement in the hills south of Novo Mesto in southeastern Slovenia. The entire City Municipality of Novo Mesto lies in the traditional region of Lower Carniola and is now included in the Southeast Slovenia Statistical Region. In January 2026, the population was 69.
