= Vrh pri Pahi =

- Location in Slovenia
- Coordinates: 45°51′24.24″N 15°12′39.79″E
- Country: Slovenia
- Traditional region: Lower Carniola
- Statistical region: Southeast Slovenia
- Municipality: Novo Mesto

Area
  - Total: 1.110 km^{2} (0.429 sq mi)
- Elevation: 381.4 m (1,251 ft)

Population (2026)
  - Total: 99
  - Density: 89/km^{2} (230/sq mi)
- Postal code: 8000

Vrh pri Pahi (pronounced [ˈʋəɾx pɾi ˈpaːxi]) is a small settlement in the hills north of Otočec in the City Municipality of Novo Mesto in southeastern Slovenia. The area is part of the traditional region of Lower Carniola and is now included in the Southeast Slovenia Statistical Region.

The settlement was formed in 1953 by merging the former settlements of Dolenji Vrh and Gorenji Vrh, which a that time belonged to the Municipality of Trška Gora in the Novo mesto District. In January 2026, the population was 99.
