= Sela pri Štravberku =

- Location in Slovenia
- Coordinates: 45°51′38.62″N 15°11′25.2″E
- Country: Slovenia
- Traditional region: Lower Carniola
- Statistical region: Southeast Slovenia
- Municipality: Novo Mesto

Area
  - Total: 1.395 km^{2} (0.539 sq mi)
- Elevation: 486.1 m (1,595 ft)

Population (2026)
  - Total: 6
  - Density: 4/km^{2} (10/sq mi)
- Postal code: 8222

Sela pri Štravberku (pronounced [ˈseːla pɾi ˈʃtaːu̯bɛɾku]) is a small settlement in the hills north of Novo Mesto in southeastern Slovenia. The area is part of the traditional region of Lower Carniola and is now included in the Southeast Slovenia Statistical Region. In January 2026, the population was 6.

== Name ==
The name of the settlement was changed from Sela to Sela pri Štravberku in 1952.

== Cultural heritage ==
In 2006, a Bronze Age settlement was found in the area.
