= Kuzarjev Kal =

- Location in Slovenia
- Coordinates: 45°49′23.27″N 15°6′49.06″E
- Country: Slovenia
- Traditional region: Lower Carniola
- Statistical region: Southeast Slovenia
- Municipality: Novo Mesto

Area
  - Total: 2.426 km^{2} (0.937 sq mi)
- Elevation: 343.6 m (1,127 ft)

Population (2026)
  - Total: 64
  - Density: 26/km^{2} (67/sq mi)
- Postal code: 8000

Kuzarjev Kal (pronounced [ˈkuːzaɾjɛu̯ ˈkaːu̯]) is a settlement in the hills northwest of Novo Mesto in southeastern Slovenia. The area is part of the traditional region of Lower Carniola and is now included in the Southeast Slovenia Statistical Region. In January 2026, the population was 64.
