= Ratež =

- Location in Slovenia
- Coordinates: 45°49′6.4″N 15°14′6.36″E
- Country: Slovenia
- Traditional region: Lower Carniola
- Statistical region: Southeast Slovenia
- Municipality: Novo Mesto

Area
  - Total: 1.889 km^{2} (0.729 sq mi)
- Elevation: 182.7 m (599 ft)

Population (2026)
  - Total: 397
  - Density: 210/km^{2} (540/sq mi)
- Postal code: 8321

Ratež (pronounced [ˈɾaːtɛʃ]) is a settlement in the hills east of Novo Mesto in southeastern Slovenia. The area is part of the traditional region of Lower Carniola and is now included in the Southeast Slovenia Statistical Region. In January 2026, the population was 397.
