= Smolenja Vas =

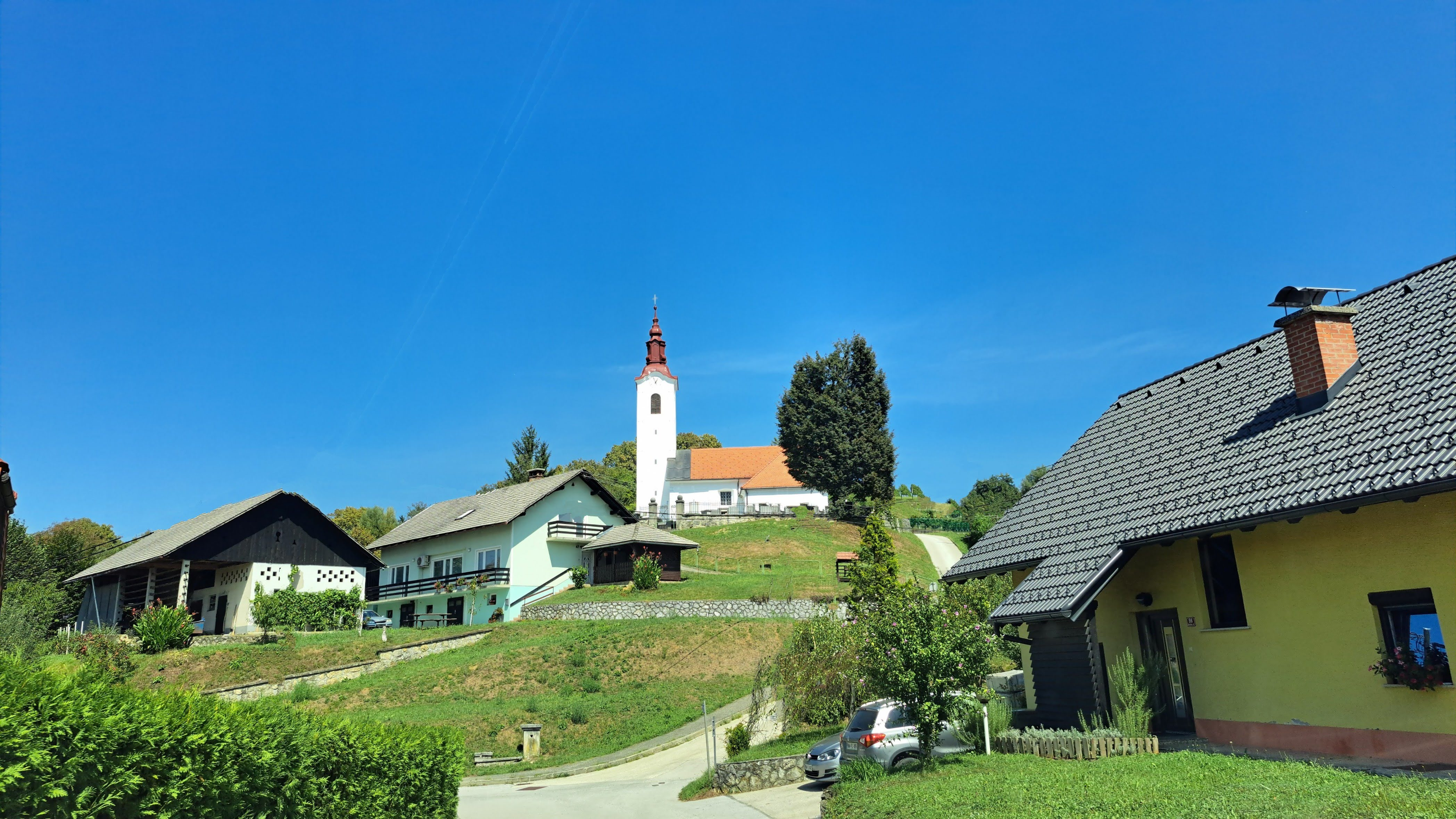

- Location in Slovenia
- Coordinates: 45°48′31.01″N 15°11′58.83″E
- Country: Slovenia
- Traditional region: Lower Carniola
- Statistical region: Southeast Slovenia
- Municipality: Novo Mesto

Area
  - Total: 2.009 km^{2} (0.776 sq mi)
- Elevation: 184.9 m (607 ft)

Population (2026)
  - Total: 538
  - Density: 268/km^{2} (690/sq mi)
- Postal code: 8000

Smolenja Vas (pronounced [smɔˈleːnja ˈʋaːs]; Slovene: Smolenja vas) is a village in the hills northeast of Novo Mesto in southeastern Slovenia. The area is part of the traditional region of Lower Carniola and is now included in the Southeast Slovenia Statistical Region. In January 2026, the population was 538.

The local church, built on the northern outskirts of the village, is dedicated to the Assumption of Mary and belongs to the Parish of Novo Mesto–Sveti Lenart. It was a medieval building that was extensively restyled in the Baroque style in 1644.
