= Sevno, Novo Mesto =

Sevno Sevno na Trški gori (until 1993)
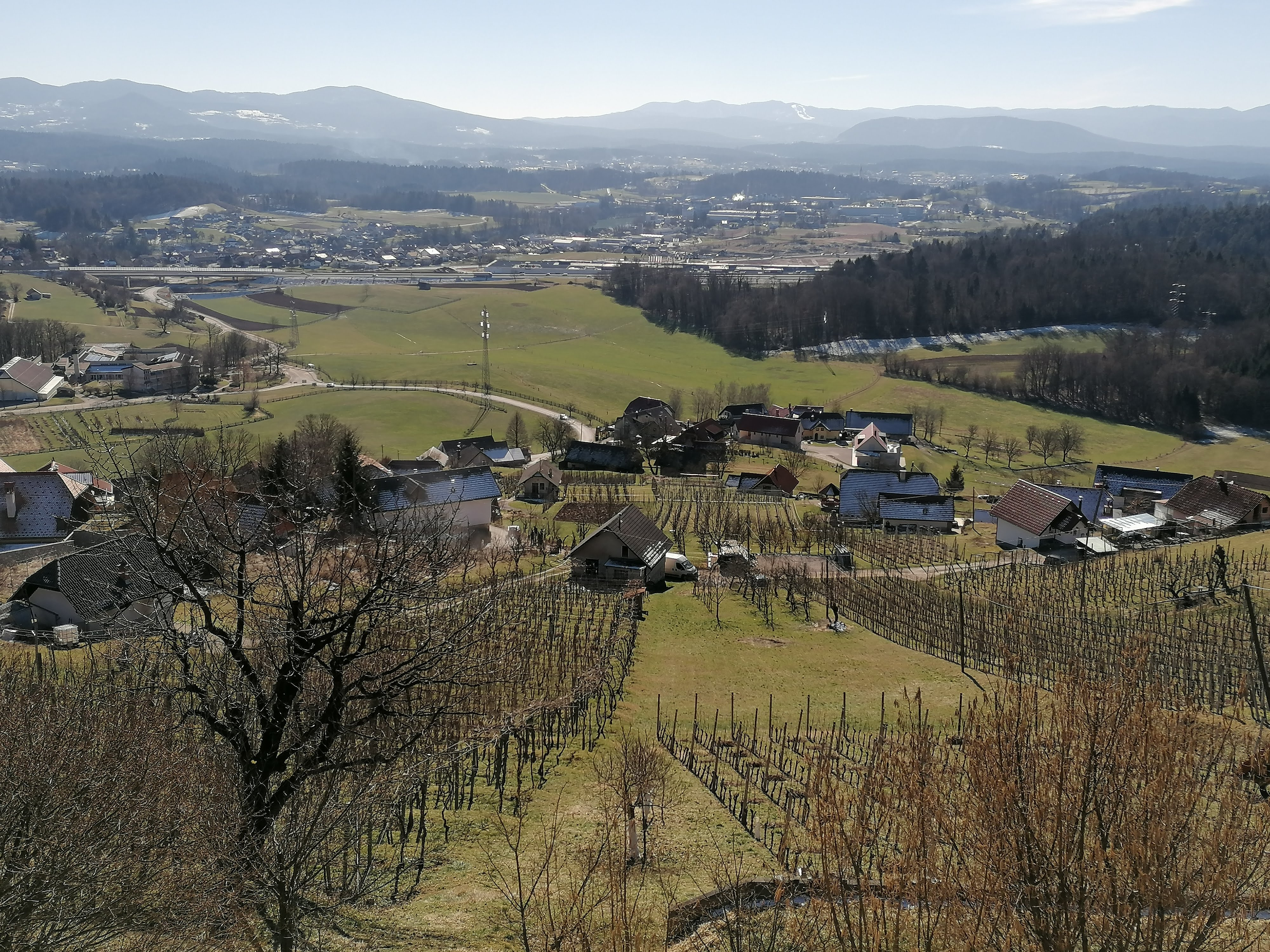

- Location in Slovenia
- Coordinates: 45°50′5.67″N 15°11′14.69″E
- Country: Slovenia
- Traditional region: Lower Carniola
- Statistical region: Southeast Slovenia
- Municipality: Novo Mesto

Area
  - Total: 0.888 km^{2} (0.343 sq mi)
- Elevation: 223.6 m (734 ft)

Population (2026)
  - Total: 69
  - Density: 78/km^{2} (200/sq mi)
- Postal code: 8000

Sevno (pronounced [ˈseːu̯nɔ]) is a settlement northeast of Novo Mesto in southeastern Slovenia. The area is part of the traditional region of Lower Carniola and is now included in the Southeast Slovenia Statistical Region. In January 2026, the population was 69.

== Name ==
The name of the settlement was changed from Sevno na Trški gori to Sevno in 1993.
