= Šmihel pri Novem Mestu =

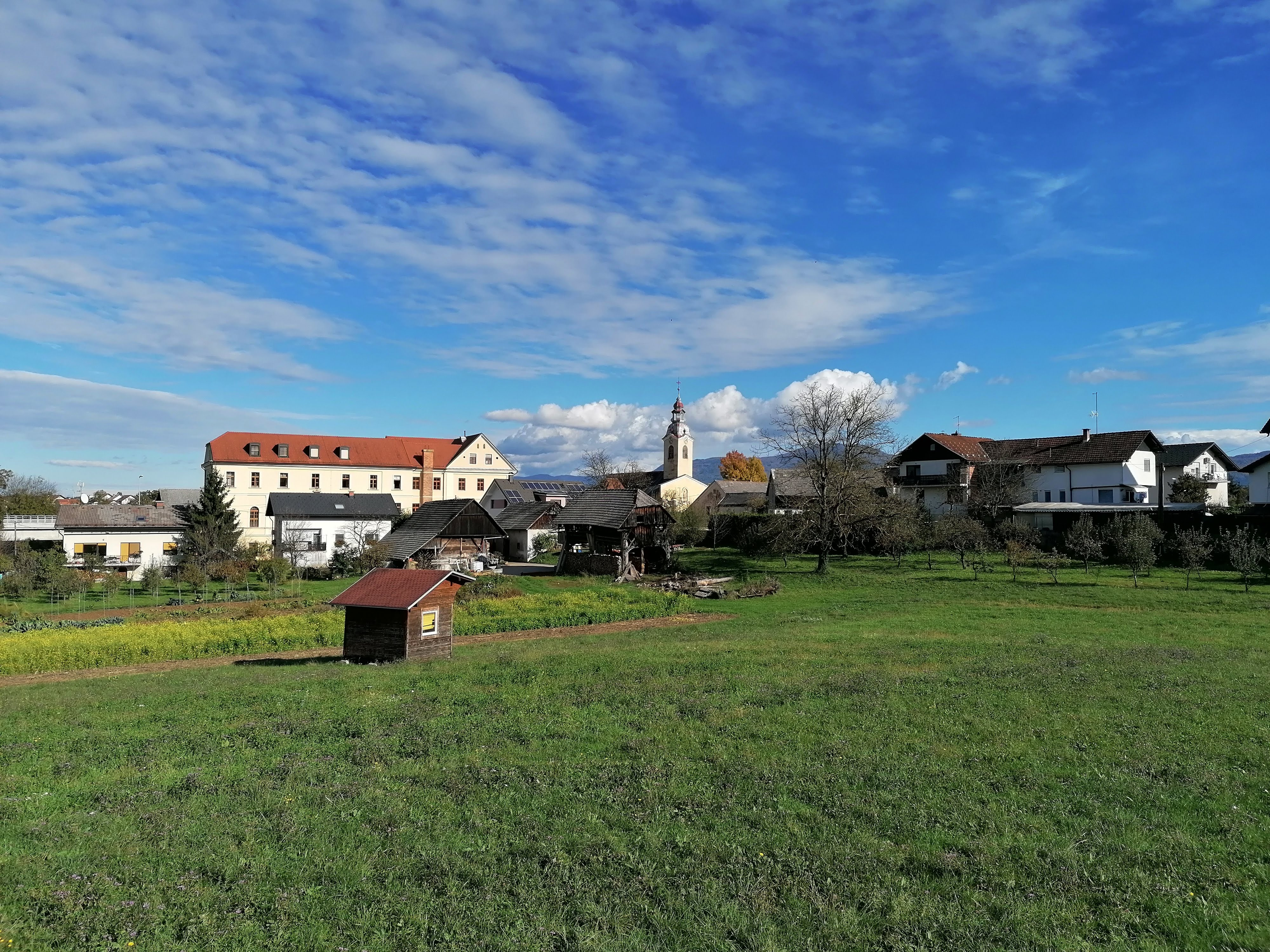
- Šmihel (2020)

- Location in Slovenia
- Coordinates: 45°47′30.33″N 15°10′4.7″E
- Country: Slovenia
- Traditional region: Lower Carniola
- Statistical region: Southwest Slovenia
- Municipality: Novo Mesto

Šmihel pri Novem Mestu (pronounced [ʃmiˈxeːu̯ pɾi ˈnɔːʋɛm ˈmeːstu]; Slovene: Šmihel pri Novem mestu) is a former village in southeastern Slovenia in the City Municipality of Novo Mesto. It was annexed by the city of Novo Mesto in 1979, ending its existence as an independent settlement.

== Name ==
The name Šmihel is derived from *šent Mihael 'Saint Michael' (via *Šm̩mihel) and refers to the parish church in the settlement. The name of the village was changed from Šmihel to Šmihel pri Novem mestu in 1952.
