= Šentjošt, Novo Mesto =

Šentjošt
- Location in Slovenia
- Coordinates: 45°46′51.82″N 15°12′32.73″E
- Country: Slovenia
- Traditional region: Lower Carniola
- Statistical region: Southeast Slovenia
- Municipality: Novo Mesto

Area
  - Total: 2.299 km^{2} (0.888 sq mi)
- Elevation: 211.4 m (694 ft)

Population (2026)
  - Total: 97
  - Density: 42/km^{2} (110/sq mi)
- Postal code: 8000

Šentjošt (pronounced [ʃɛnˈtjóːʃt, ʃənˈ-]) is a settlement in the hills southeast of Novo Mesto in southeastern Slovenia. The area is part of the traditional region of Lower Carniola and is now included in the Southeast Slovenia Statistical Region. In January 2026, the population was 97.

The local church, from which the settlement also gets its name, is dedicated to Saint Judoc (Slovene: sveti Jošt) and belongs to the Parish of Stopiče. It is a 16th-century building that was extensively restyled in the early 19th century.
