= Dolenji Suhadol =

- Location in Slovenia
- Coordinates: 45°48′20.69″N 15°16′43.18″E
- Country: Slovenia
- Traditional region: Lower Carniola
- Statistical region: Southeast Slovenia
- Municipality: Novo Mesto

Area
  - Total: 1.929 km^{2} (0.745 sq mi)
- Elevation: 325.5 m (1,068 ft)

Population (2026)
  - Total: 131
  - Density: 68/km^{2} (180/sq mi)
- Postal code: 8000

Dolenji Suhadol (pronounced [dɔˈleːnji suxaˈdoːu̯] or [dɔˈleːnji suˈxaːdɔu̯]) is a settlement in the hills east of Novo Mesto in southeastern Slovenia. The entire City Municipality of Novo Mesto lies in the traditional region of Lower Carniola and is now included in the Southeast Slovenia Statistical Region. In January 2026, the population was 131.
