= Črmošnjice pri Stopičah =

- Location in Slovenia
- Coordinates: 45°46′26.69″N 15°11′36.21″E
- Country: Slovenia
- Traditional region: Lower Carniola
- Statistical region: Southeast Slovenia
- Municipality: Novo Mesto

Area
  - Total: 2.222 km^{2} (0.858 sq mi)
- Elevation: 195 m (640 ft)

Population (2026)
  - Total: 348
  - Density: 157/km^{2} (410/sq mi)
- Postal code: 8000

Črmošnjice pri Stopičah (pronounced [tʃəɾmɔˈʃnjìːtsɛ pɾi ˈstóːpitʃax, -njíː-]) is a settlement south of Novo Mesto in southeastern Slovenia. The entire City Municipality of Novo Mesto lies in the traditional region of Lower Carniola and is now included in the Southeast Slovenia Statistical Region. In January 2026, the population was 348.

== Name ==
The name of the settlement was changed from Črmošnjice to Črmošnjice pri Stopičah in 1955.

== Church ==
The local church, built outside the village to the north, is dedicated to Mary Magdalene and belongs to the Parish of Stopiče. It dates to the late 16th century.
