= Gorenji Suhadol =

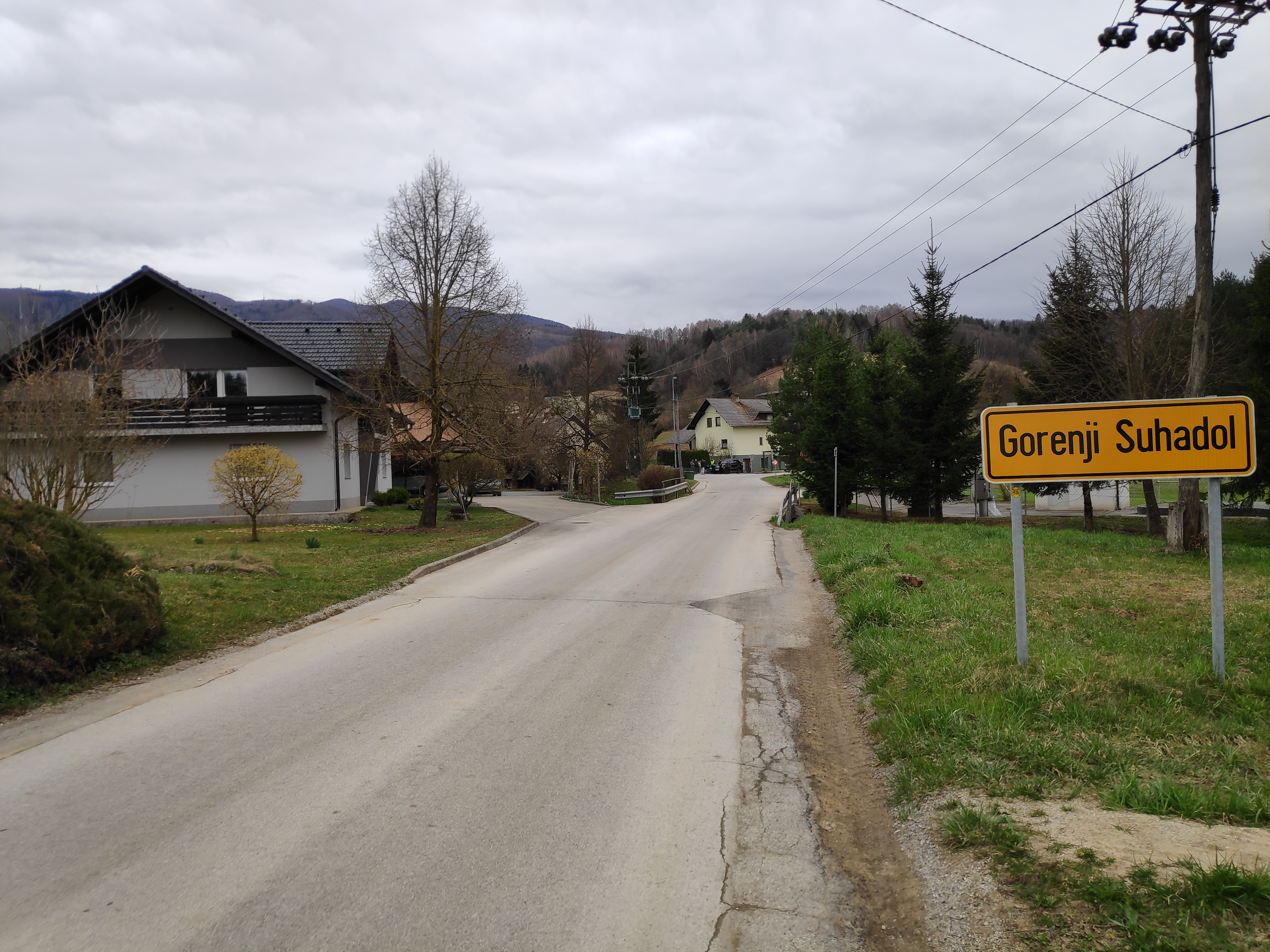

- Location in Slovenia
- Coordinates: 45°47′24.89″N 15°17′18.56″E
- Country: Slovenia
- Traditional region: Lower Carniola
- Statistical region: Southeast Slovenia
- Municipality: Novo Mesto

Area
  - Total: 2.571 km^{2} (0.993 sq mi)
- Elevation: 349.2 m (1,146 ft)

Population (2026)
  - Total: 69
  - Density: 27/km^{2} (70/sq mi)
- Postal code: 8321

Gorenji Suhadol (pronounced [ɡɔˈɾeːnji suxaˈdoːu̯] or [- suˈxaːdɔu̯]) is a settlement in the foothills of the Gorjanci Range in the City Municipality of Novo Mesto in southeastern Slovenia. The area is part of the traditional region of Lower Carniola and is now included in the Southeast Slovenia Statistical Region. In January 2026, the population was 69.
