= Water castle =

Castle that is largely defended by water

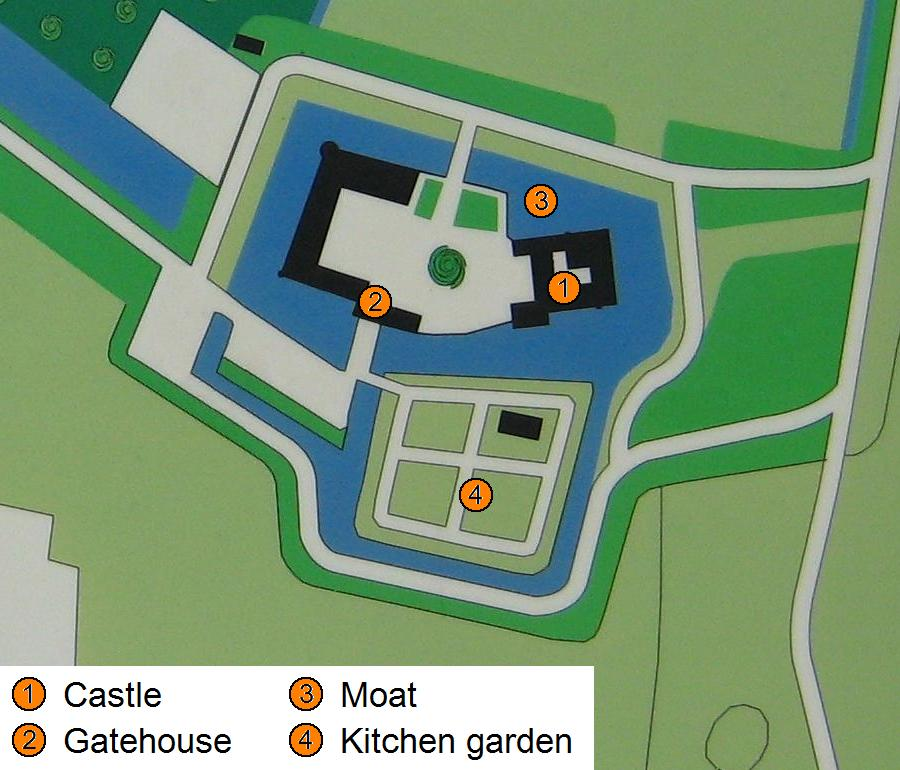
Plan of Doorwerth Castle (Gelderland, the Netherlands)

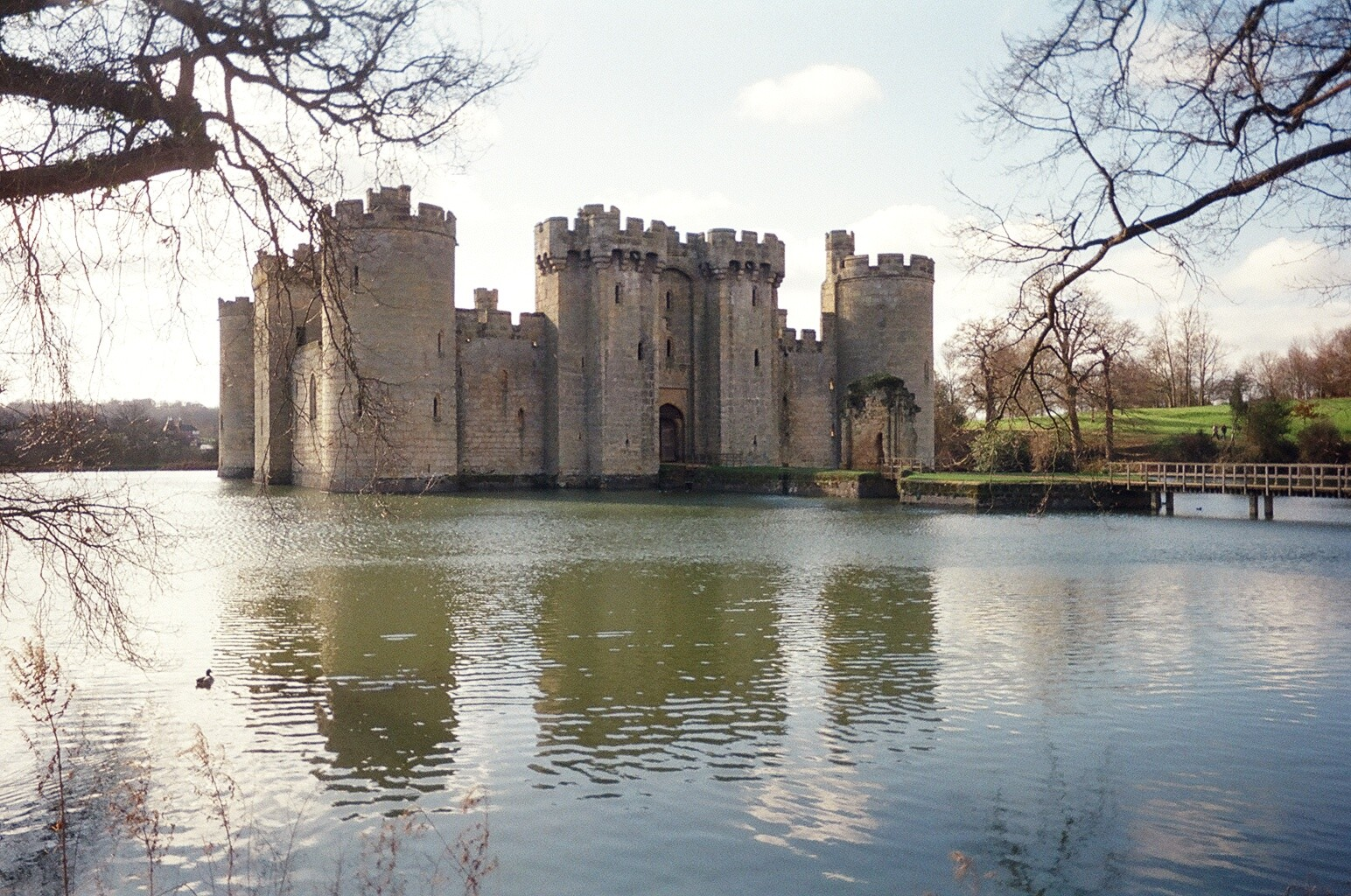
Bodiam Castle (Sussex, England)

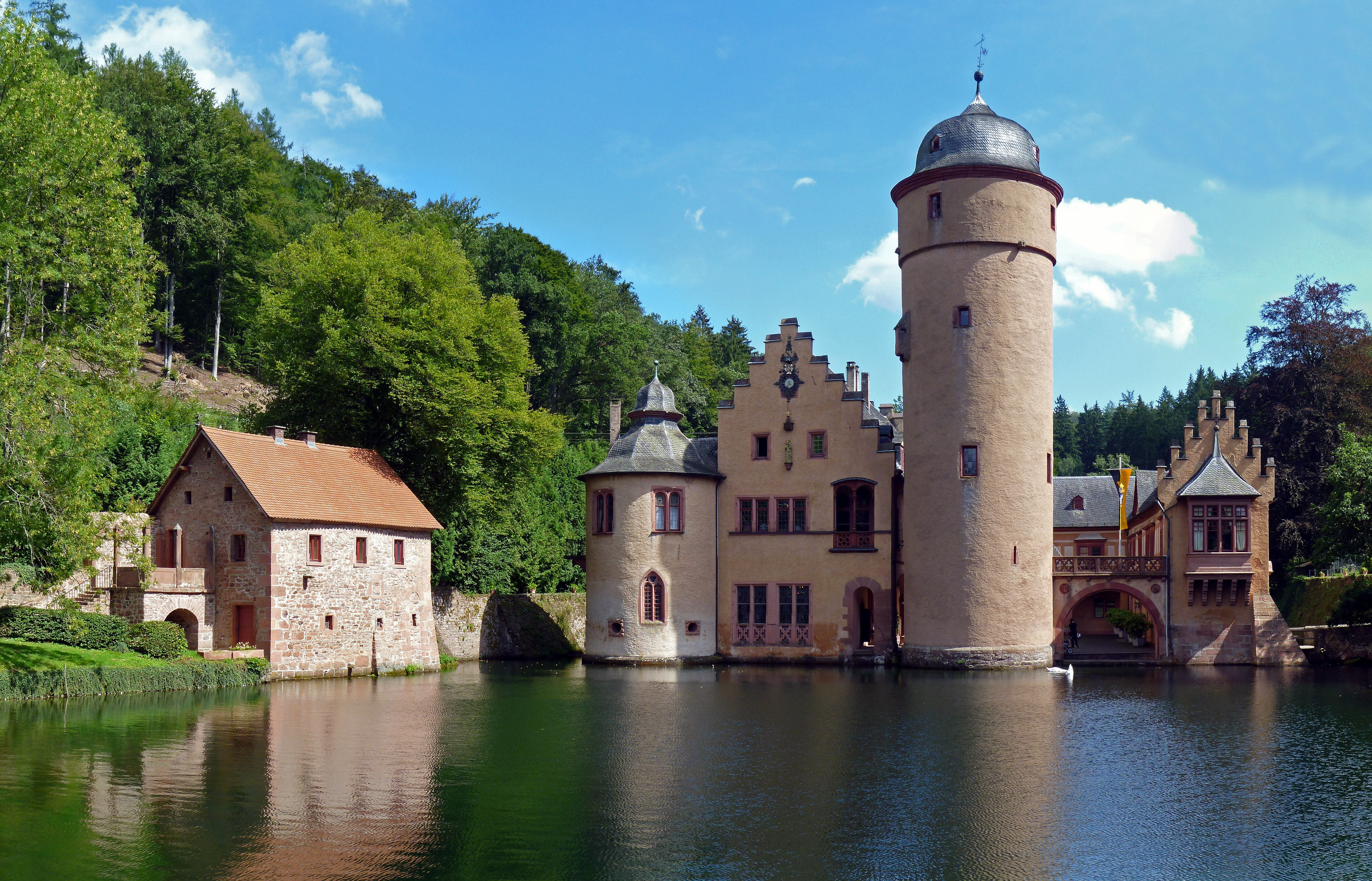
Mespelbrunn Castle (Bavaria, Germany)

A water castle, sometimes water-castle, (Note: See e.g. Gothein (2014)) is a castle which incorporates a natural or artificial body of water into its defences. It can be entirely surrounded by water-filled moats (moated castle) or natural waterbodies such as island castles in a river or offshore. The term comes from European castle studies, mainly German Burgenkunde. Some interpretations of the category emphasise that the use of water extends beyond a defensive purpose. When stately homes were built in such a location, or a Wasserburg was later rebuilt as a residential manor, the German term becomes Wasserschloss, lit. "water palace/manor".

== Description ==
Forde-Johnston describes such a site as "a castle in which water plays a prominent part in the defences." Apart from hindering attackers, an abundant supply of water was also an advantage during a siege. Topographically, such structures are a type of low-lying castle. Such a castle usually had only one entrance, which was via a drawbridge and that could be raised for protection in the event of an attack.

There is a further distinction between:

- castles that are protected by artificial water-filled moats or man-made ponds, i.e. moated castles
- castles whose primary means of protection is from natural water bodies such as river courses, or which stand on islands or peninsulas in a natural marshland, pond, lake or sea. Island castles and marsh castles are such examples.

== Legacy ==
In many places in Central Europe castles that had formerly been fortified changed their role or were converted over the course of time so that they became largely representational and residential buildings. The characteristic moats thus lost their original security function, but were retained in some cases as an element of landscaping. Today, in monument conservation circles, they are often described as burdensome, cost-intensive "historic legacies" because of the water damage caused to their foundations. As a result, many moats around castles in Germany have been drained, or more rarely filled, especially since the 1960s.

In Germany, the Wasserburgroute or "Water Castle Route" has been established in the triangle formed by the cities of Aachen, Bonn and Cologne which links 120 castles and palaces.

== Examples ==
=== Austria ===
- Franzensburg

=== Baltic ===
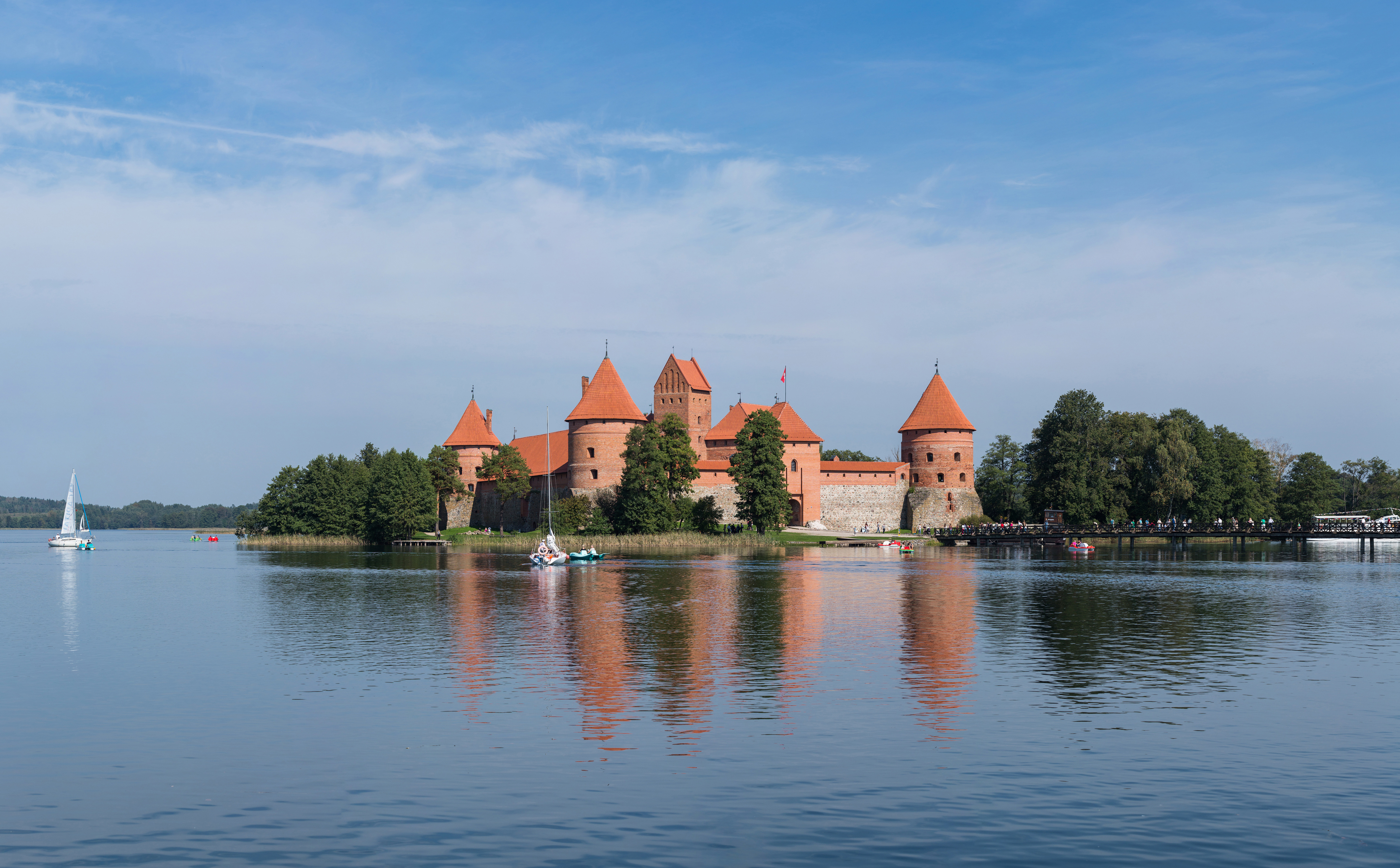
Trakai Castle

- Āraiši (Arrasch)
- Trakai Island Castle

=== Belgium ===
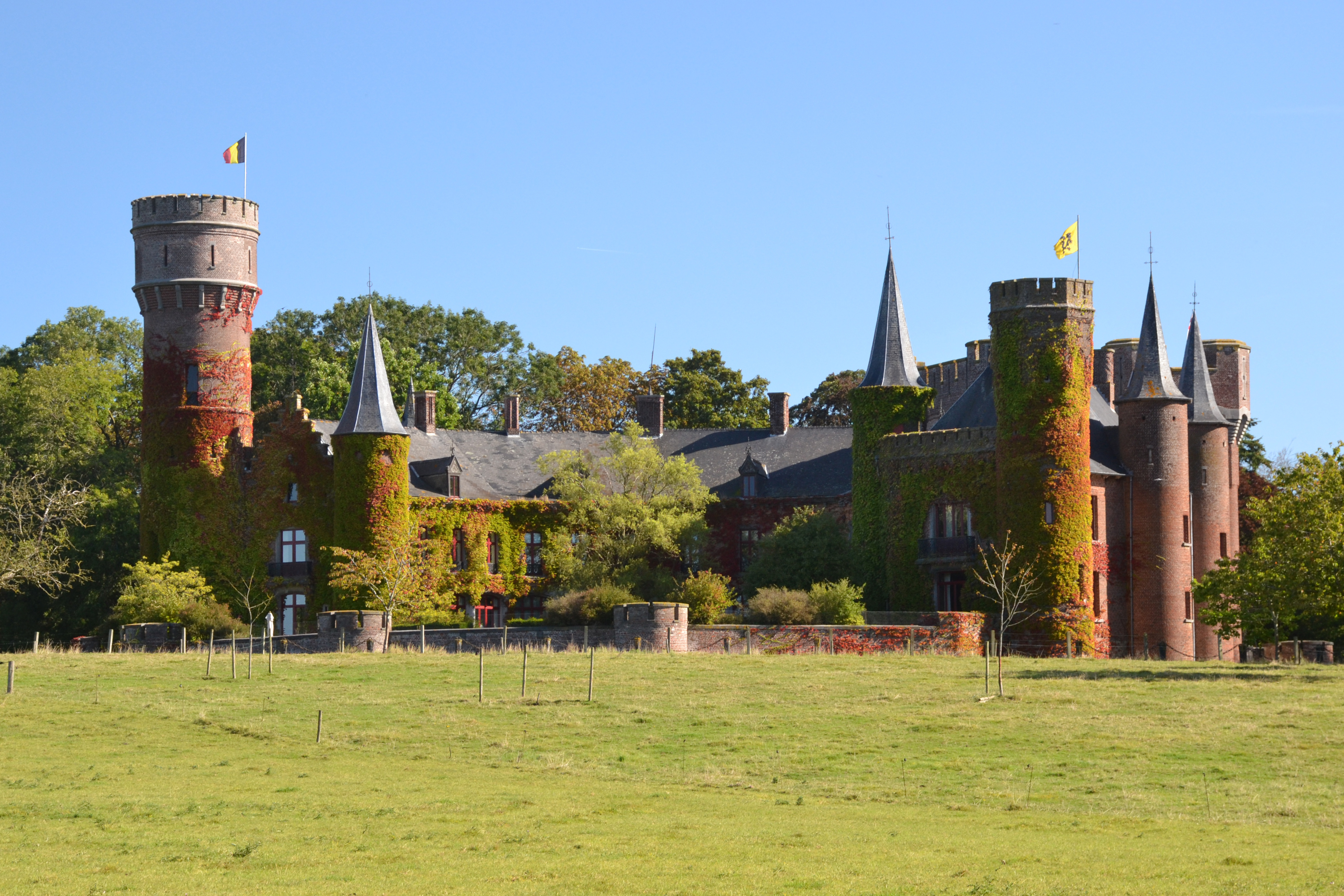
Kasteel van Wijnendale (Wijnendale Castle)

- Beersel Castle
- Bossenstein Castle
- Château de Corroy-le-Château
- Cleydael Castle
- Cortewalle Castle
- Crupet Castle
- Gravensteen
- Havré Castle
- Kasteel van Horst
- La Royère Castle
- Ooidonk Castle
- Solre-sur-Sambre Castle
- Wijnendale Castle

=== Czech Republic ===
- Blatná Castle
- Červená Lhota Castle
- Švihov Castle

=== Denmark ===
- Egeskov Castle
- Spøttrup Castle

=== Finland ===
- Kajaani Castle
- Olavinlinna

=== France ===
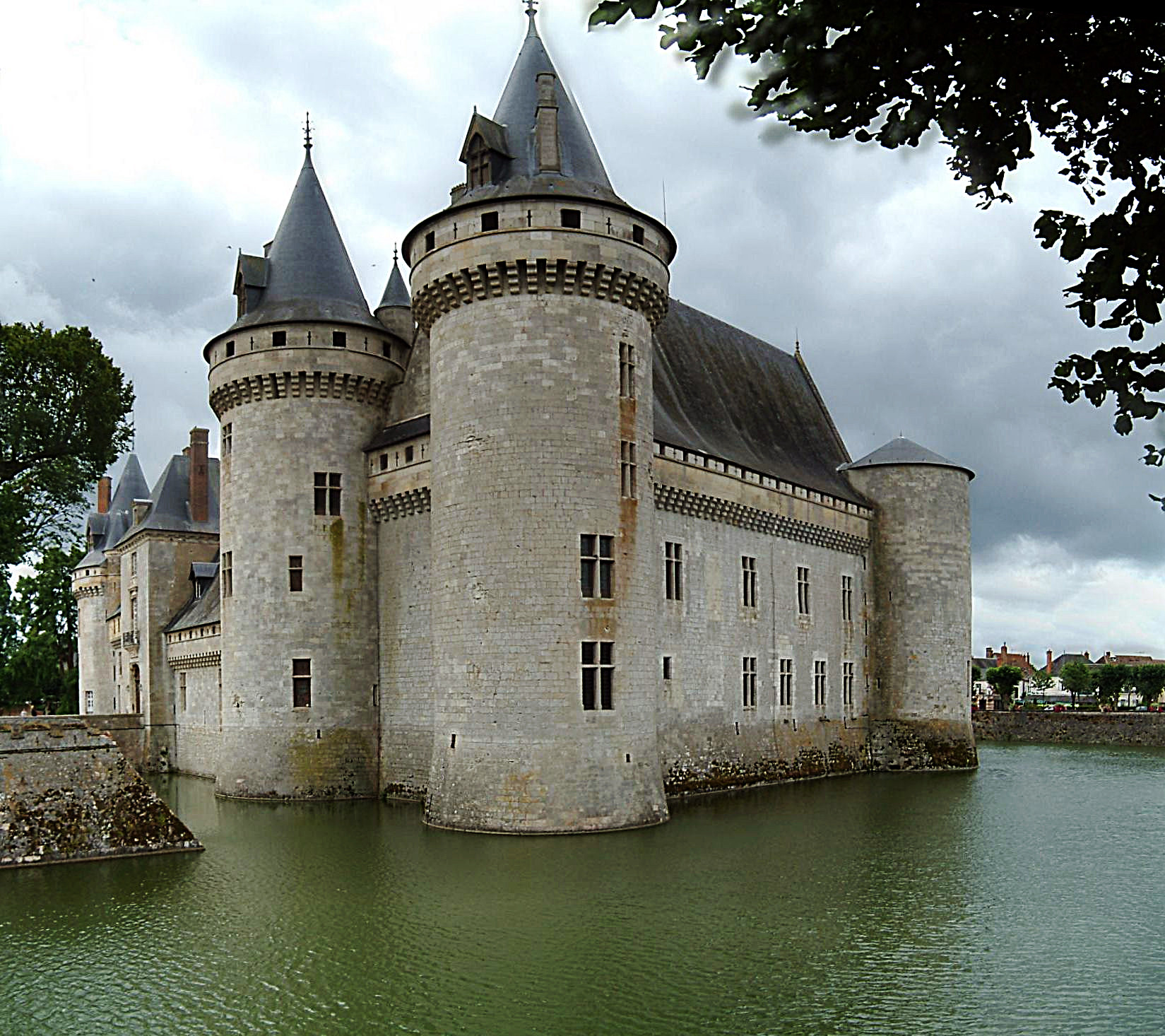
Château de Sully-sur-Loire

Please notice that in French "château d'eau", literally 'water castle', means water tower.

- Château d'Ainay-le-Vieil
- Château de la Mothe-Chandeniers
- Château de Pirou
- Château du Plessis-Bourré
- Château de Trécesson
- Château de Suscinio
- Château de Sully
- Château de Sully-sur-Loire

=== Germany ===
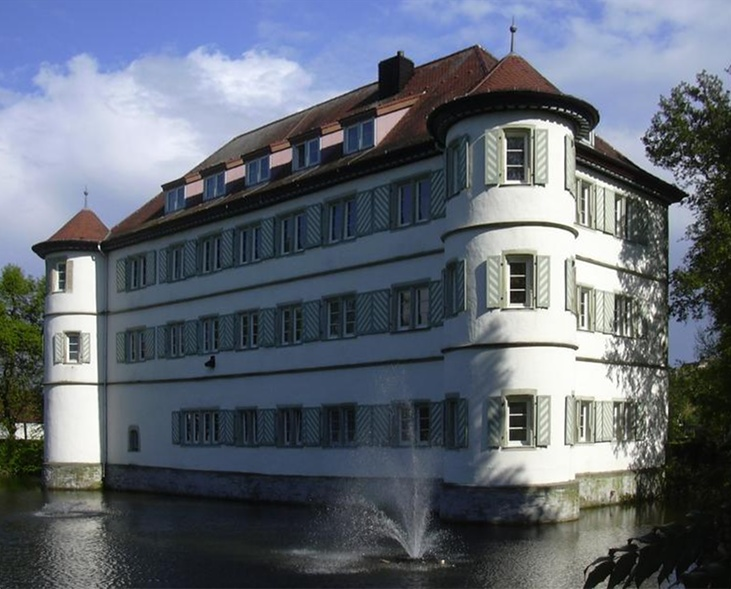
Bad Rappenau

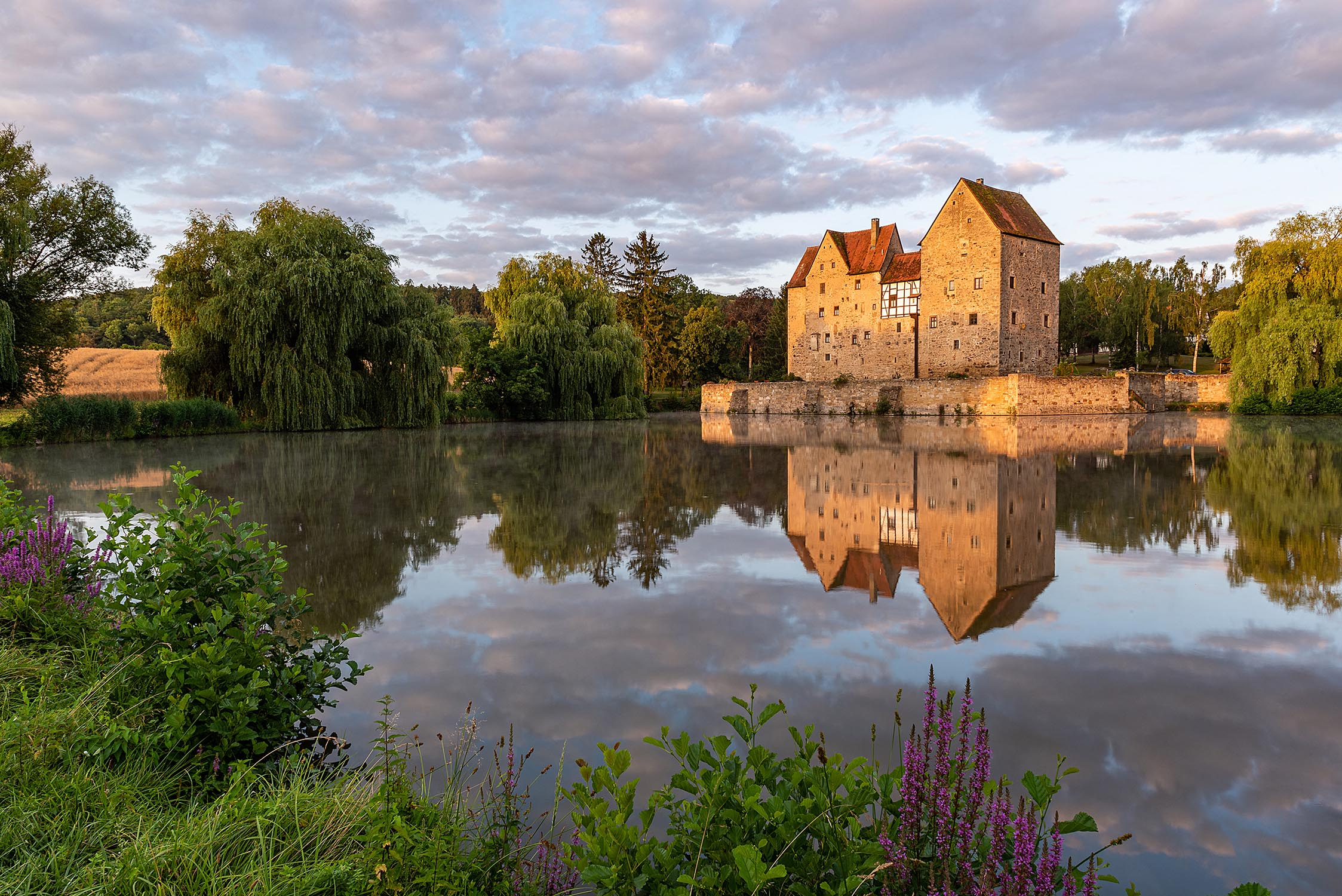
Brennhausen

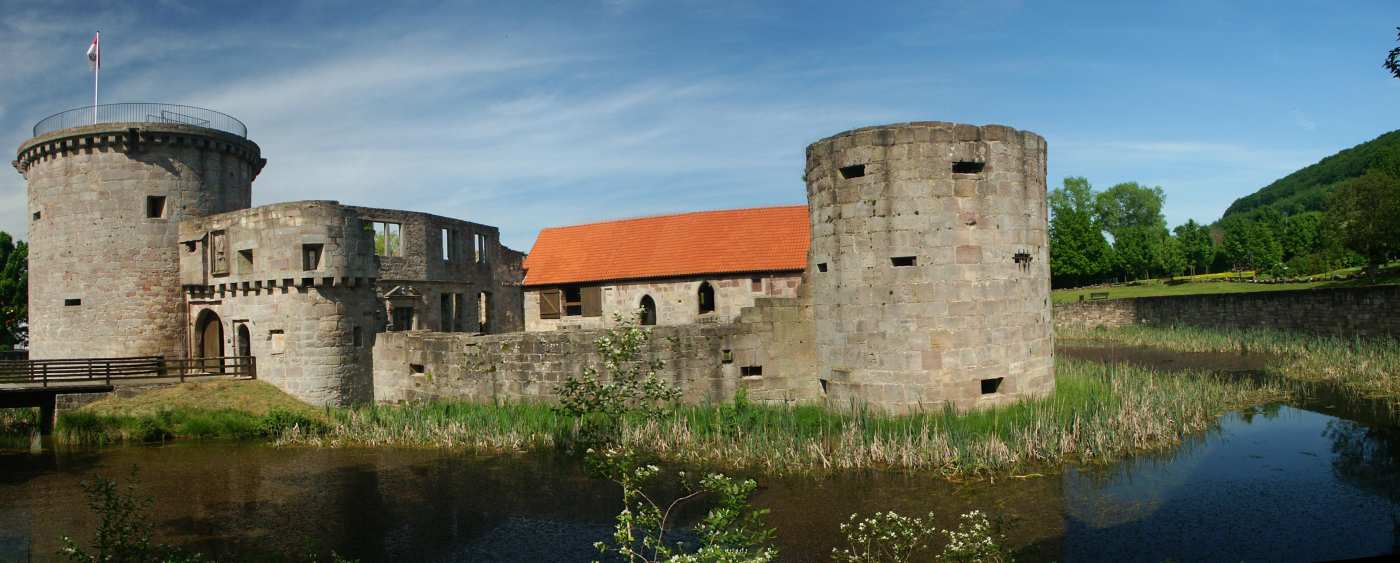
Friedewald water castle

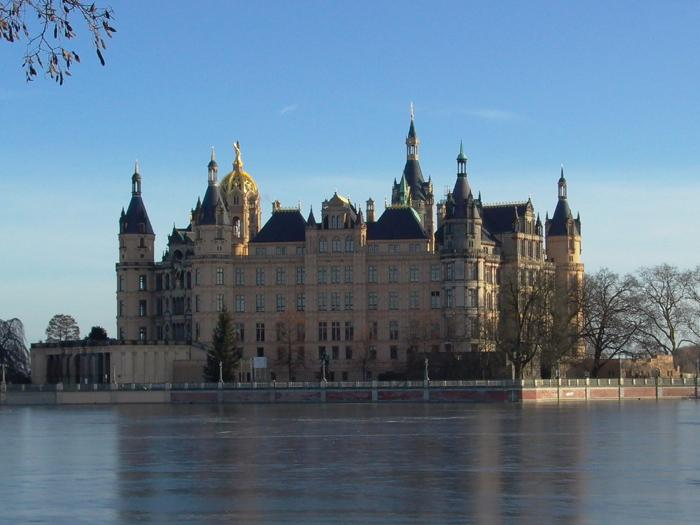
Schwerin Castle

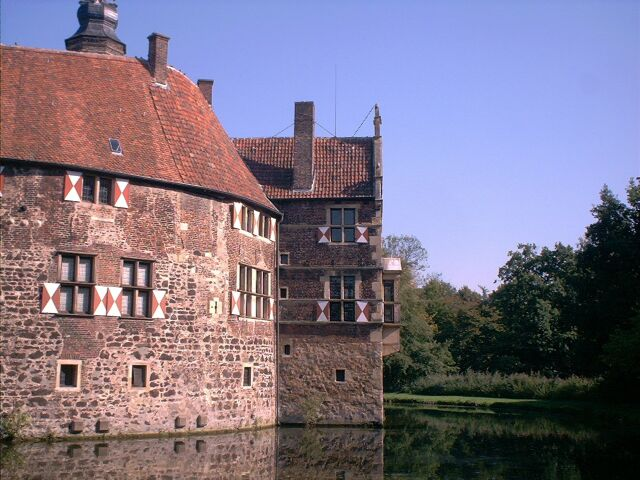
Vischering Castle

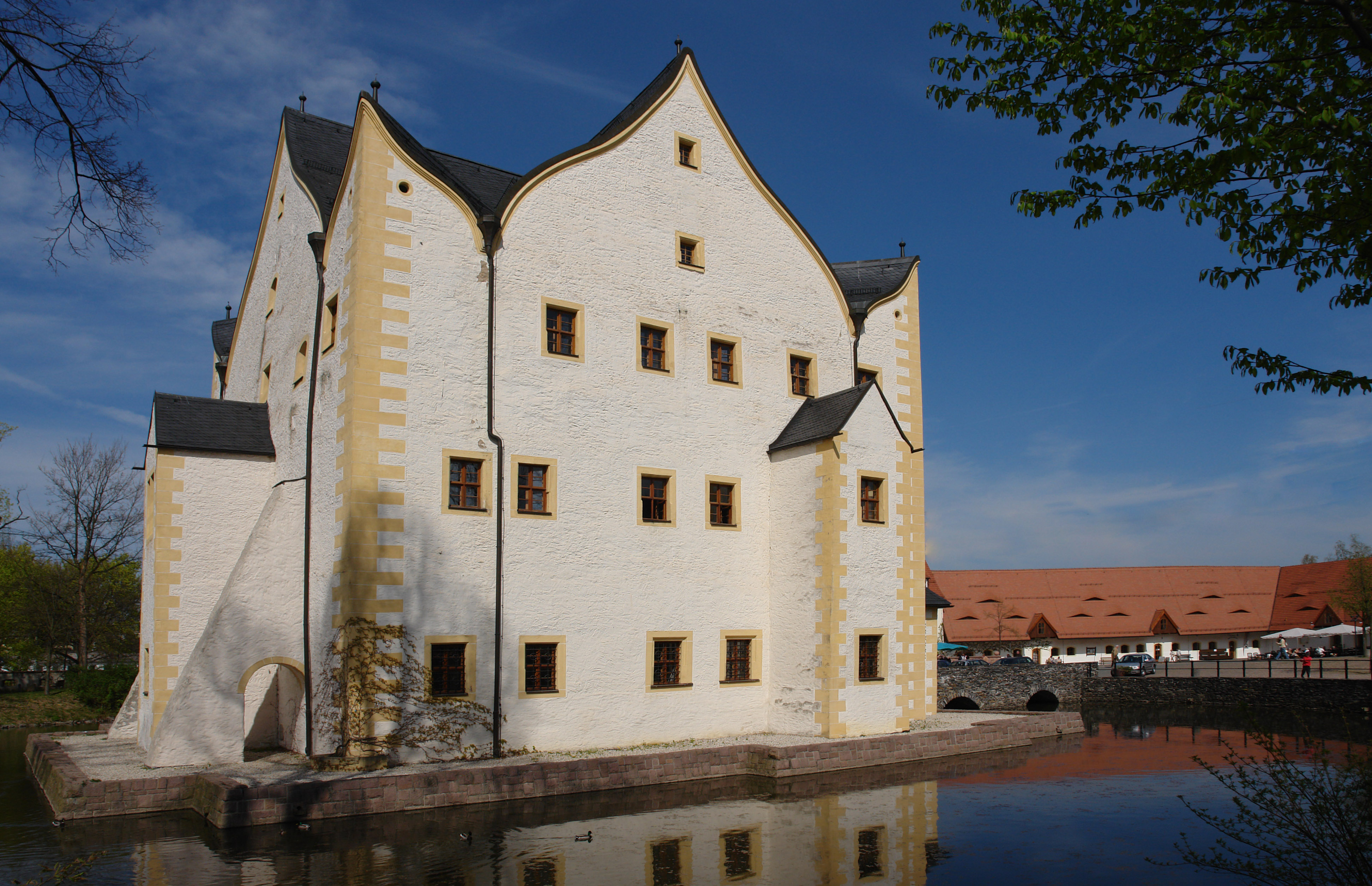
Klaffenbach Castle, (16th century, Saxony)

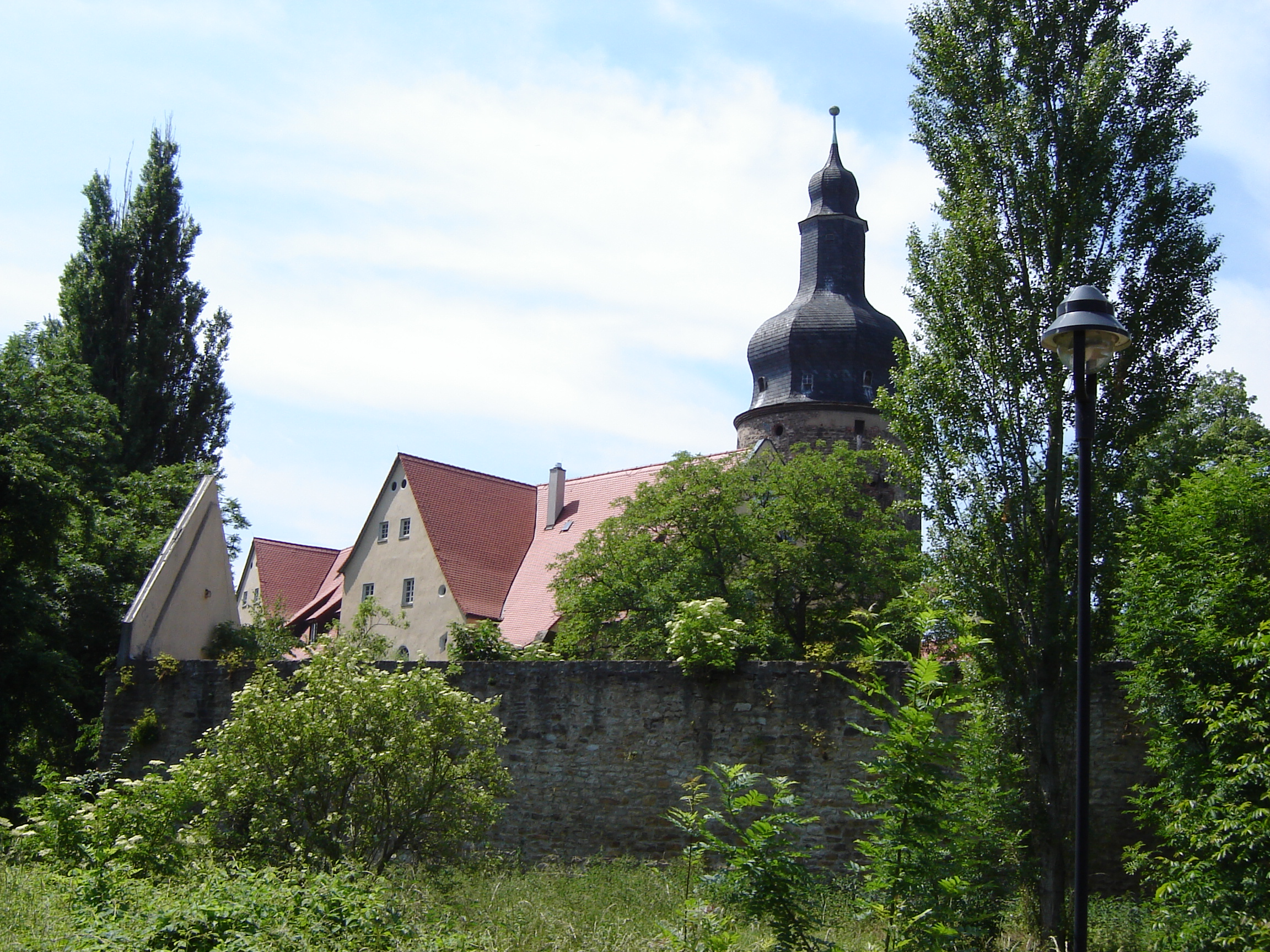
Gommern Water Castle

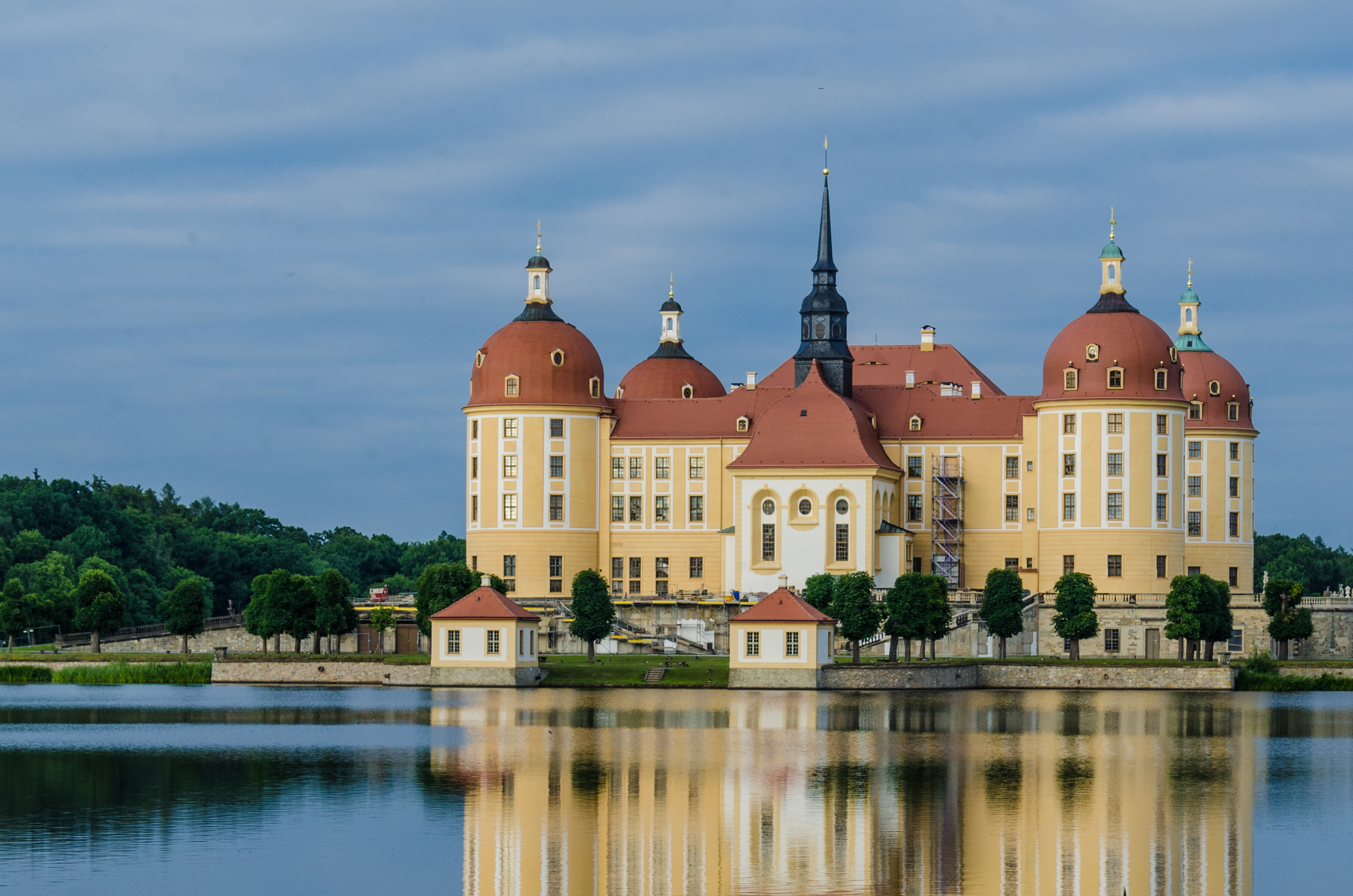
Moritzburg Castle

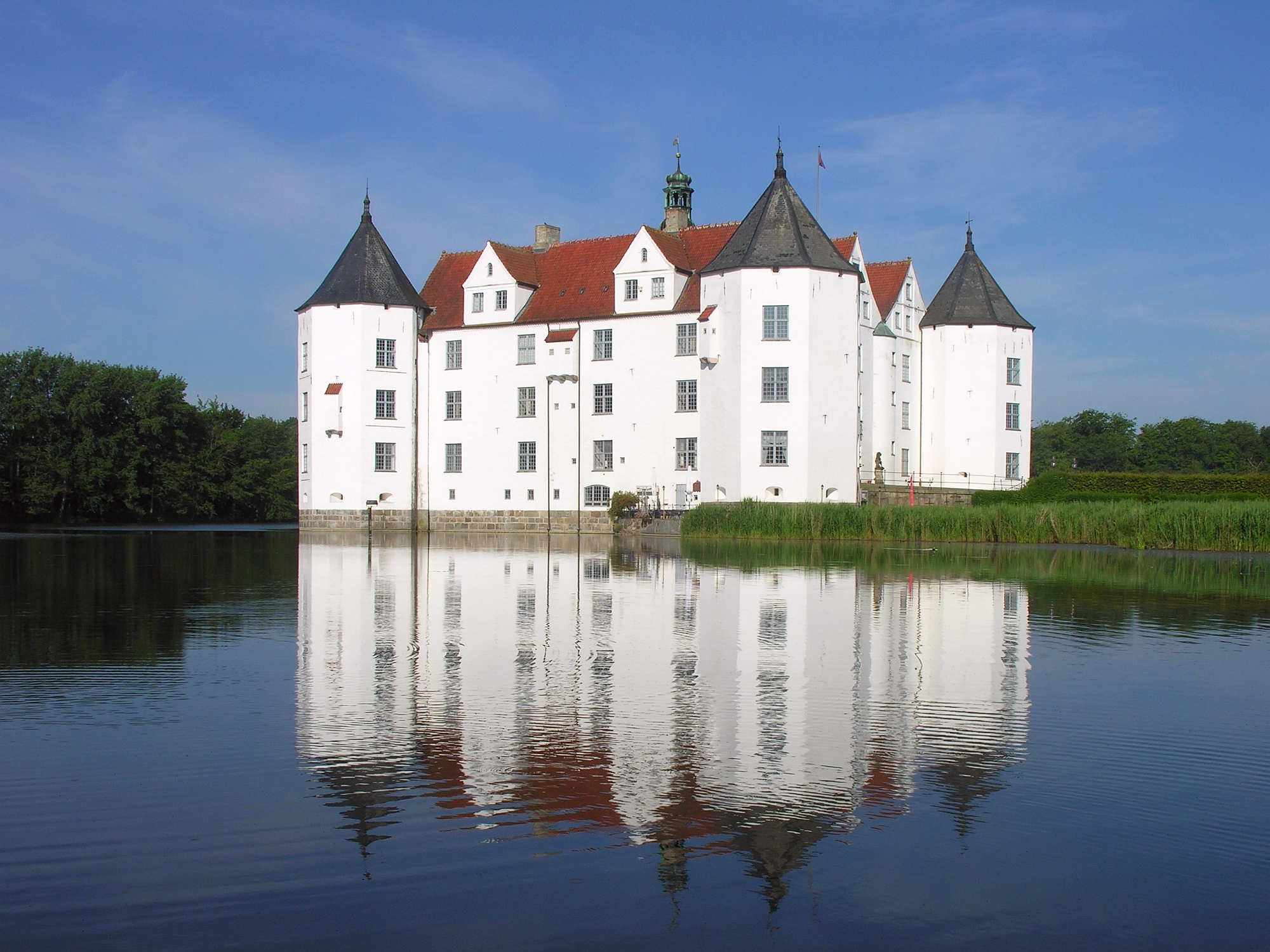
Glücksburg Castle

==== Baden-Württemberg ====
- Bad Rappenau Water Castle
- Inzlingen Castle

==== Bavaria ====
- Brennhausen
- Irmelshausen
- Kleinbardorf
- Mespelbrunn Castle
- Schloss Reichersbeuern

==== Berlin ====
- Köpenick Palace
- Spandau Citadel

==== Brandenburg ====
- Plattenburg in the Prignitz

==== Bremen ====
- Blomendal Castle
- Schönebeck Palace

==== Hamburg ====
- Bergedorf Palace

==== Hesse ====
- Friedewald Water Castle in Friedewald
- Fürstenau Palace near Steinbach

==== Lower Saxony ====
- Celle Castle
- Fallersleben Castle
- Hülsede Water Castle
- Lütetsburg
- Osterburg
- Schelenburg
- Wendhausen Castle
- Wolfsburg Castle

==== Mecklenburg-Vorpommern ====
- Schwerin Castle

==== North Rhine-Westphalia ====
- Benrath House in Düsseldorf
- Burgau Castle
- Darfeld Castle
- Gimborn Castle
- Haus Kemnade in Bochum
- Morsbroich Castle in Leverkusen
- Moyland Castle in Bedburg-Hau
- Nordkirchen Palace
- Rheydt Palace
- Schloss Dyck
- Vischering Castle
- Wilkinghege Water Castle in Münster
- Wittringen Castle in Gladbeck
- Lembeck Castle

==== Rhineland-Palatinate ====
- Alte Burg (Boppard)
- Alte Burg (Koblenz)

==== Saarland ====
- Gustavsburg in Homburg
- Kerpen Castle near Illingen

==== Saxony ====
- Moritzburg Castle
- Hainewalde Water Castle

==== Saxony-Anhalt ====
- Calvörde Castle
- Köthen Castle
- Reinharz Water Castle
- Flechtingen water castle

==== Schleswig-Holstein ====
- Eutin Castle
- Glücksburg Castle

==== Thuringia ====
- Kapellendorf Water Castle

=== Greece ===
- Bourtzi
- Methoni Castle

=== Hungary ===
- Sárvár Castle
- Tokaj Castle (ruined)

=== Indonesia ===
- Taman Sari Water Castle

=== Italy ===
- Castello Estense
- Castello di Sirmione
- in a broad way, Venice Arsenal

=== Japan ===
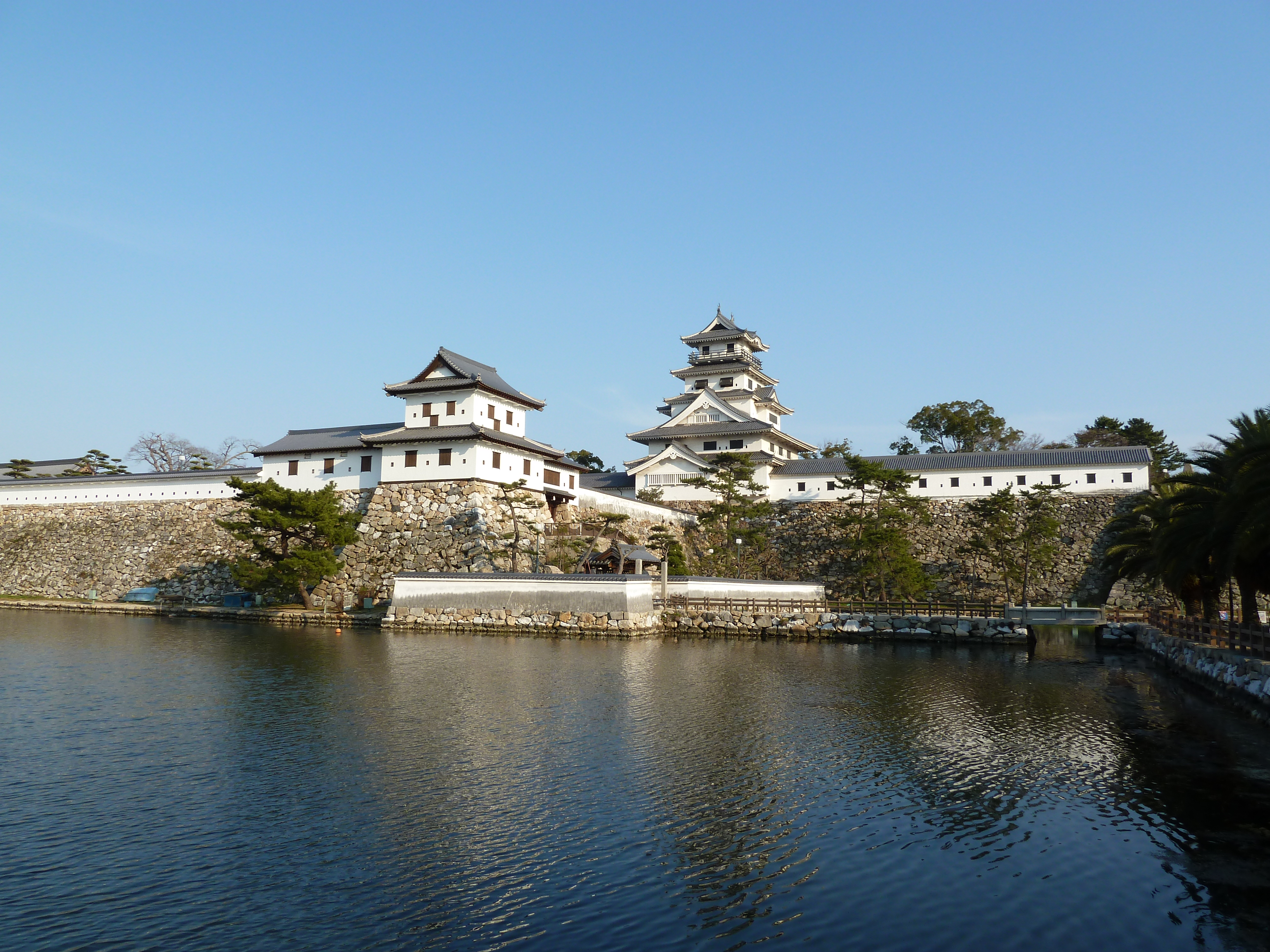
Imabari Castle

- Imabari Castle
- Nakatsu Castle
- Takamatsu Castle

=== Lebanon ===
- Sidon Sea Castle

=== Netherlands ===
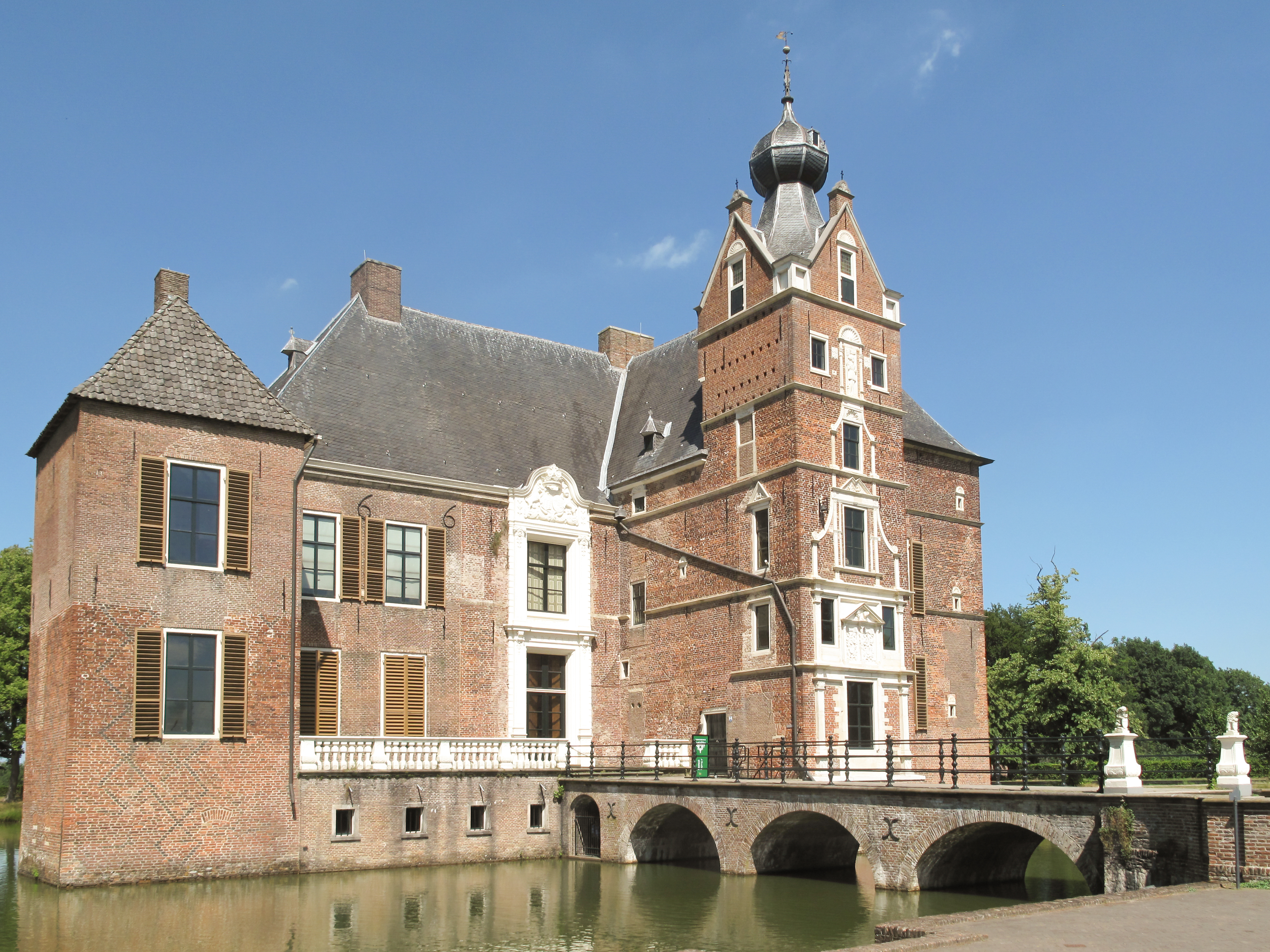
Cannenburgh Castle

- Cannenburgh Castle
- Hoensbroek Castle
- Muiderslot
- Loevestein
- Ammersoyen Castle
- Kasteel Radboud
- Brederode Castle

=== Poland ===
- Lidzbark Castle
- Oporów Castle
- Szydłowiec Castle

=== Portugal ===
- Belém Tower

=== Slovakia ===
- Parič Castle (ruined)
- Šintava Castle (ruined)
- Štítnik Water Castle
- Vranov Castle (vanished)

=== Slovenia ===
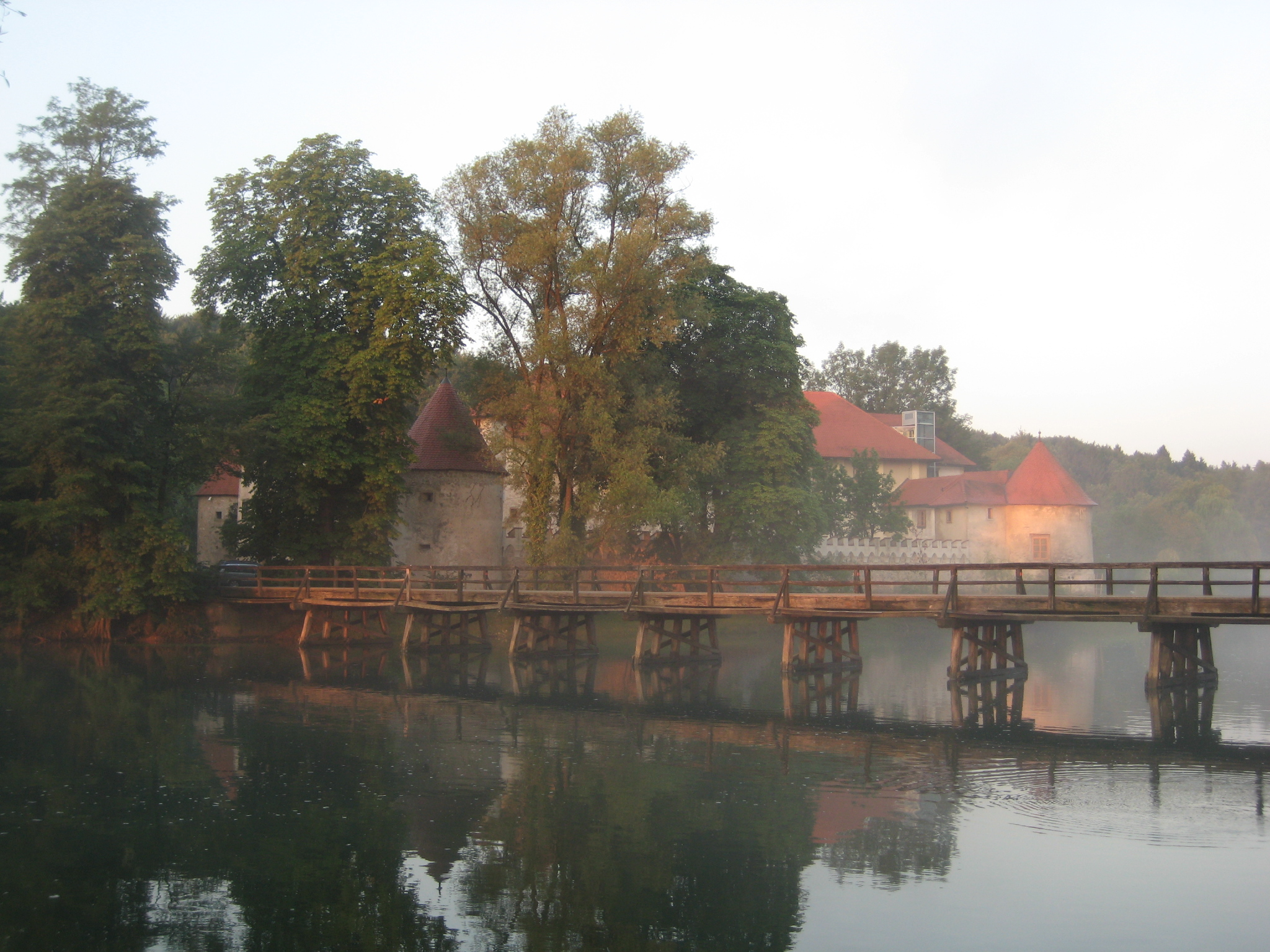
Otočec Castle

- Otočec Castle

=== Sweden ===
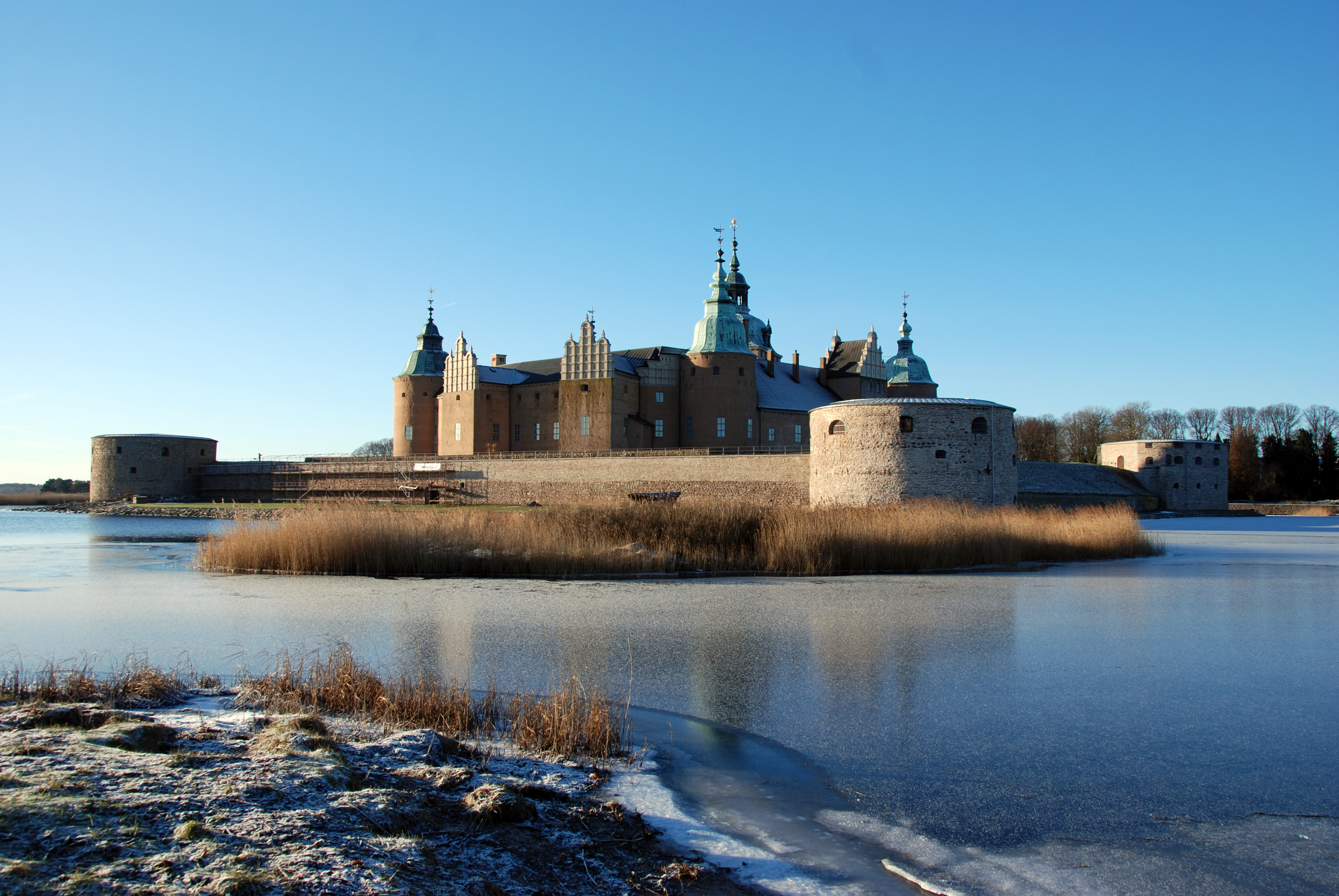
Kalmar Castle

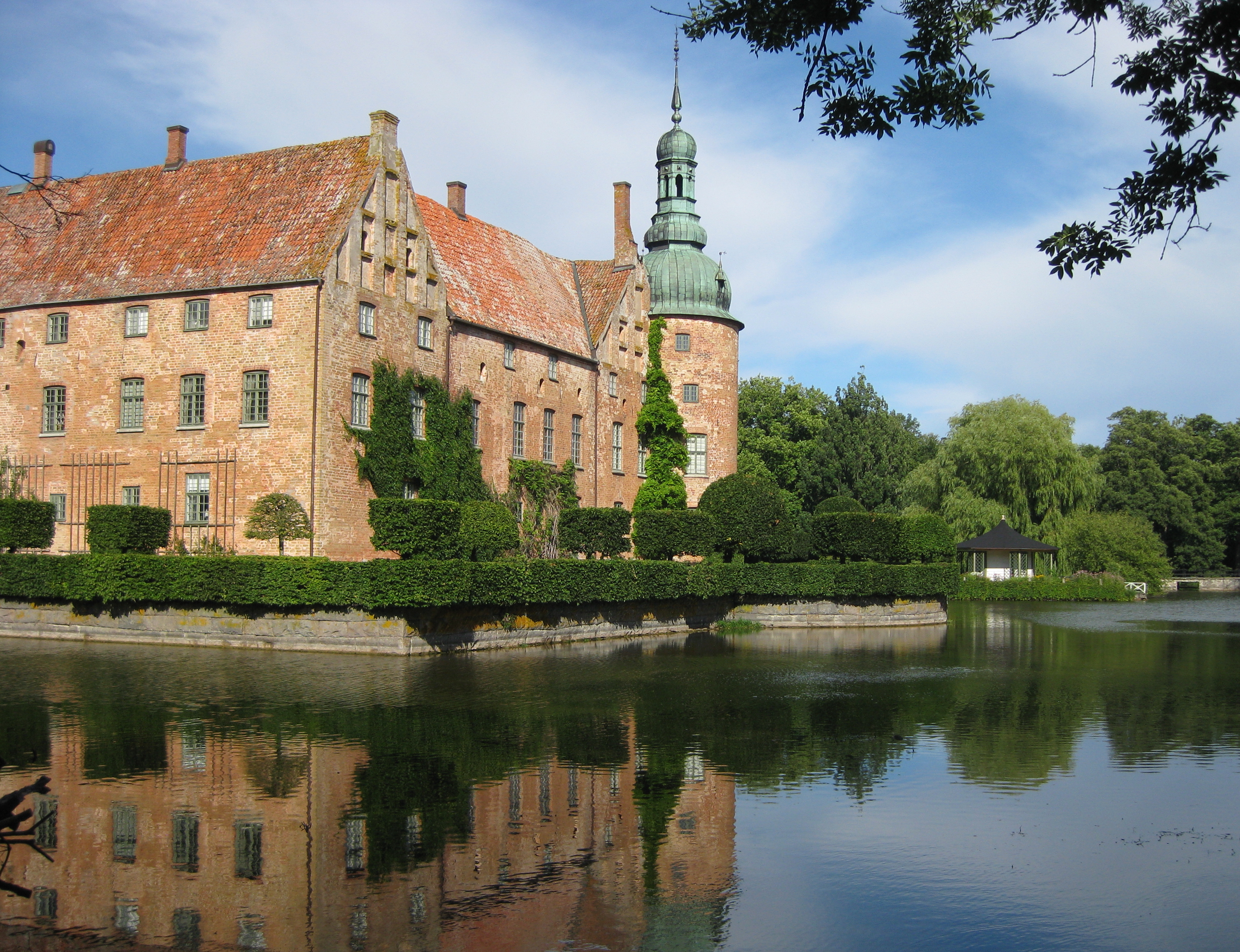
Vittskövle Castle

- Älvsborg Fortress
- Bollerup
- Dybäck Castle
- Ellinge Castle
- Gåsevadholm Castle
- Gripsholm Castle
- Häckeberga Castle
- Hjularyd Castle
- Kalmar Castle
- Krageholm Castle
- Krapperup Castle
- Kronoberg Castle
- Kulla Gunnarstorp Castle
- Landskrona Citadel
- Malmö Castle
- Maltesholm Castle
- Örebro Castle
- Örup Castle
- Osbyholm Castle
- Skabersjö Castle
- Stegeborg Castle
- Strömsholm Palace
- Tosterup Castle
- Trolle-Ljungby Castle
- Trolleholm Castle
- Vadstena Castle
- Vaxholm Fortress
- Vegeholm Castle
- Vibyholm Castle
- Viderup Castle
- Vittskövle Castle

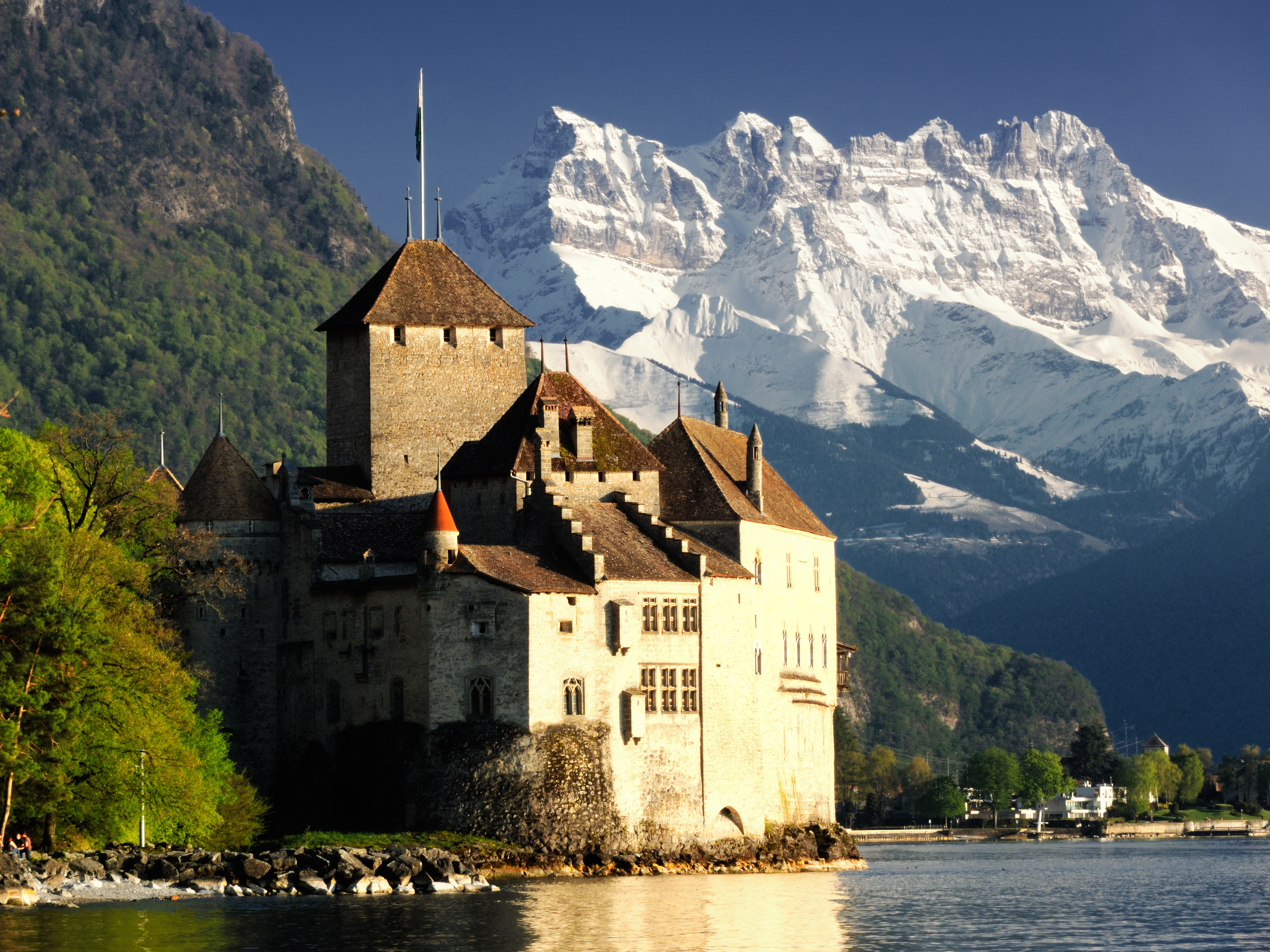
Chillon Castle

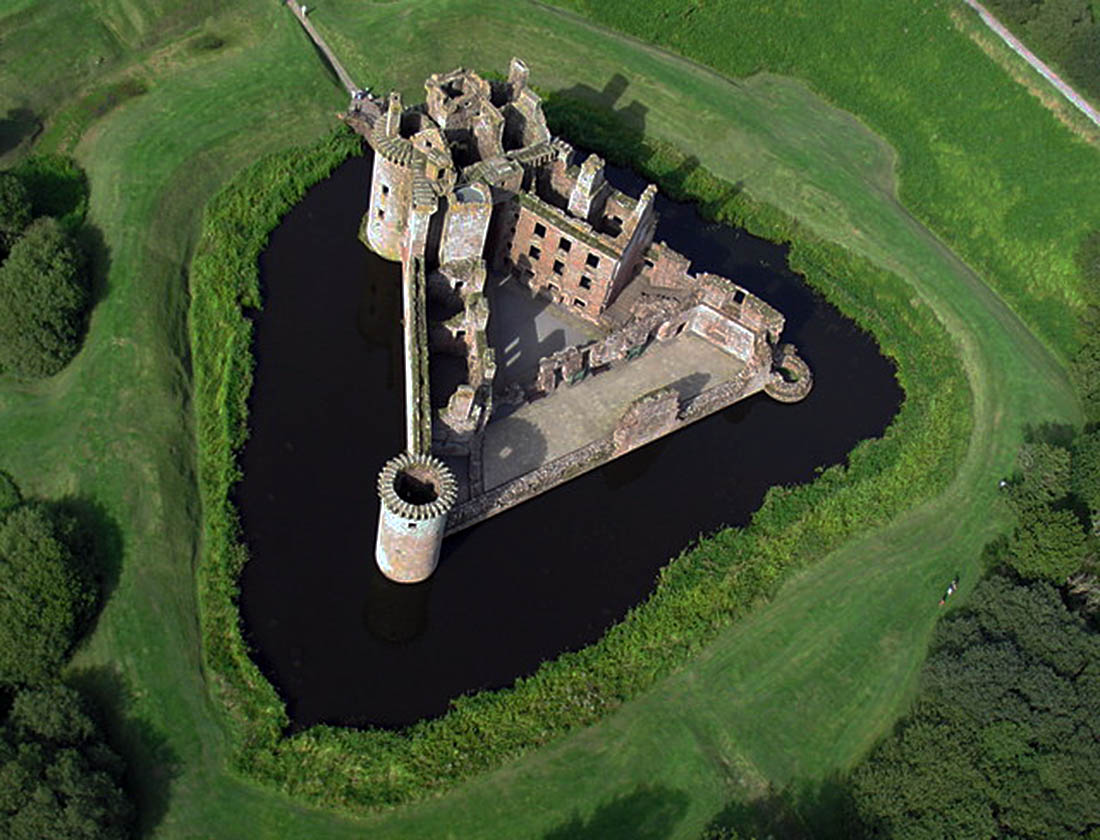
Caerlaverock Castle

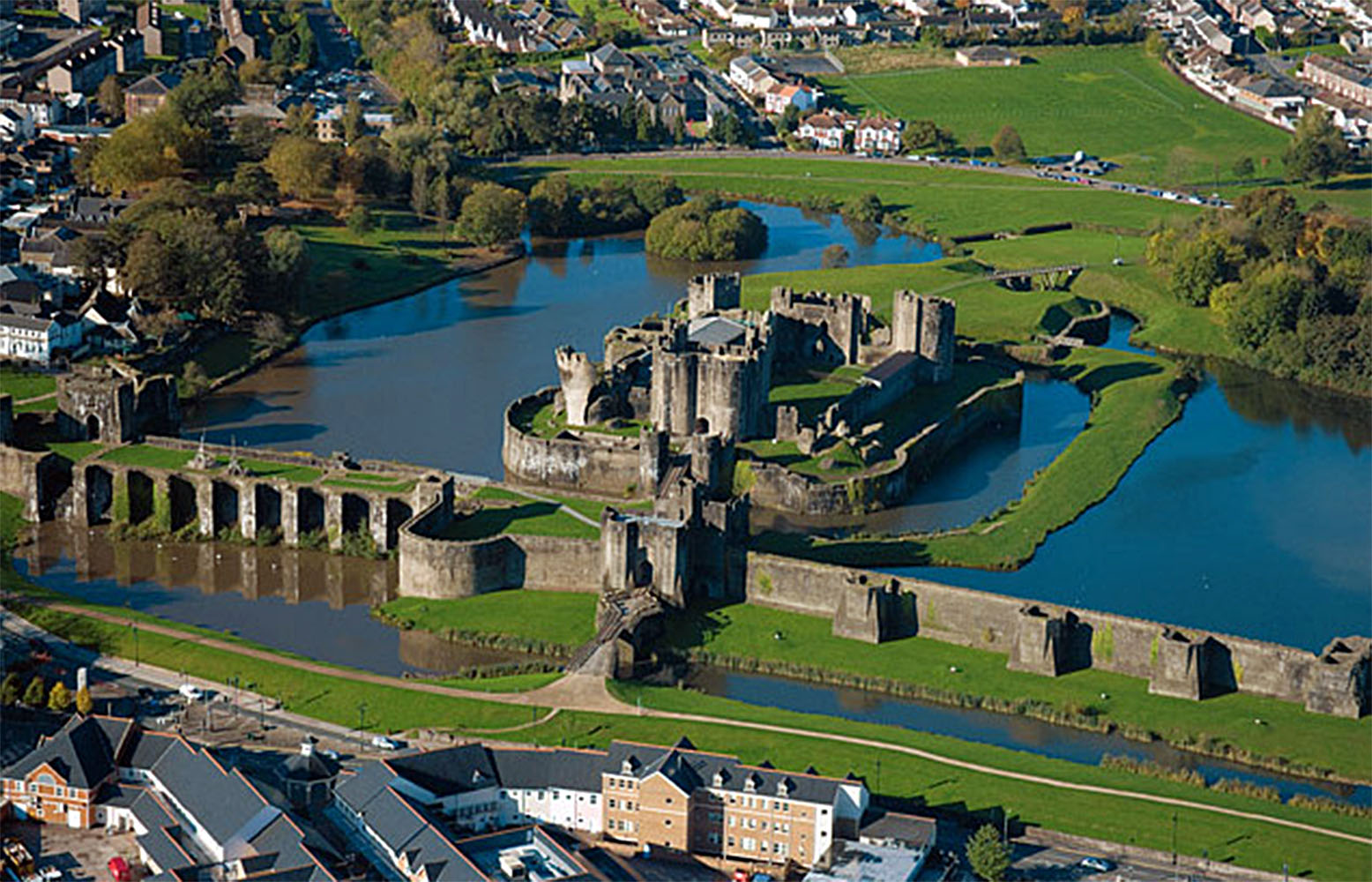
Caerphilly Castle

=== Romania ===
- Făgăraş Castle
- Oradea fortress

=== Switzerland ===
- Bottmingen Castle
- Chillon Castle
- Hagenwil Castle
- Hallwyl Castle
- Wörth Castle
- Wyher Castle

=== Turkey ===
- Kızkalesi (castle), formerly Gramvoussa (Greek) and Gorygos (Armenian)

=== United Kingdom ===
==== England ====
- Bodiam Castle
- Caister Castle
- Framlingham Castle
- Herstmonceux Castle
- Kenilworth Castle (moat drained)
- Leeds Castle

==== Scotland ====
- Caerlaverock Castle
- Castle Stalker
- Eilean Donan

==== Wales ====
- Caerphilly Castle
- Beaumaris Castle
