= Otočec =

Otočec Šent Peter (until 1952)
- Interactive map of Otočec
- Location in Slovenia
- Coordinates: 45°50′9.68″N 15°13′5.92″E
- Country: Slovenia
- Traditional region: Lower Carniola
- Statistical region: Southeast Slovenia
- Municipality: Novo Mesto

Area
  - Total: 2.627 km^{2} (1.014 sq mi)
- Elevation: 194.3 m (637 ft)

Population (2026)
  - Total: 865
  - Density: 329/km^{2} (850/sq mi)
- Postal code: 8222

Otočec (pronounced [ɔˈtoːtʃəts], German: Sankt Peter) is a settlement on the left bank of the Krka River in the City Municipality of Novo Mesto in southeastern Slovenia. The area is part of the traditional region of Lower Carniola and is now included in the Southeast Slovenia Statistical Region. In January 2026, the population was 865.

== Name ==
The name of the settlement was changed from Šent Peter (literally, 'Saint Peter') to Otočec (literally, 'small island') in 1952. The name was changed on the basis of the 1948 Law on Names of Settlements and Designations of Squares, Streets, and Buildings as part of efforts by Slovenia's postwar communist government to remove religious elements from toponyms.

== Church ==
The local parish church is dedicated to Saint Peter and belongs to the Roman Catholic Diocese of Novo Mesto. It was first mentioned in written documents dating to 1406. It was rebuilt in the 17th and 19th centuries.

== Roads ==
Otočec can be reached by taking the A2 Motorway from Novo Mesto, which is part of Pan-European Corridor X.

== Otočec Castle ==
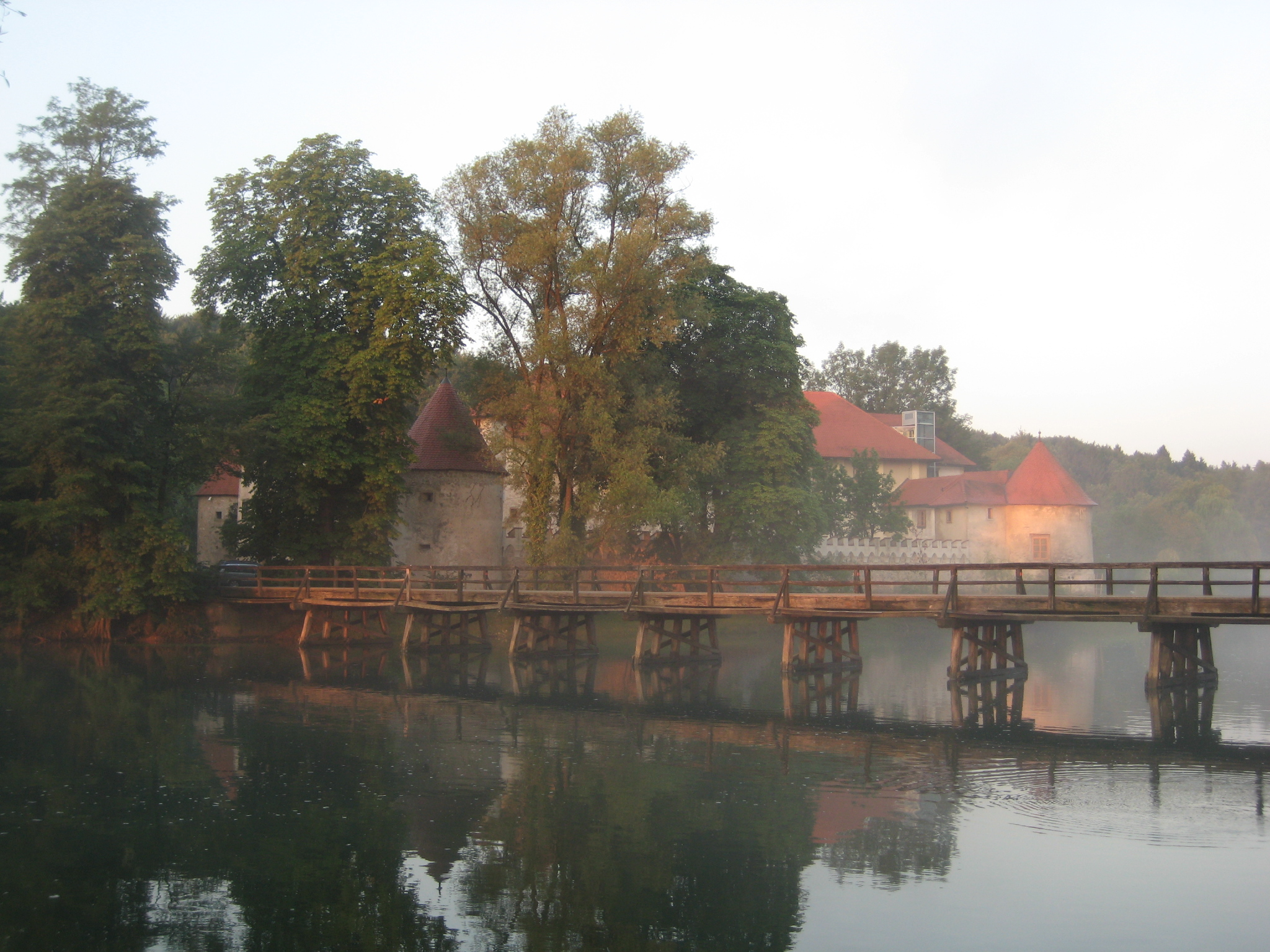
Otočec Castle, Slovenia's only water castle.

Otočec Castle was first mentioned in documents in the 13th century, and the walls are said to date to 1252. The castle is built on a small island in the middle of the Krka River east of the main settlement of Otočec. Of the 30 small islets in the Krka River in this area, the castle is on the largest island, which was formed by cutting a southern channel around the castle in order to form a moat around it.

The islet is linked to both banks of the river by two wooden bridges (a northern bridge and a southern bridge) so that it is possible to drive from either the north side or the south side, straight through the islet, to the opposite side of the river. There is parking at the entrance of the northern bridge and on the islet itself, but there is no parking at the entrance to the southern bridge.

This castle is the only water castle in Slovenia, and it has now been converted into a small luxury hotel. It is also a member of Relais & Châteaux, which is a global fellowship of individually owned and operated luxury hotels and restaurants. Bradt Travel Guides calls it "one of the most famous hotels in Slovenia." The castle also has a world–class restaurant on–site.

There is also a boat house (located on the southern channel behind the castle), a golf course, a castle park, and an adventure park with a ropes course on the island where Otočec Castle stands.
