= Benestad Church =

- Benestads kyrka
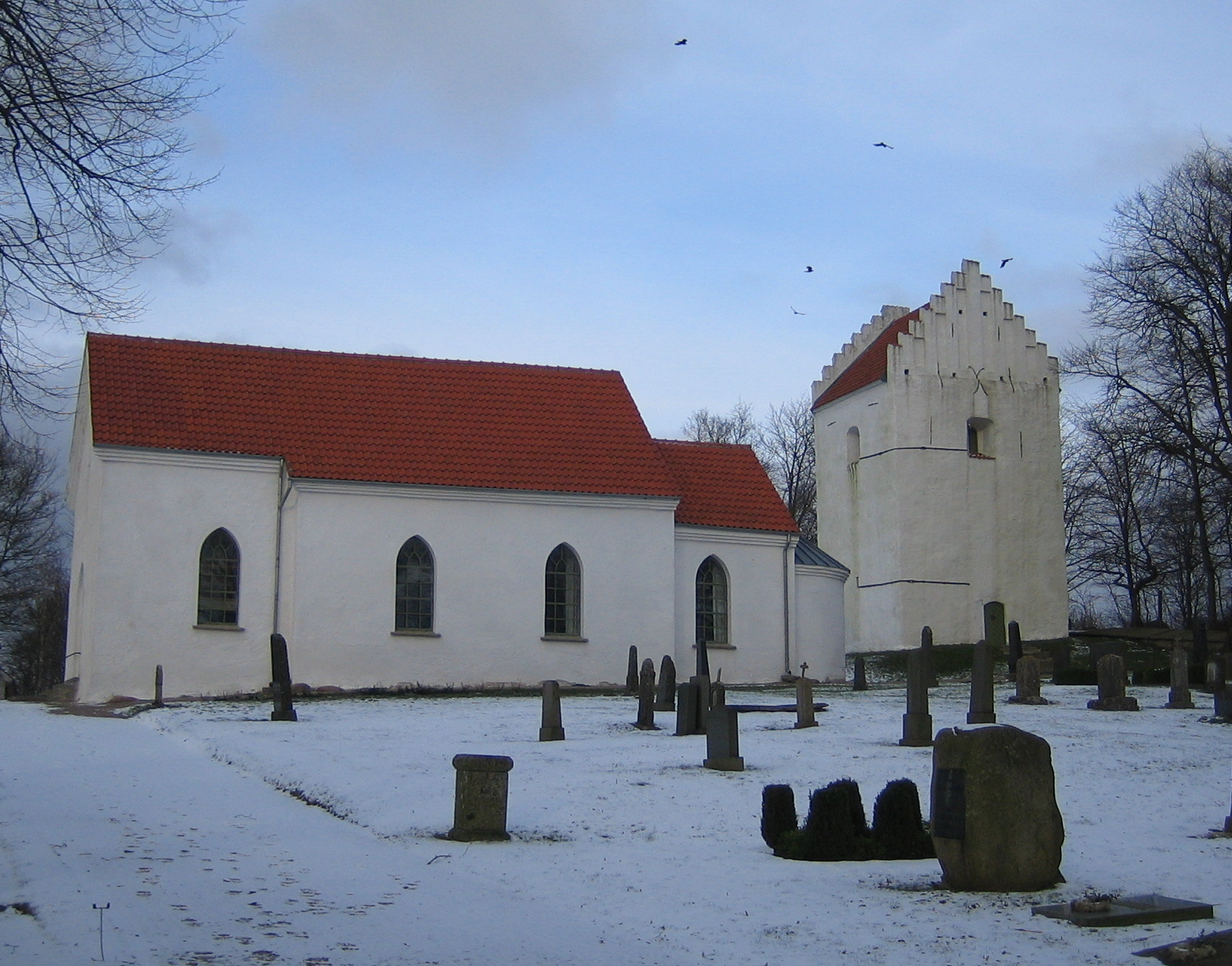
- Benestad Church

- Location within Skåne Location within Sweden
- 55°31′27″N 13°54′23″E
- Country: Sweden
- Denomination: Church of Sweden

Benestad Church (Swedish: Benestads kyrka) is a medieval church in Benestad, Scania, Sweden. It belongs to the Church of Sweden. Next to the church stands a defensive tower erected in the 15th century. The church itself contains medieval murals from three different periods.

== History ==
Benestad Church was built at the end of the 12th century, and originally only consisted of the present-day nave. The apse is an addition from the 13th century, and a tower was added in the 14th century. Inside, vaults were built in the 13th century in the chancel and in the nave during the 14th century. An external defensive tower (kastal) was built during the 15th century north east of the church itself. During the early 19th century, it was converted into a belfry. In 1859 a more far-reaching renovation of the church was carried out, and at that time the church tower was demolished and its base reconfigured as a new entrance. Further renovations were made in 1873, between 1903 and 1904 and between 1949 and 1954.

== Murals and furnishings ==
The church contains medieval murals from three different periods; the chancel arch retains fragments of Romanesque paintings, while the chancel has paintings dating from the first half of the 14th century, depicting scenes from Genesis and depictions of saints and prophets. The vaults of the nave were decorated around 1500. They also depict scenes from the Old Testament, as well as the Last Judgment and the seven deadly sins.

The pulpit is the oldest of the church's fittings. It dates from 1690 and is richly decorated in a Baroque style. It also carries the coat of arms of Axel Rosencrantz of the Rosenkrantz family, who in 1684 settled in nearby Örup Castle and possibly donated the pulpit. The altarpiece is from 1732 and depicts the Calvary with Mary and Saint John. The baptismal font is from 1904 and designed by architect Theodor Wåhlin, who was responsible for the renovation of the church in 1903–04.
