= Münster-Kinderhaus =

Coordinates: 51°59′45″N 7°36′15″E

Kinderhaus is a district of Münster, a city in North Rhine-Westphalia, Germany. It lies approximately 4 km to the north of the centre of Münster and belongs to the borough Münster-Nord, together with Coerde and Sprakel. It has 16,000 inhabitants and is mainly a residential area, though it has attracted some service enterprises, primarily in a large strip mall surrounding the Bürgerzentrum.

== History ==
Kinderhaus was founded in 1333, at that time far outside the city walls of Münster. The name is derived from a house for lepers with the name "kinderen hus". Until the start of the 19th century, Kinderhaus consisted only of this house, a church and a few farms.

In the year 1903 Kinderhaus became a part of Münster, and since then it has been steadily growing.

During the Cold War period, Kinderhaus was home to a very large number of USA and British Armed Forces Personnel and their families, probably the biggest enclave in Münster at the time.

== Sights ==
- Wasserschloss Wilkinghege built in 1311, now used as hotel and restaurant
- The leprosy museum of Münster
- The Waldschule (forest school) built in 1673, probably the oldest schoolbuilding in Germany that is still in use
