= Vodný Hrad =

Coordinates: 48°39′24″N 20°21′55″E

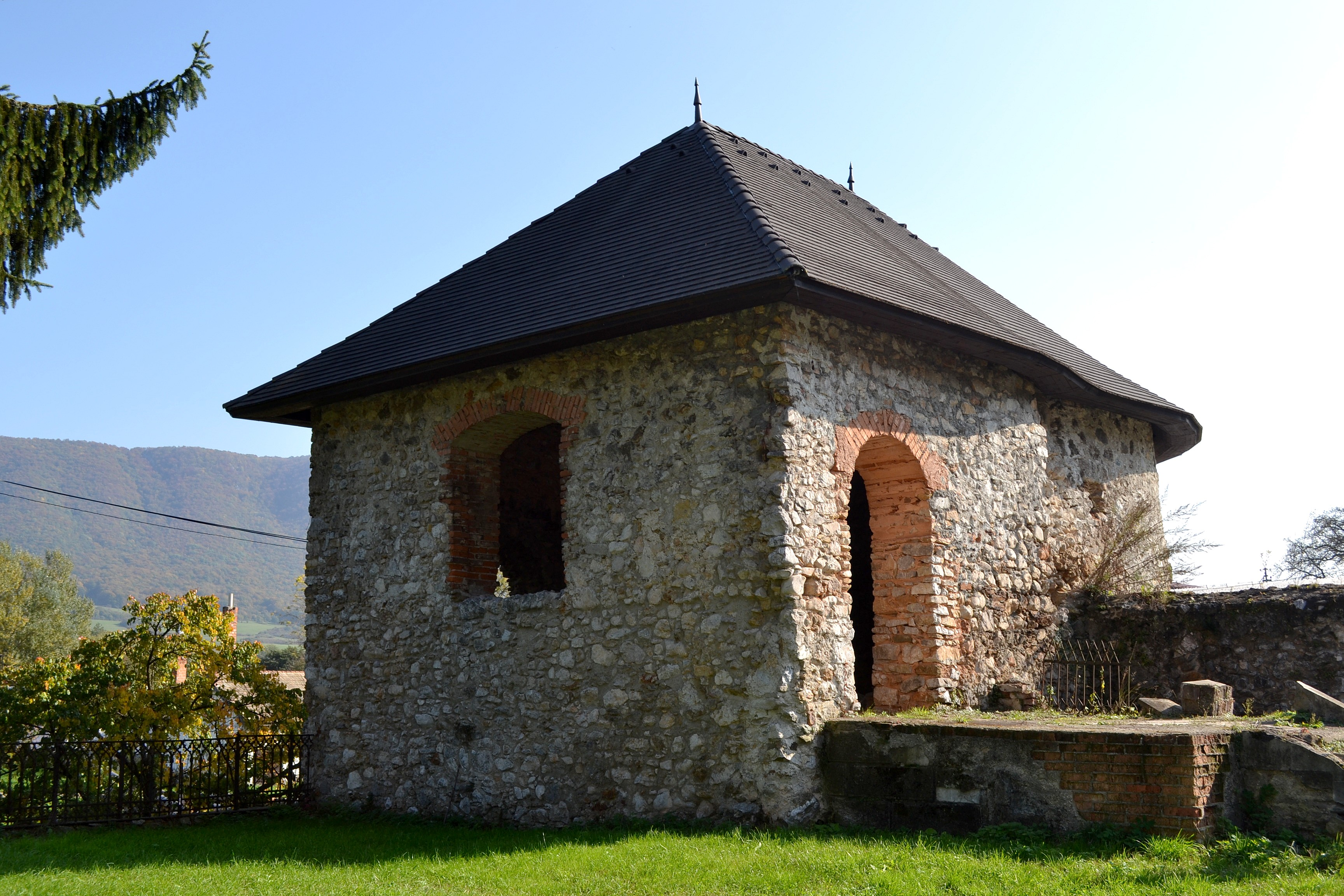
Vodný Hrad

Vodný Hrad is a smaller water castle in Štítnik, Slovakia.

== Location ==
The ruins are located in a park, not far from a local church. Štítnik is about 14 km from Rožňava.

== History ==
The castle was first constructed in the 14th century.

Around 1559, the castle's protective walls surrounding the castle underwent a reconstruction to better ward off enemies from attempting to capture the village or the castle. The castle belonged to several families including the Balog, Pongrác and Bakošov families.

At the beginning of the 19th century, a part of the castle was remodeled into a more period manor house.
