= Otočec Castle =

Coordinates: 45°50′16″N 15°14′5″E

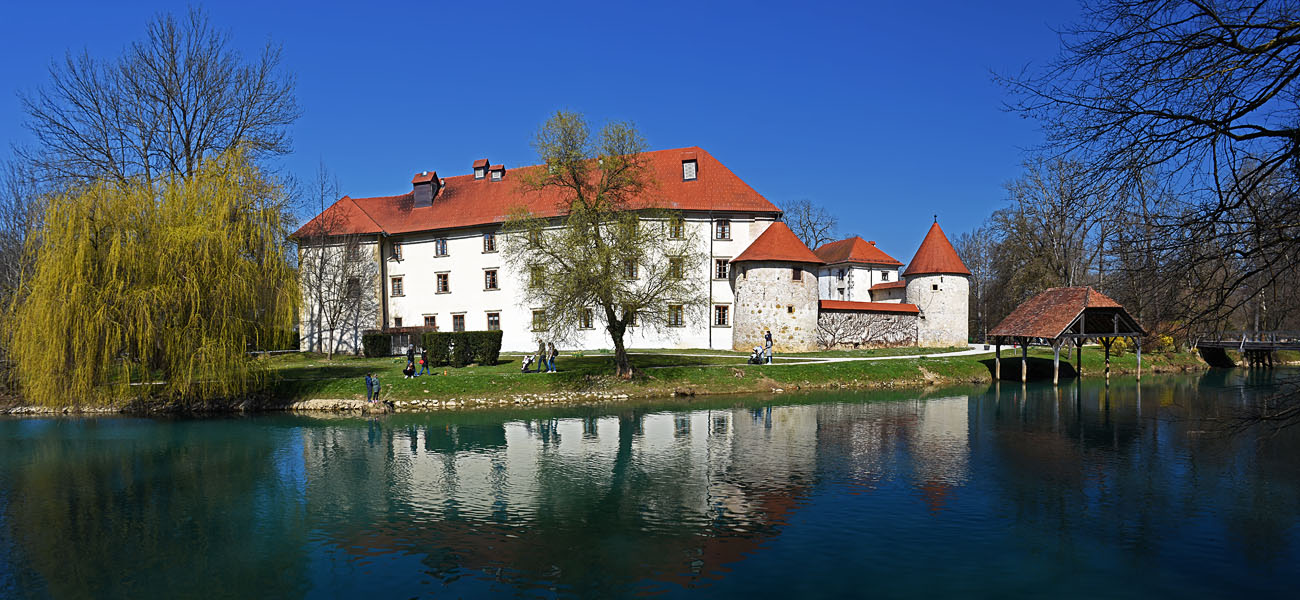
Otočec Castle from the south

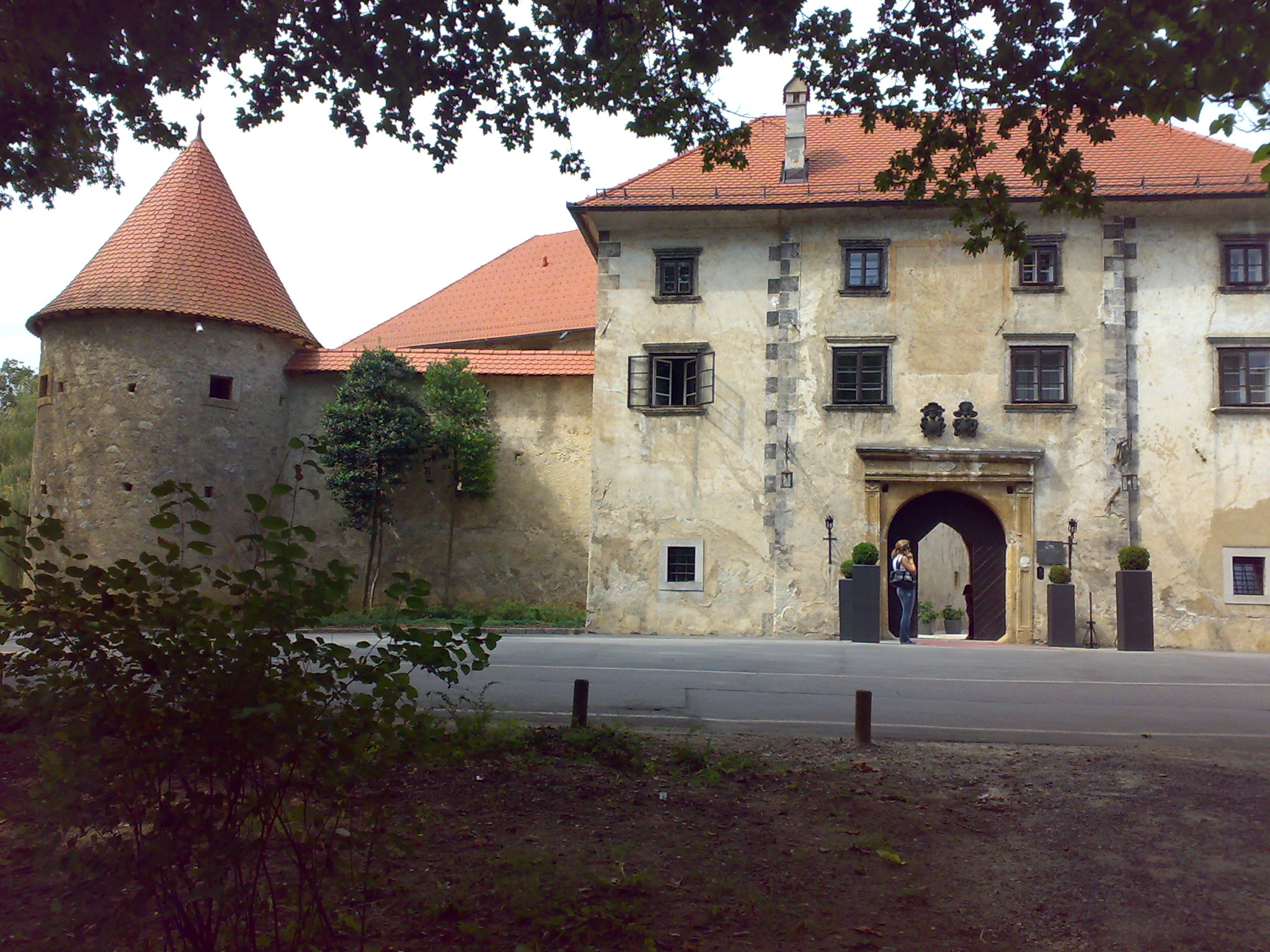
Front gate of Otočec Castle

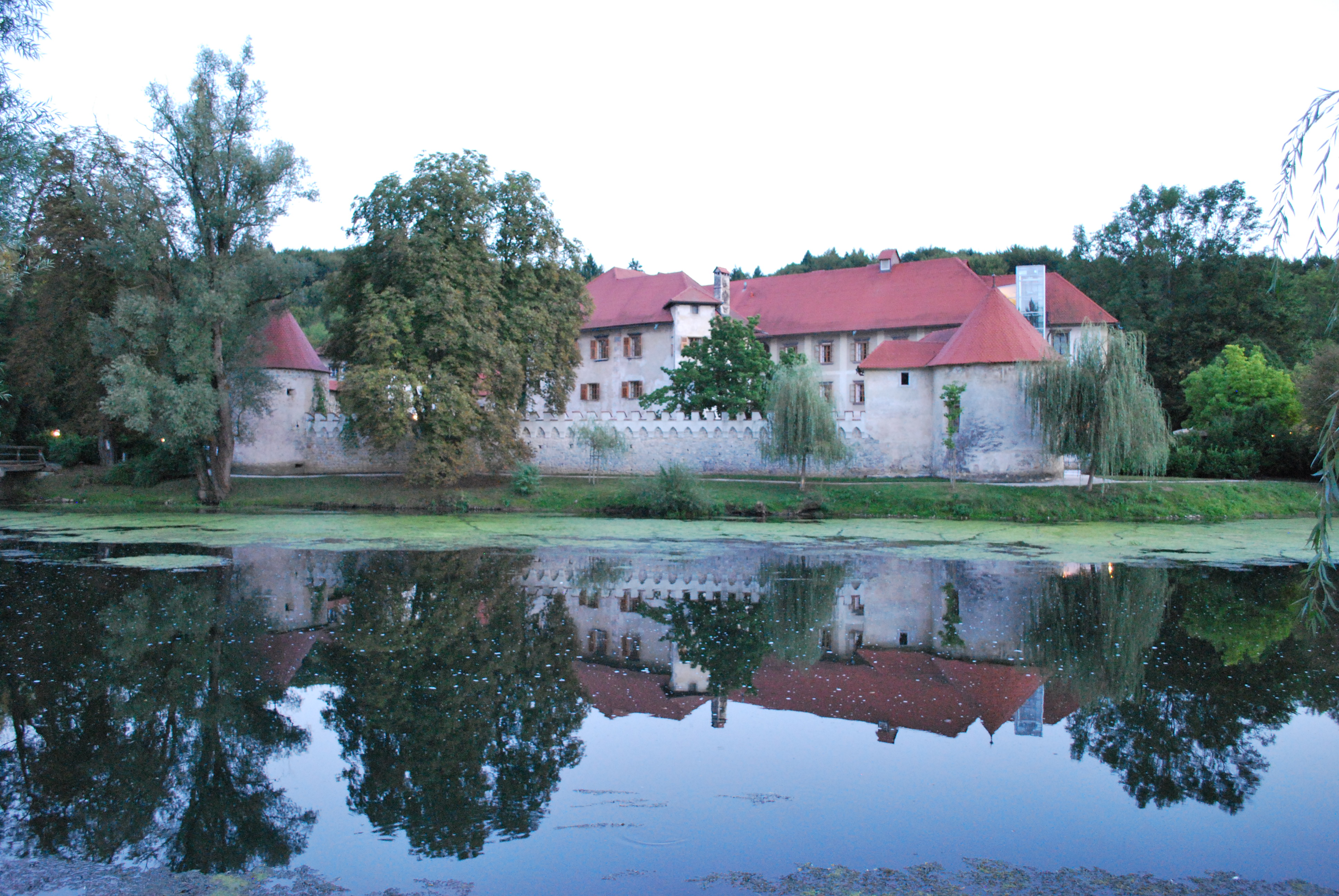
Krka River (northern view) of the castle

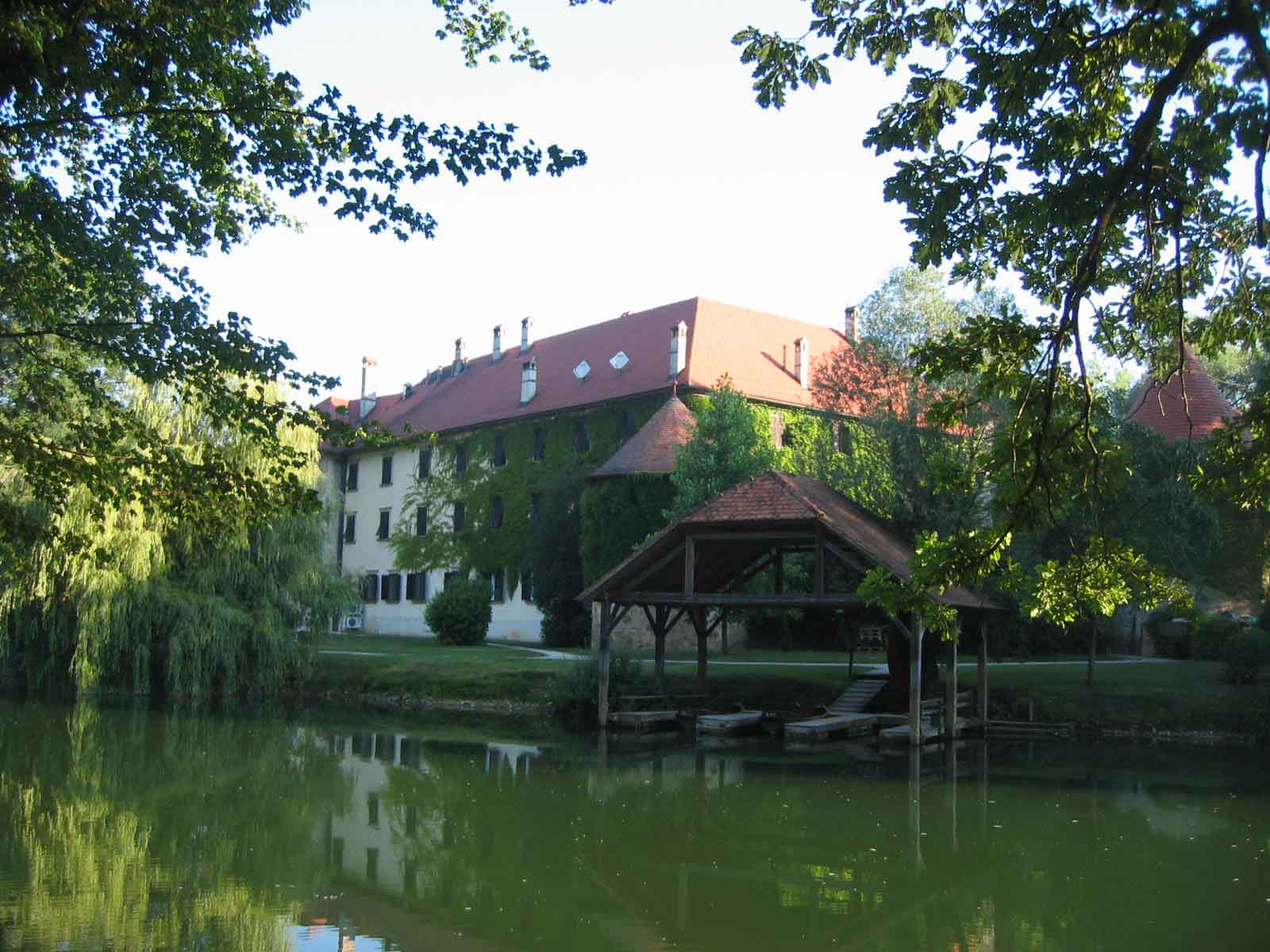
Krka River (southern channel view) of Otočec Castle with the boathouse

Otočec Castle (Slovene: Grad Otočec, in older sources Otočič; German: Burg Werth, Burg Wördl) is a castle hotel on a small island in the middle of the Krka River in Otočec, Slovenia. It is the only water castle in Slovenia. The name Otočec means 'small island'. The town of Otočec was renamed in 1952 by the communist government from the religious name Sveti Peter 'Saint Peter' to Otočec, and the castle itself was renamed from its former German name Werth to Otočec.

== Overview ==
The castle was first mentioned in documents in the 13th century, and the walls are said to date to 1252. Of the 30 small islets in the Krka River in this area, Otočec Castle is on the largest island, which was formed by cutting a southern channel around the castle, in order to form a moat around it.

The island is linked to both banks of the river by two wooden bridges (one northern bridge and one southern bridge), so that one can drive from either the north side or the south side, straight through the islet, to the opposite side of the river. There is parking at the entrance of the northern bridge and on the islet itself, but there is no parking at the entrance to the southern bridge.

Otočec Castle has now been converted into a small luxury hotel, and it also has a world–class restaurant on site. Bradt Travel Guides calls it "one of the most famous hotels in Slovenia". It is also a member of Relais & Châteaux, which is a global fellowship of individually owned and operated luxury hotels and restaurants.

There is also a boat house (located on the southern channel at the back of the castle). There is also a golf course, a castle park, and an adventure park, which includes a ropes course for children and recreational climbers on the island.

== History ==
The castle was once owned by Ivan Lenković, the leader of the Uskoks, and the chief commander of the Croatia-Slavonia March, which was at one time a province straddling the southern borderland of the Habsburg monarchy, and later the Austrian Empire and Austro-Hungarian Empire. The writer Ivan Tavčar set two of his novels at the castle, Otok and Struga and Janez Sonce. The castle was home to the de Werde nobles in the 13th century, who were also known as the Knights of Otočec, and the other tenants were the Villanders of Tyrol.

Before World War II the castle was owned by the House of Marghieri de Commadona. At the beginning of World War II the castle was seized by the Italians and used as a fortress. In 1942, it was burnt by the Partisans and only ruins remained of the two bridges. The castle's restoration began in 1952 with the restoration of the roof and lasted for 6 years, with the help of various international work brigades. In 1959, the first restaurant was opened in the restored castle. Over the next few decades the castle changed its appearance until it was restored to its original Gothic and Renaissance appearance.

== Highways ==
Otočec Castle can be reached by taking the A2 Motorway from Novo Mesto to Otočec, which is part of Pan-European Corridor X.
