= Wasserschloss Wilkinghege =

Country estate in Kinderhaus, Münster, Germany

Coordinates: 51°59′16″N 7°35′06″E

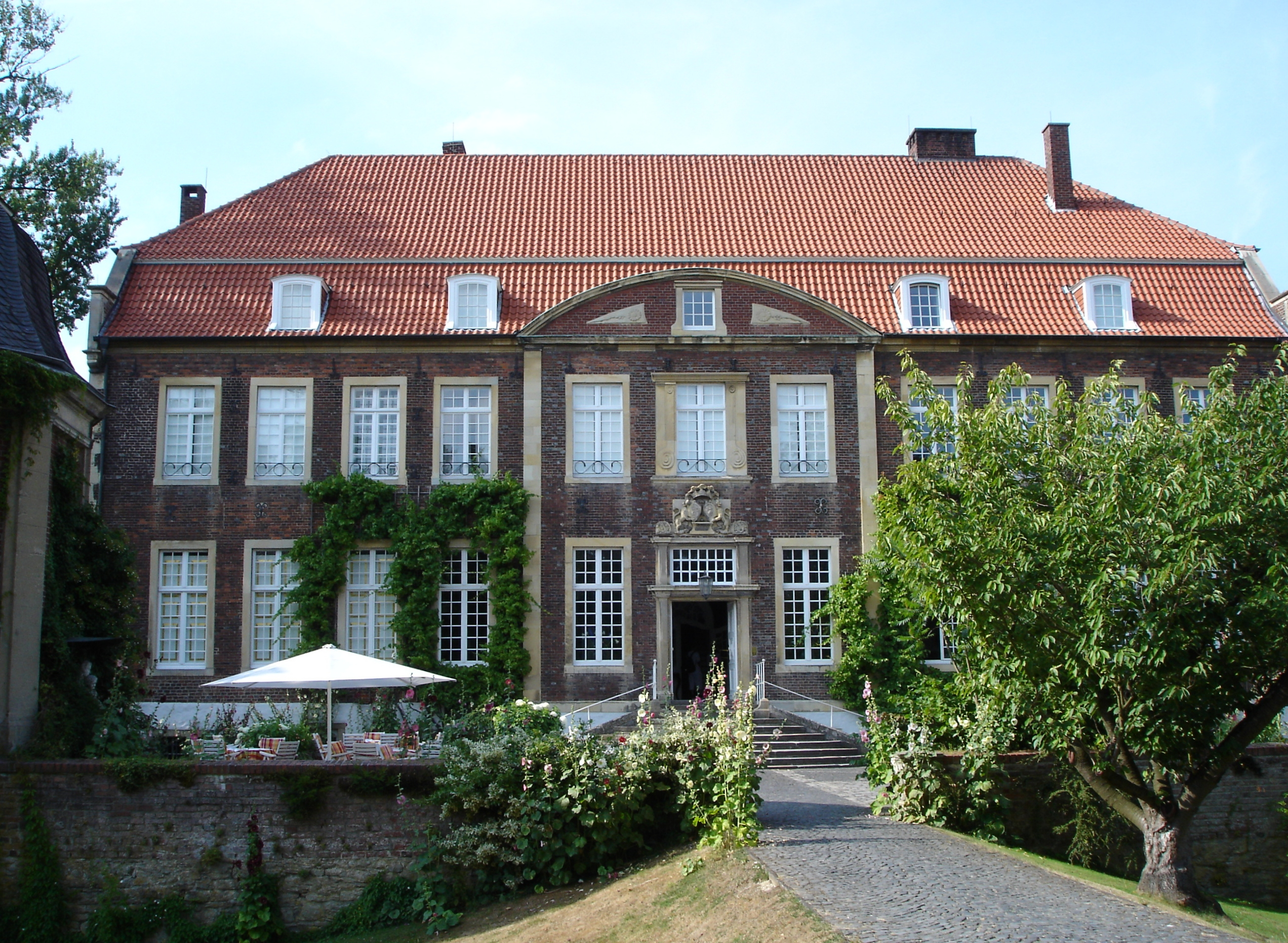
Wasserschloss Wilkinghege

The Wasserschloss Wilkinghege is a country estate in Kinderhaus, part of the Westphalian city of Münster, Germany. It is built in Renaissance style. Since 1955 it has been used as a hotel with a golf course.

== History ==
In the year 1311 a moated castle (German Wasserburg) Wilkinghege appears for the first time in an official document. It was a castle that served defensive purposes and was held as a fief by the Rhemen zu Barenfeld family; in the 14th century it was transferred to the Lords von Kleihorst.

Beginning in 1550 the old castle was replaced by the country estate, now a Wasserschloss in German, indicating that although it still had a moat, this was now an element of style; the castle was no longer military in function. The owners were the Steveninck zu Broich family. In 1719 it was rebuilt by Gottfried Laurenz Pictorius in the Mannerist style for Herr von Harde and his wife Katharina von Keppel. In the following years the castle's ownership changed several times, but in 1779 it was again in the possession of the Rhemen zu Barenfeld family.

After that family died out, the new owners became the Winnecken family, who still own the estate, together with the surrounding lands.

In 1958 the building caught fire. It was rebuilt largely true to the original, so that it still has the spirit of a castle.

== Famous guests ==
In the course of the centuries, many well known people have visited the fortress and the castle, including:

- Prince-bishop Franz von Waldeck
- Prince-bishop Christoph Bernhard Graf von Galen
- General Jean-Baptiste Kléber
- Franz von Fürstenberg
- Poet Annette von Droste-Hülshoff
