= Reinharz =

Reinharz or Reinhartz is a surname. Notable people with the surname include:

- Adele Reinhartz (born 1953), Canadian academic
- Jehuda Reinharz (born 1944), American academic, husband of Shulamit
- Shulamit Reinharz (born 1946), American academic

== See also ==
- Reinhart
