= La Royère Castle =

Castle in Wallonia, Belgium

Coordinates: 50.675°N 3.275°E

- Wallonia, Belgium
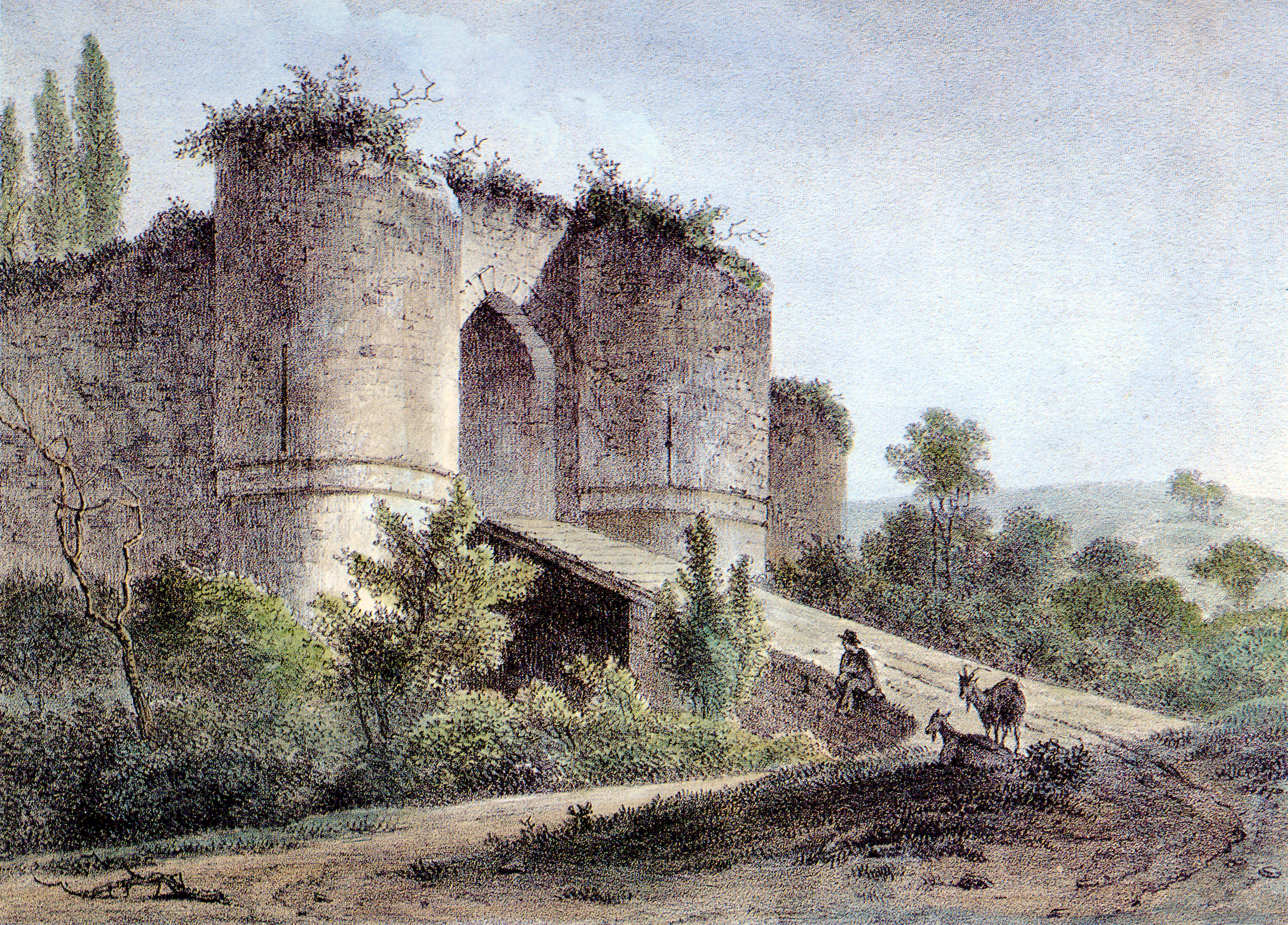

Site information
- Type: Castle

La Royère Castle (French: Château de la Royère) is a ruined medieval castle in Néchin in the municipality of Estaimpuis, province of Hainaut, Wallonia, Belgium.

== See also ==
- List of castles in Belgium
