= Örup Castle =

Building in Skåne County, Sweden

- Örups slott
- Tomelilla Municipality
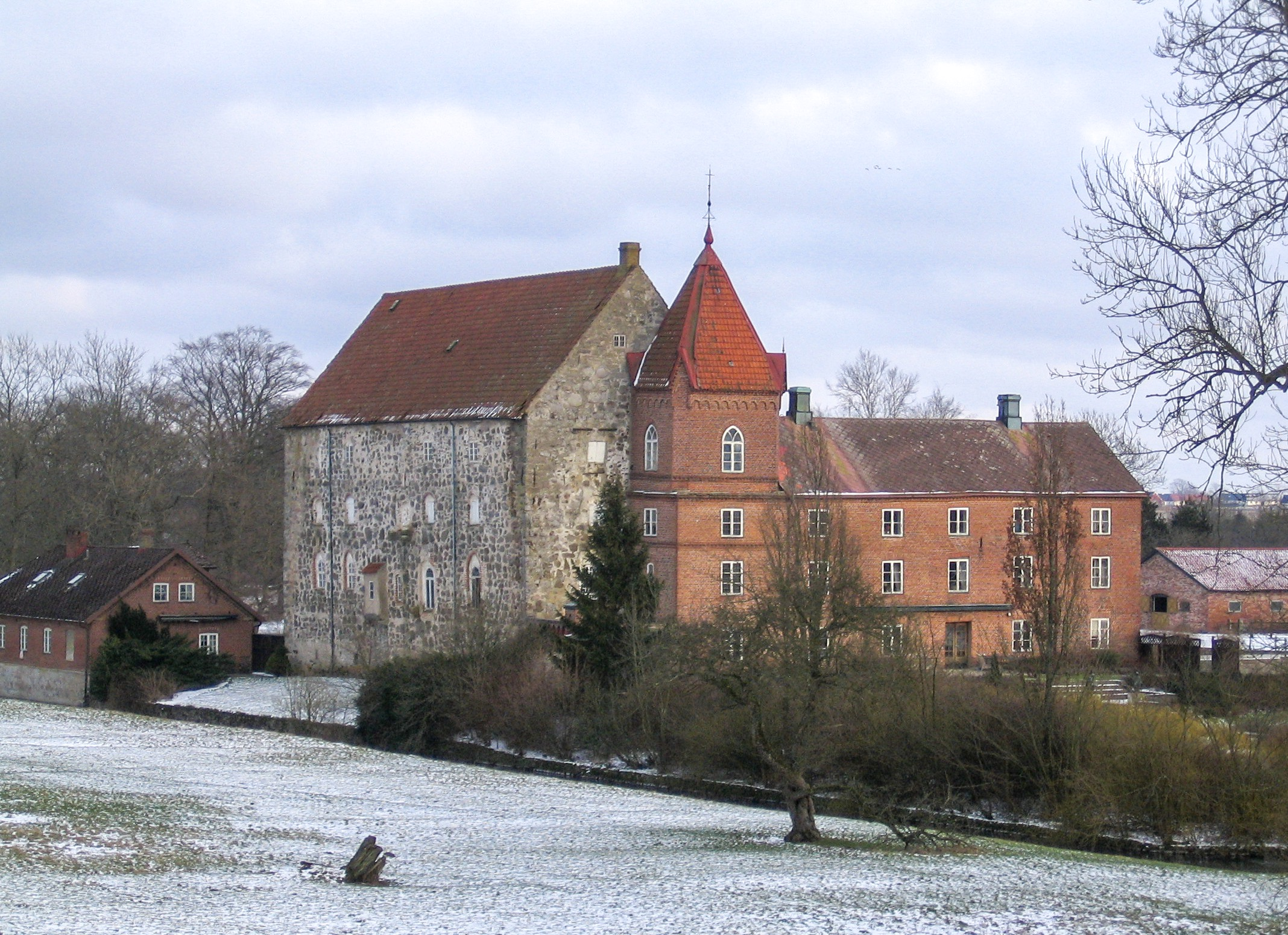
- Örup Castle

Site information
- Type: Castle
- Open to the public: No

Location
- Scania, Sweden
- Coordinates: 55.521708°N 13.936691°E

Site history
- Built: 1490s

Örup Castle (Swedish: Örups slott) is a castle in Tomelilla Municipality, Scania, in southern Sweden. Located a few kilometers south of Tomelilla, together with Glimmingehus, Bollerup Castle and Tosterup Castle, the castles were built during the late Middle Ages. They were constructed as defensive structures during a period of conflict, when Swedish and Danish forces contested power and local lords sought to protect their territories from external threats.

== See also ==
- List of castles in Sweden
