= Novo Mesto (National Assembly constituency) =

Constituency in Slovenia

- Constituency for the National Assembly
- Location of Novo Mesto within Slovenia
- Municipality: List: Brežice; Črnomelj; Dolenjske Toplice; Hrastnik; Ivančna Gorica (part); Kostanjevica na Krki; Krško; Laško; Litija; Metlika; Mirna; Mirna Peč; Mokronog-Trebelno; Novo Mesto; Radeče; Semič; Šentjernej; Šentrupert; Sevnica; Škocjan; Šmarješke Toplice; Šmartno pri Litiji; Straža; Trbovlje; Trebnje; Zagorje ob Savi; Žužemberk
- Population: 269,007 (2025)
- Electorate: 217,948 (2026)
- Area: 3,411 km^{2} (2024)

Current Constituency
- Created: 1992
- Seats: 11 (1992–present)
- Deputies: List: Nataša Avšič Bogovič (Svoboda); Anja Bah Žibert (SDS); Klemen Boštjančič (Svoboda); Matjaž Han (SD); Jana Jerman (Svoboda); Franci Kepa (SDS); Tomaž Lisec (SDS); Vinko Logaj (Svoboda); Srečko Ocvirk (SLS); Janez Jože Olovec (SDS); Teo Uranič (Svoboda)
- Electoral districts: List: Brežice; Črnomelj; Hrastnik-Trbovlje; Krško; Laško; Litija; Novo Mesto 1; Novo Mesto 2; Sevnica; Trebnje; Zagorje

Novo Mesto, officially known as the 6th constituency (Slovene: 6. volilna enota), is one of the eight multi-member constituencies (electoral units) of the National Assembly, the national legislature of Slovenia. The constituency was established in 1992 following Slovenia's independence from Yugoslavia. It consists of the municipalities of Brežice, Črnomelj, Dolenjske Toplice, Hrastnik, Kostanjevica na Krki, Krško, Laško, Litija, Metlika, Mirna, Mirna Peč, Mokronog-Trebelno, Novo Mesto, Radeče, Semič, Šentjernej, Šentrupert, Sevnica, Škocjan, Šmarješke Toplice, Šmartno pri Litiji, Straža, Trbovlje, Trebnje, Zagorje ob Savi and Žužemberk, and parts of the municipality of Ivančna Gorica. The constituency currently elects 11 of the 90 members of the National Assembly using the open party-list proportional representation electoral system. At the 2026 parliamentary election the constituency had 217,948 registered electors.

== History ==
The 6th constituency (Novo Mesto) was one of the eight constituencies established by the Determination of Constituencies for the Election of Deputies to the National Assembly Act (ZDVEDZ) (Zakon o določitvi volilnih enot za volitve poslancev v državni zbor (ZDVEDZ)) passed by the Assembly of the Republic of Slovenia (Skupščina Republike Slovenije) in September 1992. It consisted of the municipalities of Brežice, Črnomelj, Hrastnik, Krško, Laško, Metlika, Novo Mesto, Sevnica, Trbovlje, Trebnje and Zagorje ob Savi.

Following the re-organisation of municipalities in October 1994, parts of Črnomelj municipality were transferred to the newly created Semič municipality; parts of Laško municipality were transferred to the newly created Radeče municipality; and parts of Novo Mesto municipality were transferred to the newly created municipalities of Šentjernej and Škocjan.

In August 1998 parts of Novo Mesto municipality were transferred to the newly created municipalities of Dolenjske Toplice, Mirna Peč and Žužemberk. In June 2006 parts of Krško municipality were transferred to the newly created Kostanjevica na Krki municipality; parts of Novo Mesto municipality were transferred to the newly created municipalities of Šmarješke Toplice and Straža; and parts of Trebnje municipality were transferred to the newly created municipalities of Mokronog-Trebelno and Šentrupert. Mirna municipality was created from parts of Trebnje municipality in February 2011.

The municipalities of Litija and Šmartno pri Litiji were transferred from Ljubljana Bežigrad constituency to Novo Mesto constituency in February 2021.

In February 2021 the National Assembly passed Amendments and Supplements to the Determination of Constituencies for the Election of Deputies to the National Assembly Act (ZDVEDZ-B) (Zakon o spremembah in dopolnitvah Zakona o določitvi volilnih enot za volitve poslancev v državni zbor (ZDVEDZ-B)) which defined the Novo Mesto constituency as consisting of the municipalities of Brežice, Črnomelj, Dolenjske Toplice, Hrastnik, Kostanjevica na Krki, Krško, Laško, Litija, Metlika, Mirna, Mirna Peč, Mokronog-Trebelno, Novo Mesto, Radeče, Semič, Šentjernej, Šentrupert, Sevnica, Škocjan, Šmarješke Toplice, Šmartno pri Litiji, Straža, Trbovlje, Trebnje, Zagorje ob Savi and Žužemberk.

== Electoral system ==
Novo Mesto currently elects 11 of the 90 members of the National Assembly using the open party-list proportional representation electoral system. Each constituency is divided into 11 electoral districts (volilni okraji) in which each party stands a single candidate. Electors vote for a candidate of their choice in their electoral district and then the votes received by each party's candidates are aggregated at the constituency level.

Allocation of seats was carried out in two stages. In the first stage, seats are allocated to parties at the constituency level using the Droop quota (Hare quota prior to 2006). In the second stage, unallocated seats from the first stage are aggregated at the national level and allocated to parties using the D'Hondt method (any seats won by the party at the constituency level are subtracted from the party's national seats). Though calculated nationally, national seats are allocated at the constituency level.

Since 2000, only parties that reach the 4% national threshold compete for seats at both constituency and national levels. Prior to this there was no threshold at the constituency level but parties needed to reach 3/88 (c3.4%) to compete for seats at the national level.

Seats won by each party in a constituency are allocated to the candidates with the highest percentage of votes. As a consequence, multiple candidates may be elected from an electoral district whilst others may have no candidates elected. Prior to 2000 parties had the option to have up to 50% of their national seats allocated in the order they appear on their party list (closed list).

== Electoral districts ==
Novo Mesto is divided into 11 electoral districts:

- 1. Črnomelj - municipalities of Črnomelj, Metlika and Semič.
- 2. Novo Mesto 1 - municipalities of Dolenjske Toplice, Mirna Peč, Novo Mesto (Birčna Vas, Brezje, Brezovica pri Stopičah, Črmošnjice pri Stopičah, Dolenje Lakovnice, Dolenji Suhadol, Dolnja Težka Voda, Dolž, Gabrje, Gorenje Lakovnice, Gorenje Mraševo, Gorenji Suhadol, Gornja Težka Voda, Gumberk, Hrib pri Orehku, Hrušica, Iglenik, Jama, Jugorje, Jurna Vas, Konec, Koroška Vas, Laze, Leskovec, Male Brusnice, Mali Cerovec, Mali Orehek, Mali Podljuben, Mihovec, Pangrč Grm, Petane, Plemberk, Podgrad, Pristava, Rajnovšče, Rakovnik pri Birčni Vasi, Ratež, Sela pri Ratežu, Sela pri Zajčjem Vrhu, Stopiče, Stranska Vas, Šentjošt, Travni Dol, Uršna Sela, Velike Brusnice, Veliki Cerovec, Veliki Orehek, Veliki Podljuben, Verdun, Vinja Vas, Vrh pri Ljubnu, Vrhe, Zajčji Vrh pri Stopičah and parts of Križe and Novo Mesto only), Šentjernej, Šmarješke Toplice and Žužemberk.
- 3. Novo Mesto 2 - municipalities of Novo Mesto (Boričevo, Češča Vas, Črešnjice, Daljni Vrh, Dobovo, Dolenja Vas, Dolenje Grčevje, Dolenje Kamenje, Dolenje Karteljevo, Golušnik, Gorenje Grčevje, Gorenje Kamence, Gorenje Kamenje, Gorenje Karteljevo, Gorenje Kronovo, Herinja Vas, Hudo, Jelše pri Otočcu, Koti, Kuzarjev Kal, Lešnica, Lutrško Selo, Mala Cikava, Mali Slatnik, Otočec, Paha, Petelinjek, Potov Vrh, Prečna, Sela pri Štravberku, Sevno, Smolenja Vas, Srebrniče, Srednje Grčevje, Suhor, Škrjanče pri Novem mestu, Štravberk, Trška Gora, Veliki Slatnik, Vrh pri Pahi, Zagrad pri Otočcu, Ždinja Vas, Žihovo Selo and parts of Križe and Novo Mesto only) and Straža.
- 4. Trebnje - municipalities of Mirna, Mokronog-Trebelno, Šentrupert and Trebnje.
- 5. Brežice - municipality of Brežice.
- 6. Krško - municipalities of Kostanjevica na Krki and Krško.
- 7. Sevnica - municipalities of Sevnica and Škocjan.
- 8. Laško - municipalities of Laško and Radeče.
- 9. Litija - municipalities of Ivančna Gorica (Pusti Javor, Radanja Vas, Sela pri Sobračah, Sobrače and Vrh pri Sobračah only), Litija and Šmartno pri Litiji.
- 10. Hrastnik-Trbovlje - municipalities of Hrastnik and Trbovlje.
- 11. Zagorje - municipality of Zagorje ob Savi

== Election results ==
=== Summary ===
Election	Left Levica / ZL / TRS			Social Democrats SD / ZLSD / ZL			Freedom Movement Svoboda			Positive Slovenia PS / LZJ-PS			Liberal Democracy LDS			Let's Connect PoS / SMC			Slovenian People's SLS / SLS-SMS / SLS-SKD			Christian Democrats SKD			New Slovenia NSi			Slovenian Democrats SDS / SDSS			Slovenian Nationalists SNS		
Election	Votes	%	Seats	Votes	%	Seats	Votes	%	Seats	Votes	%	Seats	Votes	%	Seats	Votes	%	Seats	Votes	%	Seats	Votes	%	Seats	Votes	%	Seats	Votes	%	Seats	Votes	%	Seats
2026	6,045	4.02%	0	12,261	8.15%	0	41,768	27.76%	3										with NSi						15,400	10.23%	1	44,224	29.39%	3	4,178	2.78%	0
2022	5,348	3.52%	0	10,408	6.84%	0	51,652	33.96%	4							5,774	3.80%	0	with PoS						9,891	6.50%	0	37,662	24.76%	2	2,683	1.76%	0
2018	7,795	7.70%	0	11,886	11.73%	1										10,892	10.75%	1	5,121	5.06%	0				6,050	5.97%	0	24,876	24.56%	2	5,421	5.35%	0
2014	5,896	5.76%	0	6,759	6.60%	0				2,803	2.74%	0				33,724	32.94%	3	6,175	6.03%	0				5,431	5.30%	0	21,664	21.16%	2	2,304	2.25%	0
2011	1,549	1.20%	0	12,003	9.29%	1				34,178	26.45%	3	3,003	2.32%	0				10,158	7.86%	0				6,108	4.73%	0	35,458	27.44%	3	3,339	2.58%	0
2008				32,301	26.15%	3							9,275	7.51%	0				10,202	8.26%	0	476	0.39%	0	3,825	3.10%	0	33,700	27.29%	3	8,181	6.62%	0
2004				8,853	7.72%	0							28,515	24.88%	2				11,808	10.30%	1				10,013	8.74%	1	28,760	25.09%	3	7,824	6.83%	0
2000				11,661	8.90%	1							52,055	39.73%	4				17,309	13.21%	1	with SLS			10,225	7.80%	0	18,642	14.23%	1	6,005	4.58%	0
1996				11,962	9.23%	1							39,591	30.54%	3				26,609	20.53%	2	13,292	10.25%	1				17,457	13.47%	1	4,426	3.41%	0
1992				19,341	13.35%	1							39,147	27.02%	2				13,648	9.42%	1	22,186	15.32%	1				3,098	2.14%	0	12,668	8.74%	0

(Excludes national seats. Figures in italics represent alliances/joint lists.)

=== Detailed ===
Party has received at least 4% of the vote nationally (since 2000).

==== 2020s ====
===== 2026 =====
Results of the 2026 parliamentary election held on 22 March 2026:

Party		Votes per electoral district											Total votes	%	Seats		
Party		Brežice	Črnomelj	Hrastnik- Trbovlje	Krško	Laško	Litija	Novo Mesto 1	Novo Mesto 2	Sevnica	Trebnje	Zagorje	Total votes	%	Con.	Nat.	Tot.
Slovenian Democratic Party	SDS	3,735	4,016	2,321	4,925	2,889	3,634	7,056	4,834	4,250	4,640	1,924	44,224	29.39%	3	1	4
Freedom Movement	Svoboda	4,316	4,284	5,555	4,176	1,789	3,700	3,581	5,551	2,648	2,628	3,540	41,768	27.76%	3	2	5
New Slovenia – Christian Democrats, Slovenian People's Party and Focus	NSi-SLS- FOKUS	778	1,307	618	1,650	1,141	1,674	2,054	1,723	1,874	1,651	930	15,400	10.23%	1	0	1
Social Democrats	SD	811	1,513	1,684	899	2,058	574	1,099	1,261	752	808	802	12,261	8.15%	0	1	1
Democrats	D	940	708	496	963	521	766	1,381	1,335	610	1,006	513	9,239	6.14%	0	0	0
Resni.ca	Resni.ca	572	662	800	767	528	573	824	794	530	597	484	7,131	4.74%	0	0	0
The Left and Vesna – Green Party	Levica-Vesna	679	492	776	592	320	499	446	895	271	339	736	6,045	4.02%	0	0	0
Prerod	Prerod	372	518	317	493	212	420	591	760	274	338	245	4,540	3.02%	0	0	0
Slovenian National Party	SNS	419	380	336	542	296	281	602	454	320	348	200	4,178	2.78%	0	0	0
Pirate Party	Pirati	244	207	275	234	198	299	288	406	161	201	189	2,702	1.80%	0	0	0
Greens of Slovenia and Party of Generations	ZS-SG	36	66	80	203	16	28	94	96	30	35	38	722	0.48%	0	0	0
We, Socialists!	MI!	47	91	73	57	67	58	60	94	38	41	59	685	0.46%	0	0	0
Alternative for Slovenia	AzaS	54	73	43	36	22	75	54	60	49	53	33	552	0.37%	0	0	0
Voice of Pensioners	GU	72	51	91	40	18	24	50	65	40	45	38	534	0.35%	0	0	0
Karl Erjavec - Trust Party	SZ	83	38	46	58	24	29	47	76	28	31	34	494	0.33%	0	0	0
Valid votes		13,158	14,406	13,511	15,635	10,099	12,634	18,227	18,404	11,875	12,761	9,765	150,475	100.00%	7	4	11
Rejected votes		155	160	137	141	148	129	208	146	161	123	84	1,592	1.05%			
Total polled		13,313	14,566	13,648	15,776	10,247	12,763	18,435	18,550	12,036	12,884	9,849	152,067	69.77%			
Registered electors		21,151	22,742	20,676	23,174	14,560	17,299	24,536	25,936	17,002	17,281	13,591	217,948				
Turnout		62.94%	64.05%	66.01%	68.08%	70.38%	73.78%	75.13%	71.52%	70.79%	74.56%	72.47%	69.77%				

The following candidates were elected:

- Constituency seats - Nataša Avšič Bogovič (Svoboda, Brežice & Hrastnik-Trbovlje), 9,871 votes; Anja Bah Žibert (SDS, Novo Mesto 1), 7,056 votes; Jana Jerman (Svoboda, Črnomelj), 4,284 votes; Franci Kepa (SDS, Trebnje), 4,640 votes; Tomaž Lisec (SDS, Sevnica), 4,250 votes; Srečko Ocvirk (NSi-SLS-FOKUS, Sevnica), 1,874 votes; and Teo Uranič (Svoboda, Zagorje), 3,540 votes.
- National seats - Klemen Boštjančič (Svoboda, Krško & Novo Mesto 2), 9,727 votes; Matjaž Han (SD, Laško), 2,058 votes; Vinko Logaj (Svoboda, Litija), 3,700 votes; and Janez Jože Olovec (SDS, Krško), 4,925 votes.

===== 2022 =====
Results of the 2022 parliamentary election held on 24 April 2022:

Party		Votes per electoral district											Total votes	%	Seats		
Party		Brežice	Črnomelj	Hrastnik- Trbovlje	Krško	Laško	Litija	Novo Mesto 1	Novo Mesto 2	Sevnica	Trebnje	Zagorje	Total votes	%	Con.	Nat.	Tot.
Freedom Movement	Svoboda	5,280	4,290	6,646	5,828	2,732	4,520	4,367	6,804	3,767	3,241	4,177	51,652	33.96%	4	2	6
Slovenian Democratic Party	SDS	3,378	3,887	2,161	4,024	2,443	3,232	5,794	3,785	3,770	3,608	1,580	37,662	24.76%	2	1	3
Social Democrats	SD	725	1,288	1,525	686	1,876	537	936	1,117	435	610	673	10,408	6.84%	0	1	1
New Slovenia – Christian Democrats	NSi	504	974	501	919	859	671	1,694	1,718	516	1,055	480	9,891	6.50%	0	1	1
List of Marjan Šarec	LMŠ	500	614	547	469	260	473	673	659	384	560	770	5,909	3.89%	0	0	0
Let's Connect Slovenia	PoS	441	371	239	750	282	899	581	383	683	750	395	5,774	3.80%	0	0	0
The Left	Levica	705	519	698	484	309	462	438	759	289	309	376	5,348	3.52%	0	0	0
Resni.ca		304	328	413	378	316	352	563	452	418	469	271	4,264	2.80%	0	0	0
For a Healthy Society	ZSi	180	1,156	102	271	141	212	476	489	180	186	73	3,466	2.28%	0	0	0
Party of Alenka Bratušek	SAB	271	243	455	255	210	276	316	514	249	221	280	3,290	2.16%	0	0	0
Slovenian National Party	SNS	235	173	135	685	146	142	397	254	226	192	98	2,683	1.76%	0	0	0
Our Future and Good Country	SNP-DD	249	149	280	259	145	166	294	393	165	177	132	2,409	1.58%	0	0	0
Our Country		205	99	164	225	190	150	318	182	239	267	250	2,289	1.51%	0	0	0
Vesna – Green Party		106	87	385	133	127	198	194	243	86	120	375	2,054	1.35%	0	0	0
Pirate Party		159	121	176	161	171	198	210	282	148	118	129	1,873	1.23%	0	0	0
Democratic Party of Pensioners of Slovenia	DeSUS	106	258	91	93	60	111	193	285	137	108	49	1,491	0.98%	0	0	0
For the People of Slovenia	ZLS	112	41	135	132	67	94	86	103	82	63	48	963	0.63%	0	0	0
List of Boris Popovič – Let's Digitize Slovenia	LBP	58	28	22	30	53	38	59	40	30	33	29	420	0.28%	0	0	0
Homeland League	DOM	10	15	10	22	16	17	43	34	27	41	8	243	0.16%	0	0	0
Valid votes		13,528	14,641	14,685	15,804	10,403	12,748	17,632	18,496	11,831	12,128	10,193	152,089	100.00%	6	5	11
Rejected votes		135	197	146	159	118	140	199	174	134	155	79	1,636	1.06%			
Total polled		13,663	14,838	14,831	15,963	10,521	12,888	17,831	18,670	11,965	12,283	10,272	153,725	70.35%			
Registered electors		21,220	22,804	21,223	23,408	14,854	17,194	24,415	25,700	17,115	16,877	13,694	218,504				
Turnout		64.39%	65.07%	69.88%	68.19%	70.83%	74.96%	73.03%	72.65%	69.91%	72.78%	75.01%	70.35%				

The following candidates were elected:

- Constituency seats - Nataša Avšič Bogovič (Svoboda, Brežice), 5,280 votes; Anja Bah Žibert (SDS, Novo Mesto 1), 5,794 votes; Tomaž Lisec (SDS, Sevnica), 3,770 votes; Gapi Ovnik (Svoboda, Hrastnik-Trbovlje), 6,646 votes; Teo Uranič (Svoboda, Zagorje), 4,177 votes; and Tamara Vonta (Svoboda, Krško), 5,828 votes.
- National seats - Vida Čadonič Špelič (NSi, Novo Mesto 1), 1,694 votes; Jožica Derganc (Svoboda, Novo Mesto 2), 6,804 votes; Matjaž Han (SD, Laško), 1,876 votes; Franci Kepa (SDS, Trebnje), 3,608 votes; and Franc Props (Svoboda, Litija), 4,520 votes.

Substitutions:

- Matjaž Han (SD, Laško) forfeited his seat on 1 June 2022 upon being elected to the government and was replaced by Soniboj Knežak (SD, Hrastnik-Trbovlje) on 9 June 2022.
- Franc Props (Svoboda, Litija) forfeited his seat on 7 December 2023 upon being elected to the government and was replaced by Jernej Žnidaršič (Svoboda, Sevnica) on 13 December 2023.

==== 2010s ====
===== 2018 =====
Results of the 2018 parliamentary election held on 3 June 2018:

Party		Votes per electoral district											Total votes	%	Seats		
Party		Brežice	Črnomelj	Hrastnik	Krško	Laško	Novo Mesto 1	Novo Mesto 2	Sevnica	Trbovlje	Trebnje	Zagorje ob Savi	Total votes	%	Con.	Nat.	Tot.
Slovenian Democratic Party	SDS	2,450	2,992	487	2,660	1,778	4,163	2,956	2,506	1,230	2,394	1,260	24,876	24.56%	2	1	3
Social Democrats	SD	594	1,755	800	922	1,917	1,111	1,516	451	993	1,091	736	11,886	11.73%	1	1	2
List of Marjan Šarec	LMŠ	878	1,142	589	1,217	756	1,187	1,298	1,123	954	825	1,454	11,423	11.28%	1	0	1
Modern Centre Party	SMC	1,731	1,119	466	1,013	513	1,038	1,636	608	809	973	986	10,892	10.75%	1	0	1
The Left	Levica	1,114	654	418	954	466	643	1,125	490	828	415	688	7,795	7.70%	0	1	1
New Slovenia – Christian Democrats	NSi	425	744	89	525	580	1,076	850	356	269	745	391	6,050	5.97%	0	1	1
Slovenian National Party	SNS	509	611	162	877	314	860	790	353	259	387	299	5,421	5.35%	0	1	1
Democratic Party of Pensioners of Slovenia	DeSUS	535	831	373	434	286	484	802	359	534	262	411	5,311	5.24%	0	1	1
Slovenian People's Party	SLS	235	229	42	1,399	518	697	214	675	95	643	374	5,121	5.06%	0	0	0
Party of Alenka Bratušek	SAB	519	328	222	498	249	389	662	259	472	227	475	4,300	4.24%	0	0	0
Good Country	DD	114	198	53	152	80	374	232	74	139	133	59	1,608	1.59%	0	0	0
Pirate Party		97	120	55	110	164	177	275	106	100	124	106	1,434	1.42%	0	0	0
United Left and Unity	ZLS	90	94	151	110	44	37	81	114	177	111	65	1,074	1.06%	0	0	0
Andrej Čuš and Greens of Slovenia	AČZS	63	59	13	96	54	177	111	49	76	85	67	850	0.84%	0	0	0
Economic Active Party	GAS	27	27	4	16	14	286	233	10	14	30	10	671	0.66%	0	0	0
List of Journalist Bojan Požar	LNBP	44	50	21	46	60	90	91	39	49	31	46	567	0.56%	0	0	0
United Slovenia	ZSi	58	28	9	98	59	80	52	49	34	45	27	539	0.53%	0	0	0
For a Healthy Society	ZD	40	43	10	36	28	76	98	28	19	37	41	456	0.45%	0	0	0
Solidarity–For a Fair Society!		14	16	11	14	10	49	233	6	33	24	8	418	0.41%	0	0	0
Movement Together Forward	GSN	50	9	10	28	18	21	54	20	17	29	20	276	0.27%	0	0	0
Socialist Party of Slovenia	SPS	14	20	28	19	7	16	16	7	15	12	21	175	0.17%	0	0	0
Party of Slovenian People	SSN	16	12	1	16	3	22	22	14	12	25	13	156	0.15%	0	0	0
Valid votes		9,617	11,081	4,014	11,240	7,918	13,053	13,347	7,696	7,128	8,648	7,557	101,299	100.00%	5	6	11
Rejected votes		94	100	47	112	115	184	165	106	90	94	84	1,191	1.16%			
Total polled		9,711	11,181	4,061	11,352	8,033	13,237	13,512	7,802	7,218	8,742	7,641	102,490	50.24%			
Registered electors		21,471	23,140	8,025	23,810	15,231	26,560	25,849	15,316	14,019	16,555	14,025	204,001				
Turnout		45.23%	48.32%	50.60%	47.68%	52.74%	49.84%	52.27%	50.94%	51.49%	52.81%	54.48%	50.24%				

The following candidates were elected:

- Constituency seats - Anja Bah Žibert (SDS, Novo Mesto 1), 4,163 votes; Matjaž Han (SD, Laško), 1,917 votes; Tomaž Lisec (SDS, Sevnica), 2,506 votes; Rudi Medved (LMŠ, Zagorje ob Savi), 1,454 votes; and Igor Zorčič (SMC, Brežice), 1,731 votes.
- National seats - Ivan Hršak (DeSUS, Hrastnik), 373 votes; Franci Kepa (SDS, Trebnje), 2,394 votes; Soniboj Knežak (SD, Hrastnik), 800 votes; Blaž Pavlin (NSi, Trebnje), 745 votes; Dušan Šiško (SNS, Krško), 877 votes; and Primož Siter (Levica, Trbovlje), 828 votes.

Substitutions:

- Rudi Medved (LMŠ, Zagorje ob Savi) forfeited his seat on 13 September 2018 upon being elected to the government and was replaced by Nina Maurovič (LMŠ, Hrastnik) on 26 September 2018.
- Nina Maurovič (LMŠ, Hrastnik) forfeited her seat on 13 March 2020 when Rudi Medved (LMŠ, Zagorje ob Savi) lost his government position, regaining his seat.

===== 2014 =====
Results of the 2014 parliamentary election held on 13 July 2014:

Party		Votes per electoral district											Total votes	%	Seats		
Party		Brežice	Črnomelj- Metlika	Hrastnik	Krško	Laško	Novo Mesto 1	Novo Mesto 2	Sevnica	Trbovlje	Trebnje	Zagorje	Total votes	%	Con.	Nat.	Tot.
Modern Centre Party	SMC	3,565	3,131	1,547	3,665	2,067	3,495	5,033	2,399	2,770	2,947	3,105	33,724	32.94%	3	2	5
Slovenian Democratic Party	SDS	2,466	1,816	334	2,490	1,503	3,977	2,767	1,943	974	2,314	1,080	21,664	21.16%	2	1	3
Democratic Party of Pensioners of Slovenia	DeSUS	909	1,316	797	1,126	878	1,187	1,499	843	1,130	597	936	11,218	10.96%	1	0	1
Social Democrats	SD	406	1,265	395	406	1,332	505	829	265	601	269	486	6,759	6.60%	0	1	1
Slovenian People's Party	SLS	329	672	84	1,510	428	694	383	934	155	600	386	6,175	6.03%	0	0	0
United Left	ZL	776	375	247	693	311	511	738	370	919	540	416	5,896	5.76%	0	1	1
New Slovenia – Christian Democrats	NSi	260	876	58	409	530	1,143	717	259	137	636	406	5,431	5.30%	0	0	0
Alliance of Alenka Bratušek	ZaAB	385	317	251	334	299	461	791	218	387	245	376	4,064	3.97%	0	0	0
Positive Slovenia	PS	251	643	272	165	95	206	369	112	330	111	249	2,803	2.74%	0	0	0
Slovenian National Party	SNS	155	314	71	301	170	400	349	132	85	186	141	2,304	2.25%	0	0	0
Verjamem		38	37	24	96	34	95	90	31	36	37	47	565	0.55%	0	0	0
Pirate Party		70	0	32	84	124	0	194	60	0	0	0	564	0.55%	0	0	0
Civic List	DL	50	45	75	36	23	52	56	31	29	37	81	515	0.50%	0	0	0
Greens of Slovenia	ZS	50	38	23	59	45	84	83	18	32	28	35	495	0.48%	0	0	0
Equal Land–Forward Slovenia	ED-NPS	19	18	5	22	12	46	35	14	6	24	0	201	0.20%	0	0	0
Valid votes		9,729	10,863	4,215	11,396	7,851	12,856	13,933	7,629	7,591	8,571	7,744	102,378	100.00%	6	5	11
Rejected votes		115	170	51	138	116	209	166	96	120	127	92	1,400	1.35%			
Total polled		9,844	11,033	4,266	11,534	7,967	13,065	14,099	7,725	7,711	8,698	7,836	103,778	50.54%			
Registered electors		21,555	23,384	8,301	24,034	15,421	26,819	25,893	14,771	14,437	16,476	14,249	205,340				
Turnout		45.67%	47.18%	51.39%	47.99%	51.66%	48.72%	54.45%	52.30%	53.41%	52.79%	54.99%	50.54%				

The following candidates were elected:

- Constituency seats - Anja Bah Žibert (SDS, Novo Mesto 1), 3,977 votes; Marjan Dolinšek (SMC, Zagorje), 3,105 votes; Ivan Hršak (DeSUS, Hrastnik), 797 votes; Zvonko Lah (SDS, Trebnje), 2,314 votes; Vojka Šergan (SMC, Hrastnik), 1,547 votes; and Igor Zorčič (SMC, Brežice), 3,565 votes.
- National seats - Urška Ban (SMC, Novo Mesto 2), 5,033 votes; Irena Grošelj Košnik (SMC, Trbovlje), 2,770 votes; Matjaž Han (SD, Laško), 1,332 votes; Tomaž Lisec (SDS, Sevnica), 1,943 votes; and Luka Mesec (ZL, Trbovlje), 919 votes.

===== 2011 =====
Results of the 2011 parliamentary election held on 4 December 2011:

Party		Votes per electoral district											Total votes	%	Seats		
Party		Brežice	Črnomelj- Metlika	Hrastnik	Krško	Laško	Novo Mesto 1	Novo Mesto 2	Sevnica	Trbovlje	Trebnje	Zagorje	Total votes	%	Con.	Nat.	Tot.
Slovenian Democratic Party	SDS	4,440	2,877	674	3,704	2,585	6,639	4,348	3,079	1,821	3,604	1,687	35,458	27.44%	3	1	4
Zoran Janković's List – Positive Slovenia	LZJ-PS	3,553	4,850	2,190	3,253	1,427	2,907	5,648	1,912	3,282	2,105	3,051	34,178	26.45%	3	0	3
Social Democrats	SD	930	1,299	609	919	2,138	1,150	1,420	552	1,198	734	1,054	12,003	9.29%	1	0	1
Slovenian People's Party	SLS	463	1,259	127	2,895	611	1,357	739	1,269	194	795	449	10,158	7.86%	0	1	1
Democratic Party of Pensioners of Slovenia	DeSUS	855	1,132	581	891	797	1,033	1,482	894	826	499	884	9,874	7.64%	0	1	1
Gregor Virant's Civic List	LGV	711	649	369	951	883	1,251	1,476	540	571	813	925	9,139	7.07%	0	1	1
New Slovenia – Christian People's Party	NSi	366	1,066	53	518	590	985	899	251	219	749	412	6,108	4.73%	0	0	0
Slovenian National Party	SNS	227	225	103	400	134	533	482	182	685	202	166	3,339	2.58%	0	0	0
Liberal Democracy of Slovenia	LDS	243	559	489	222	145	307	246	103	229	178	282	3,003	2.32%	0	0	0
Party for Sustainable; Development of Slovenia	TRS	172	139	52	155	121	134	189	137	140	110	200	1,549	1.20%	0	0	0
Democratic Labour Party	DSD	115	107	77	92	51	165	113	112	160	417	95	1,504	1.16%	0	0	0
Youth Party – European Greens	SMS-Z	118	173	79	113	66	145	78	51	31	166	111	1,131	0.88%	0	0	0
Zares		56	95	11	63	35	73	182	17	102	16	102	752	0.58%	0	0	0
Greens of Slovenia	ZS	58	37	8	36	32	68	76	32	24	34	30	435	0.34%	0	0	0
Movement for Slovenia	GZS	22	20	7	71	23	118	40	15	22	36	41	415	0.32%	0	0	0
Party of Equal Opportunities	SEM-Si	7	18	8	14	11	28	27	6	11	13	21	164	0.13%	0	0	0
Valid votes		12,336	14,505	5,437	14,297	9,649	16,893	17,445	9,152	9,515	10,471	9,510	129,210	100.00%	7	4	11
Rejected votes		167	310	131	228	232	365	308	180	196	218	182	2,517	1.91%			
Total polled		12,503	14,815	5,568	14,525	9,881	17,258	17,753	9,332	9,711	10,689	9,692	131,727	64.04%			
Registered electors		21,554	23,328	8,527	24,196	15,594	26,427	25,859	14,837	14,772	16,265	14,339	205,698				
Turnout		58.01%	63.51%	65.30%	60.03%	63.36%	65.30%	68.65%	62.90%	65.74%	65.72%	67.59%	64.04%				

The following candidates were elected:

- Constituency seats - Renata Brunskole (LZJ-PS, Črnomelj-Metlika), 4,850 votes; Ivan Grill (SDS, Novo Mesto 1), 6,639 votes; Matjaž Han (SD, Laško), 2,138 votes; Zvonko Lah (SDS, Trebnje), 3,604 votes; Jože Velikonja (LZJ-PS, Hrastnik), 2,190 votes; Andrej Vizjak (SDS, Brežice), 4,440 votes; and Barbara Žgajner Tavš (LZJ-PS, Trbovlje), 3,282 votes.
- National seats - Franc Bogovič (SLS, Krško), 2,895 votes; Katarina Hočevar (LGV, Zagorje), 925 votes; Ivan Hršak (DeSUS, Hrastnik), 581 votes; and Tomaž Lisec (SDS, Sevnica), 3,079 votes.

Substitutions:

- Franc Bogovič (SLS, Krško) forfeited his seat on 10 February 2012 upon being elected to the government and was replaced by Roman Žveglič (SLS, Sevnica) on 14 February 2012.
- Andrej Vizjak (SDS, Brežice) forfeited his seat on 10 February 2012 upon being elected to the government and was replaced by Damjana Petavar Dobovšek (SDS, Laško) on 14 February 2012.
- Damjana Petavar Dobovšek (SDS, Laško) forfeited his seat on 20 March 2013 when Andrej Vizjak (SDS, Brežice) lost his government position, regaining his seat.
- Roman Žveglič (SLS, Sevnica) forfeited his seat on 20 March 2013 when Franc Bogovič (SLS, Krško) lost his government position, regaining his seat.
- Franc Bogovič (SLS, Krško) forfeited his seat on 1 July 2014 upon being elected to the European Parliament and was replaced by Roman Žveglič (SLS, Sevnica) on 4 July 2014.

==== 2000s ====
===== 2008 =====
Results of the 2008 parliamentary election held on 21 September 2008:

Party		Votes per electoral district											Total votes	%	Seats		
Party		Brežice	Črnomelj- Metlika	Hrastnik	Krško	Laško	Novo Mesto 1	Novo Mesto 2	Sevnica	Trbovlje	Trebnje	Zagorje	Total votes	%	Con.	Nat.	Tot.
Slovenian Democratic Party	SDS	4,516	2,595	721	3,572	2,534	6,247	4,766	2,575	1,591	2,856	1,727	33,700	27.29%	3	0	3
Social Democrats	SD	2,637	4,379	1,652	3,088	3,476	2,620	5,035	1,655	3,387	2,065	2,307	32,301	26.15%	3	0	3
Zares		1,272	927	409	1,139	818	1,148	2,249	912	944	544	1,104	11,466	9.28%	1	0	1
Democratic Party of Pensioners of Slovenia	DeSUS	960	1,256	626	886	729	1,191	1,308	773	722	1,672	628	10,751	8.70%	1	0	1
Slovenian People's Party and Youth Party of Slovenia	SLS-SMS	356	2,603	59	2,853	372	1,138	221	1,828	75	401	296	10,202	8.26%	0	1	1
Liberal Democracy of Slovenia	LDS	672	360	1,464	518	310	740	959	268	1,002	523	2,459	9,275	7.51%	0	1	1
Slovenian National Party	SNS	730	575	295	909	475	1,229	985	383	1,455	747	398	8,181	6.62%	0	1	1
New Slovenia – Christian People's Party	NSi	127	474	28	316	521	560	443	186	106	820	244	3,825	3.10%	0	0	0
Lipa		123	99	128	211	137	187	191	105	326	77	130	1,714	1.39%	0	0	0
Greens of Slovenia	ZS	60	51	14	41	28	93	116	27	30	38	24	522	0.42%	0	0	0
Christian Democratic Party	SKD	39	35	60	35	36	64	76	67	22	21	21	476	0.39%	0	0	0
List for Clear Drinking Water	LZČPV	46	29	7	37	22	76	75	12	12	39	28	383	0.31%	0	0	0
List for Justice and Development	LPR	46	27	7	23	13	33	28	86	10	21	9	303	0.25%	0	0	0
Party of Slovenian People	SSN	25	54	4	25	15	38	27	13	11	25	14	251	0.20%	0	0	0
Green Coalition: Green Party and Green Progress	ZL-ZP	8	17	8	7	9	9	23	8	38	8	19	154	0.12%	0	0	0
Valid votes		11,617	13,481	5,482	13,660	9,495	15,373	16,502	8,898	9,731	9,857	9,408	123,504	100.00%	8	3	11
Rejected votes		177	301	117	308	234	371	267	172	178	232	194	2,551	2.02%			
Total polled		11,794	13,782	5,599	13,968	9,729	15,744	16,769	9,070	9,909	10,089	9,602	126,055	61.61%			
Registered electors		21,429	23,046	8,764	24,176	15,643	25,866	25,537	14,849	15,056	15,838	14,390	204,594				
Turnout		55.04%	59.80%	63.89%	57.78%	62.19%	60.87%	65.67%	61.08%	65.81%	63.70%	66.73%	61.61%				

The following candidates were elected:

- Constituency seats - Renata Brunskole (SD, Črnomelj-Metlika), 4,379 votes; Ivan Grill (SDS, Novo Mesto 1), 6,247 votes; Matjaž Han (SD, Laško), 3,476 votes; Franci Kek (Zares, Novo Mesto 2), 2,249 votes; Zvonko Lah (SDS, Trebnje), 2,856 votes; Andrej Vizjak (SDS, Brežice), 4,516 votes; Franc Žnidaršič (DeSUS, Trebnje), 1,672 votes; and Melita Župevc (SD, Trbovlje), 3,387 votes.
- National seats - Bogdan Barovič (SNS, Trbovlje), 1,455 votes; Franc Bogovič (SLS-SMS, Krško), 2,853 votes; and Miran Jerič (LDS, Hrastnik), 1,464 votes.

===== 2004 =====
Results of the 2004 parliamentary election held on 3 October 2004:

Party		Votes per electoral district											Total votes	%	Seats		
Party		Brežice	Črnomelj- Metlika	Hrastnik	Krško	Laško	Novo Mesto 1	Novo Mesto 2	Sevnica	Trbovlje	Trebnje	Zagorje	Total votes	%	Con.	Nat.	Tot.
Slovenian Democratic Party	SDS	4,572	1,910	860	3,580	2,110	3,982	3,839	2,519	1,548	2,243	1,597	28,760	25.09%	3	0	3
Liberal Democracy of Slovenia	LDS	2,696	2,427	2,280	2,671	1,517	2,541	4,816	1,395	2,375	1,290	4,507	28,515	24.88%	2	1	3
Slovenian People's Party	SLS	279	2,794	103	1,600	870	1,893	692	2,403	263	586	325	11,808	10.30%	1	0	1
New Slovenia – Christian People's Party	NSi	370	1,132	138	1,231	831	1,993	1,443	494	381	1,397	603	10,013	8.74%	1	0	1
United List of Social Democrats	ZLSD	576	1,119	648	888	1,276	650	938	586	952	459	761	8,853	7.72%	0	1	1
Slovenian National Party	SNS	621	514	452	744	536	556	645	350	2,709	290	407	7,824	6.83%	0	1	1
Active Slovenia	AS	290	363	173	538	257	1,396	1,934	251	286	527	155	6,170	5.38%	0	0	0
Democratic Party of Pensioners of Slovenia	DeSUS	390	995	197	481	582	462	433	371	256	1,193	142	5,502	4.80%	0	1	1
Slovenia is Ours	SN	210	624	11	372	118	127	213	88	77	572	44	2,456	2.14%	0	0	0
Youth Party of Slovenia	SMS	298	280	49	162	203	100	112	50	136	138	132	1,660	1.45%	0	0	0
June List	JL	62	57	57	107	66	116	264	31	44	51	41	896	0.78%	0	0	0
Greens of Slovenia	ZS	45		32	56	59	46	79	29	86	30	35	497	0.43%	0	0	0
Party of Ecological; Movements of Slovenia	SEG	20	56	14	34	27	35	58	21	24	12	25	326	0.28%	0	0	0
List for Enterprising Slovenia	PS	40	55	15	47	29	33	34	11	28	12	21	325	0.28%	0	0	0
Women's Voice of Slovenia, Association for Primorska, Union of Independents of Slovenia and New Democracy of Slovenia	GZS- ZZP- ZNS- NDS	14	28	12	37	37	49	36	18	18	56	18	323	0.28%	0	0	0
Democratic Party of Slovenia	DS	31		10	28	25	39	29	15	9	12	19	217	0.19%	0	0	0
Party of Slovenian People	SSN	27	19	6	30	24	18	26	15	14	19	12	210	0.18%	0	0	0
Štefan Hudobivnik (Independent)	Ind	12	18	7	13	17	33	22	5	8	7	3	145	0.13%	0	0	0
United for an Independent and Just Slovenia		3	15	42	11	4	9	10	5	6	7	4	116	0.10%	0	0	0
Valid votes		10,556	12,406	5,106	12,630	8,588	14,078	15,623	8,657	9,220	8,901	8,851	114,616	100.00%	7	4	11
Rejected votes		255	325	140	276	300	471	380	200	201	233	190	2,971	2.53%			
Total polled		10,811	12,731	5,246	12,906	8,888	14,549	16,003	8,857	9,421	9,134	9,041	117,587	59.94%			
Registered electors		20,101	21,755	8,582	23,024	15,329	24,482	24,718	14,444	14,967	14,799	13,958	196,159				
Turnout		53.78%	58.52%	61.13%	56.05%	57.98%	59.43%	64.74%	61.32%	62.95%	61.72%	64.77%	59.94%				

The following candidates were elected:

- Constituency seats - Kristijan Janc (SLS, Sevnica), 2,403 votes; Miran Jerič (LDS, Hrastnik), 2,280 votes; Stane Pajk (SDS, Krško), 3,580 votes; Bojan Rugelj (SDS, Sevnica), 2,519 votes; Matjaž Švagan (LDS, Zagorje), 4,507 votes; Marjetka Uhan (NSi, Trebnje), 1,397 votes; and Andrej Vizjak (SDS, Brežice), 4,572 votes.
- National seats - Bogdan Barovič (SNS, Trbovlje), 2,709 votes; Aleš Gulič (LDS, Trbovlje), 2,375 votes; Matjaž Han (ZLSD, Laško), 1,276 votes; and Franc Žnidaršič (DeSUS, Trebnje), 1,196 votes.

Substitutions:

- Andrej Vizjak (SDS, Brežice) forfeited his seat on 3 December 2004 upon being elected to the government and was replaced by Ivan Grill (SDS, Novo Mesto 1) on 16 December 2004.
- Kristijan Janc (SLS, Sevnica) died on 3 July 2008 and was replaced by Andrej Fabjan (SLS, Črnomelj-Metlika) on 9 July 2008.

===== 2000 =====
Results of the 2000 parliamentary election held on 15 October 2000:

Party		Votes per electoral district											Total votes	%	Seats		
Party		Brežice	Črnomelj- Metlika	Hrastnik	Krško	Laško	Novo Mesto 1	Novo Mesto 2	Sevnica	Trbovlje	Trebnje	Zagorje	Total votes	%	Con.	Nat.	Tot.
Liberal Democracy of Slovenia	LDS	5,354	4,520	3,190	5,699	3,328	5,856	5,816	2,497	5,609	2,914	7,272	52,055	39.73%	4	1	5
Social Democratic Party of Slovenia	SDSS	2,562	1,324	285	2,068	1,541	2,575	3,058	2,077	1,049	1,313	790	18,642	14.23%	1	1	2
Slovenian People's Party and Slovene Christian Democrats	SLS-SKD	734	4,058	108	2,542	832	2,705	1,806	2,579	282	1,168	495	17,309	13.21%	1	0	1
United List of Social Democrats	ZLSD	895	1,276	1,205	970	1,023	1,435	1,301	953	1,350	616	637	11,661	8.90%	1	0	1
New Slovenia – Christian People's Party	NSi	445	1,265	118	1,311	753	1,588	1,660	439	342	1,617	687	10,225	7.80%	0	1	1
Democratic Party of Pensioners of Slovenia	DeSUS	913	1,088	296	369	726	924	833	326	456	1,150	180	7,261	5.54%	0	0	0
Slovenian National Party	SNS	530	578	402	626	868	583	540	243	1,174	202	259	6,005	4.58%	0	1	1
Youth Party of Slovenia	SMS	323	297	206	471	465	606	909	285	467	366	182	4,577	3.49%	0	0	0
Greens of Slovenia	ZS	49	78	67	87	161	134	163	32	45	43	28	887	0.68%	0	0	0
Democratic Party of Slovenia	DS	120	260	19	44	63	73	96	23	18	127	22	865	0.66%	0	0	0
New Party	NS	56	72	45	52	38	100	101	27	36	62	30	619	0.47%	0	0	0
Forward Slovenia	NPS	167	31	17	74	44	44	60	18	33	17	16	521	0.40%	0	0	0
Party of Democratic Action of Slovenia	SDAS	34	29	74	19	8	25	40	15	108	0	42	394	0.30%	0	0	0
Valid votes		12,182	14,876	6,032	14,332	9,850	16,648	16,383	9,514	10,969	9,595	10,640	131,021	100.00%	7	4	11
Rejected votes		348	528	175	461	444	635	657	294	214	437	252	4,445	3.28%			
Total polled		12,530	15,404	6,207	14,793	10,294	17,283	17,040	9,808	11,183	10,032	10,892	135,466	71.03%			
Registered electors		19,597	21,032	8,371	22,369	15,061	23,471	23,295	15,040	14,875	14,014	13,588	190,713				
Turnout		63.94%	73.24%	74.15%	66.13%	68.35%	73.64%	73.15%	65.21%	75.18%	71.59%	80.16%	71.03%				

The following candidates were elected:

- Constituency seats - Jože Avšič (LDS); Andrej Fabjan (SLS-SKD); Zoran Gračner (LDS); Leopold Grošelj (ZLSD); Miran Jerič (LDS); Branko Kelemina (SDSS); and Matjaž Švagan (LDS).
- National seats - Bogdan Barovič (SNS); Branko Janc (LDS); Lojze Peterle (NSi); and Andrej Vizjak (SDSS).

Substitutions:

- Lojze Peterle (NSi) forfeited his seat on 1 July 2004 upon being elected to the European Parliament and was replaced by Matjaž Falkner (NSi) on 22 July 2004.

==== 1990s ====
===== 1996 =====
Results of the 1996 parliamentary election held on 10 November 1996:

Party		Votes per electoral district											Total votes	%	Seats		
Party		Brežice	Črnomelj- Metlika	Hrastnik	Krško	Laško	Novo Mesto 1	Novo Mesto 2	Sevnica	Trbovlje	Trebnje	Zagorje	Total votes	%	Con.	Nat.	Tot.
Liberal Democracy of Slovenia	LDS	3,824	2,780	2,529	4,280	2,213	3,681	4,179	1,832	5,187	2,764	6,322	39,591	30.54%	3	1	4
Slovenian People's Party	SLS	2,092	4,116	533	2,662	2,887	4,296	3,159	2,189	881	2,468	1,326	26,609	20.53%	2	0	2
Social Democratic Party of Slovenia	SDSS	1,622	1,871	437	2,190	1,292	2,412	2,863	2,157	951	970	692	17,457	13.47%	1	1	2
Slovene Christian Democrats	SKD	700	1,379	385	1,886	841	1,750	2,238	1,071	554	1,753	735	13,292	10.25%	1	0	1
United List of Social Democrats	ZLSD	993	1,789	1,376	914	1,186	1,054	1,118	913	1,734	383	502	11,962	9.23%	1	0	1
Slovenian National Party	SNS	348	497	384	393	237	793	707	238	394	244	191	4,426	3.41%	0	0	0
Democratic Party of Pensioners of Slovenia	DeSUS	111	1,164	131	278	210	585	552	202	169	806	103	4,311	3.33%	0	1	1
Democratic Party of Slovenia	DS	1,442	189	82	309	170	408	313	130	107	80	127	3,357	2.59%	0	0	0
Greens of Slovenia	ZS	98	184	97	154	237	322	323	105	205	85	125	1,935	1.49%	0	0	0
Slovenian Craftsmen and Entrepreneurial; Party and Centrum Party	SOPS	142	139	30	131	133	271	292	179	70	81	48	1,516	1.17%	0	0	0
Dragomir Ficko (Independent)	Ind	497	116	0	263	80	172	176	85	0	56	0	1,445	1.11%	0	0	0
Christian Social Union	KSU	34	173	17	58	36	205	123	42	17	37	20	762	0.59%	0	0	0
Liberal Party	LS	39	68	39	27	71	63	85	98	26	29	32	577	0.45%	0	0	0
Slovenian Forum	SF	79	13	20	165	36	74	73	11	43	11	8	533	0.41%	0	0	0
Green Alternative of Slovenia	ZA	25	58	25	78	48	54	50	54	42	43	35	512	0.39%	0	0	0
National Labour Party	NSD	27	46	20	57	30	61	60	43	45	28	22	439	0.34%	0	0	0
Republican Association of Slovenia	RZS	16	38	13	48	49	67	63	31	23	21	15	384	0.30%	0	0	0
Slovenian National Right	SND	27	35	16	47	36	42	49	32	32	15	12	343	0.26%	0	0	0
Party for the Equality of Regions	SED	8	17	15	18	19	33	29	9	9	11	6	174	0.13%	0	0	0
Valid votes		12,124	14,672	6,149	13,958	9,811	16,343	16,452	9,421	10,489	9,885	10,321	129,625	100.00%	8	3	11
Rejected votes													8,774	6.34%			
Total polled													138,399	74.81%			
Registered electors													184,992				
Turnout													74.81%				

The following candidates were elected:

- Constituency seats - Jože Avšič (LDS); Janez Drnovšek (LDS); Andrej Fabjan (SLS); Peter Hrastelj (SLS); Miran Jerič (LDS); Branko Kelemina (SDSS); Lojze Peterle (SKD); and Miran Potrč (ZLSD).
- National seats - Branko Janc (LDS); Janez Mežan; and Franc Žnidaršič (DeSUS).

Substitutions:

- Janez Drnovšek (LDS) forfeited his seat on 9 January 1997 upon being elected Prime Minister and was replaced by Ciril Metod Pungartnik (LDS) on 16 January 1997.
- Ciril Metod Pungartnik (LDS) forfeited his seat on 7 June 2000 when Janez Drnovšek (LDS) lost his government position, regaining his seat.
- Janez Drnovšek (LDS) resigned on 13 June 2000 and was replaced by Ciril Metod Pungartnik (LDS) on 20 June 2000.
- Lojze Peterle (SKD) forfeited his seat on 7 June 2000 upon being elected to the government and was replaced by Vida Čadonič Špelič (SKD) on 20 June 2000.

===== 1992 =====
Results of the 1992 parliamentary election held on 6 December 1992:

Party		Votes	%	Seats		
Party		Votes	%	Con.	Nat.	Tot.
Liberal Democracy of Slovenia	LDS	39,147	27.02%	2	1	3
Slovene Christian Democrats	SKD	22,186	15.32%	1	1	2
United List	ZL	19,341	13.35%	1	1	2
Slovenian People's Party	SLS	13,648	9.42%	1	0	1
Slovenian National Party	SNS	12,668	8.74%	0	1	1
Socialist Party of Slovenia	SSS	6,787	4.69%	0	0	0
Democratic Party of Slovenia	DS	6,057	4.18%	0	0	0
Greens of Slovenia	ZS	4,473	3.09%	0	0	0
National Democratic Party and Slovenian Party	ND-SGS	4,192	2.89%	0	0	0
Social Democratic Party of Slovenia	SDSS	3,098	2.14%	0	0	0
Slovenian Craftsmen and Entrepreneurial; Party and Centrum Party	SOPS	2,361	1.63%	0	0	0
Christian Socialists, DS Forward and Free Party	KS-DS	2,095	1.45%	0	0	0
Independent Party	SN	1,594	1.10%	0	0	0
Liberal Party	LS	1,349	0.93%	0	0	0
Independent	Ind	1,329	0.92%	0	0	0
Liberal Democratic Party of Slovenia	LDSS	1,182	0.82%	0	0	0
Slovenian Ecological Movement	SEG	832	0.57%	0	0	0
DEMOS	DEMOS	798	0.55%	0	0	0
“SMER" Association of Slovenia	SMER	657	0.45%	0	0	0
Republican Association of Slovenia	RZS	547	0.38%	0	0	0
Movement for General Democracy	GOD	520	0.36%	0	0	0
Valid votes		144,861	100.00%	5	4	9
Rejected votes		10,952	7.03%			
Total polled		155,813	86.36%			
Registered electors		180,415				

The following candidates were elected:

- Constituency seats - Janez Drnovšek (LDS); Miran Jerič (LDS); Alojzij Metelko (SLS); Lojze Peterle (SKD); and Miran Potrč (ZL).
- National seats - Franc Černelič (SKD); Branko Janc (LDS); Rafael Kužnik (SNS); and Franc Lipoglavšek (ZL).

Substitutions:

- Janez Drnovšek (LDS) forfeited his seat on 12 January 1993 upon being elected Prime Minister and was replaced by Marjan Šetinc (LDS) on 23 February 1993.
- Lojze Peterle (SKD) forfeited his seat on 25 January 1993 upon being elected to the government and was replaced by Vida Čadonič Špelič (SKD) on 23 February 1993.
