= Cerovec =

Cerovec may refer to the following places in Slovenia:

- Cerovec, Dolenjske Toplice, a village in the Municipality of Dolenjske Toplice
- Cerovec, Šentjur, a village in the Municipality of Šentjur
- Cerovec, Sevnica, a village in the Municipality of Sevnica
- Cerovec pod Bočem, a village in the Municipality of Rogaška Slatina
- Cerovec pri Črešnjevcu, a village in the Municipality of Semič
- Cerovec pri Trebelnem, a village in the Municipality of Mokronog-Trebelno
- Cerovec Stanka Vraza, a village in the Municipality of Ormož
- Mali Cerovec, a village in the Municipality of Novo Mesto
- Veliki Cerovec, a village in the Municipality of Novo Mesto
