= Marcel Lorber =

Slovenian footballer (born 2004)

Personal information
- Date of birth: 26 April 2004 (age 22)
- Place of birth: Maribor, Slovenia
- Height: 1.82 m (6 ft 0 in)
- Position: Midfielder

Team information
- Current team: Lokomotiva Zagreb
- Number: 14

Youth career
- –2018: Rogaška
- 2018–2021: Aluminij
- 2021–2023: Maribor

Senior career*
Years	Team	Apps	(Gls)
2023–2024	Maribor	32	(2)
2024–2025	Domžale	31	(2)
2025–	Lokomotiva Zagreb	10	(0)

International career
2021–2022	Slovenia U18	9	(0)
2022–2023	Slovenia U19	12	(0)
2023	Slovenia U21	1	(0)
- * Club domestic league appearances and goals as of 15 June 2026

Marcel Lorber (born 26 April 2004) is a Slovenian footballer who plays as a midfielder for Croatian Football League club Lokomotiva Zagreb.

== Club career ==
Born in Maribor, Lorber spent his youth in Cerovec pod Bočem in the Municipality of Rogaška Slatina, and started his football career at local club Rogaška. At the age of 14, he moved to Aluminij, before joining Maribor in 2021. After initially spending two years playing for Maribor's under-19 team, he made his senior debut with the "Purples" in a Slovenian Cup round of 16 match against Rudar Velenje on 8 March 2023, which Maribor won 4–0. He scored his first senior goal against Mura on 7 October 2023, helping his team to a 3–1 victory.

Lorber had a breakthrough season in 2023–24, making 26 appearances in all competitions in the first half of the season, although his season was cut short by injury in January. He ended the season with 37 appearances as Maribor finished as the league's runners-up, behind Celje.

He joined Slovenian top division club Domžale on a free transfer in September 2024, and made his debut for the club in the same month in a goalless draw against Bravo.

== International career ==
Lorber was a Slovenia youth international and represented the country at the under-18, under-19 and under-21 level.

== Personal life ==
In an interview, Lorber stated that he has been a fan of Maribor since childhood and always wanted to play for the club. He has two younger brothers, Žan and Anej, who are also footballers.
