= Cerovec pri Šmarju =

- Location in Slovenia
- Coordinates: 46°12′51.33″N 15°30′30.91″E
- Country: Slovenia
- Traditional region: Styria
- Statistical region: Savinja
- Municipality: Šmarje pri Jelšah

Area
  - Total: 4.42 km^{2} (1.71 sq mi)
- Elevation: 346.3 m (1,136 ft)

Population (2002)
  - Total: 118

Cerovec pri Šmarju (pronounced [tsɛˈɾɔːʋəts pɾi ˈʃmaːɾju]) is a dispersed settlement in the Municipality of Šmarje pri Jelšah in eastern Slovenia. It lies in the Kozje region (Slovene: Kozjansko) in the hills to the south of Šmarje pri Jelšah. The area is part of the traditional region of Styria. The municipality is now included in the Savinja Statistical Region.

== Name ==
Like other settlements that share the common name Cerovec (e.g., Cerovec pri Črešnjevcu, Cerovec pod Bočem, Veliki Cerovec, etc.), the name is derived from the Slovene common noun cer 'Turkey oak' and originally refers to the local vegetation. The name of the settlement was changed from Cerovec to Cerovec pri Šmarju (literally, 'Cerovec near Šmarje') in 1955.

== Mass graves ==
Cerovec pri Šmarju is the site of two mass graves from the period immediately after the Second World War. They both contain the remains of an unknown number of local Slovene civilians from the Šmarje pri Jelšah area that were murdered after the war. The Kolen Cave Mass Grave (Slovene: Grobišče Kolen jama) is located on the northeast edge of a meadow next to the woods, 290 m north of the road from Šmarje pri Jelšah, near the Mlinarič farm (Kamenik no. 8). The Pond Mass Grave (Grobišče na ribniku) is located in a meadow that was turned into a pond after the war.
