= Mali Cerovec =

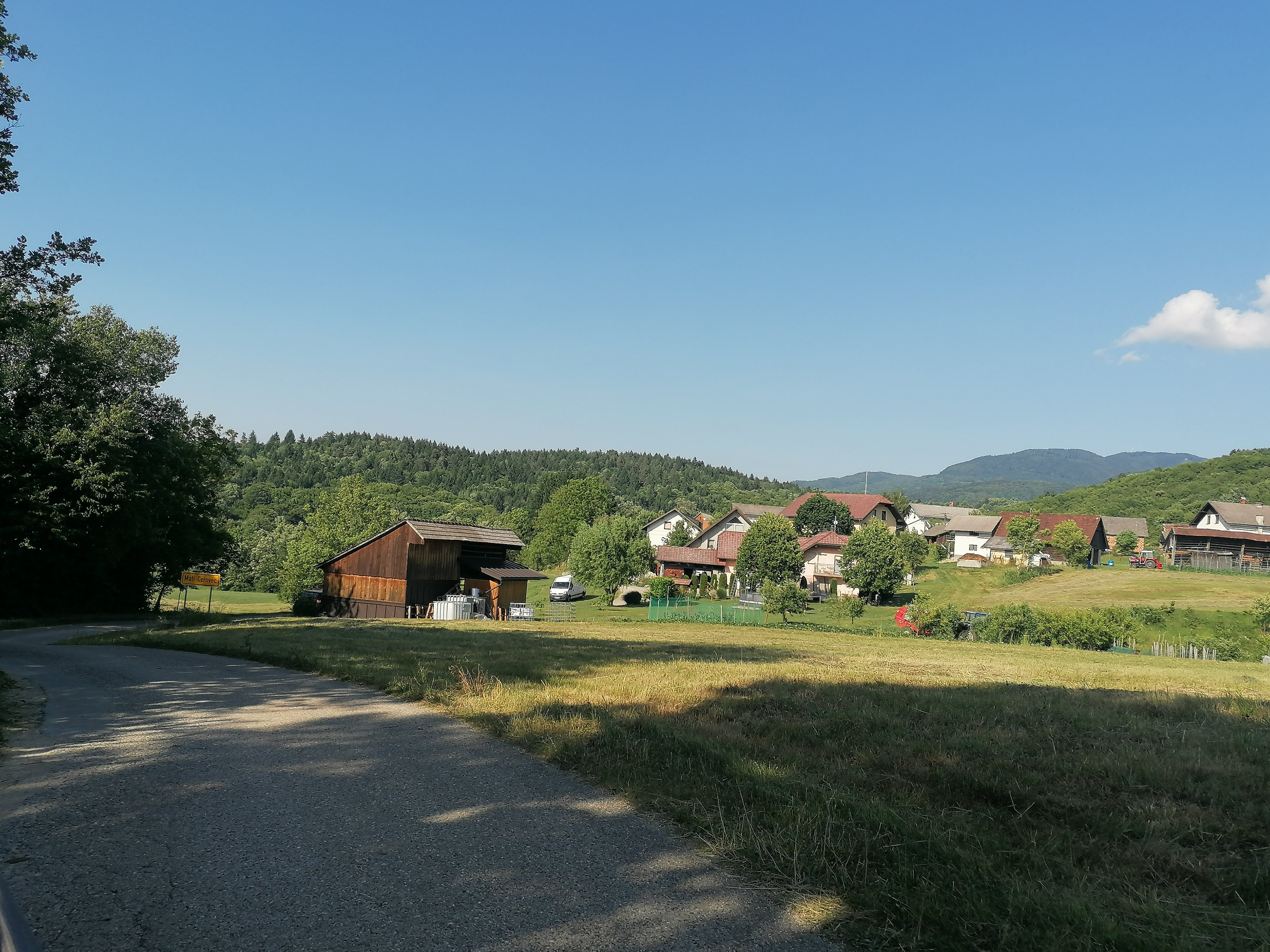

- Location in Slovenia
- Coordinates: 45°45′1.57″N 15°13′32.93″E
- Country: Slovenia
- Traditional region: Lower Carniola
- Statistical region: Southeast Slovenia
- Municipality: Novo Mesto

Area
  - Total: 1.926 km^{2} (0.744 sq mi)
- Elevation: 332.6 m (1,091 ft)

Population (2026)
  - Total: 22
- Postal code: 8000

Mali Cerovec (pronounced [ˈmaːli tsɛˈɾɔːʋəts]) is a settlement in the foothills of the Gorjanci range in the City Municipality of Novo Mesto in southeastern Slovenia. The area is part of the traditional region of Lower Carniola and is now included in the Southeast Slovenia Statistical Region. In January 2026, the population was 22.

== Name ==
The name Mali Cerovec literally means 'little Cerovec', contrasting with neighboring Veliki Cerovec (lit. 'big Cerovec'), which has a population about six times larger. Like other settlements that share the common name Cerovec (e.g., Cerovec pod Bočem, Cerovec pri Črešnjevcu, Cerovec pri Šmarju, etc.), the name is derived from the Slovene common noun cer 'Turkey oak' and originally refers to the local vegetation.
