= Veliki Cerovec =

- Location in Slovenia
- Coordinates: 45°44′37.23″N 15°13′54.58″E
- Country: Slovenia
- Traditional region: Lower Carniola
- Statistical region: Southeast Slovenia
- Municipality: Novo Mesto

Area
  - Total: 1.727 km^{2} (0.667 sq mi)
- Elevation: 463.8 m (1,522 ft)

Population (2026)
  - Total: 122
  - Density: 71/km^{2} (180/sq mi)
- Postal code: 8000

Veliki Cerovec (pronounced [ˈʋeːliki tsɛˈɾɔːʋəts] or [ˈʋeːliki tsɛˈɾoːʋəts]) is a settlement in the Gorjanci Mountains in the Municipality of Novo Mesto in southeastern Slovenia. The area is part of the traditional region of Lower Carniola and is now included in the Southeast Slovenia Statistical Region. In January 2026, the population was 122.

== Name ==
The name Veliki Cerovec literally means 'big Cerovec', contrasting with neighboring Mali Cerovec (lit. 'little Cerovec'), which has about one-sixth that of the population of the larger settlement. Like other settlements that share the common name Cerovec (e.g., Cerovec pod Bočem, Cerovec pri Črešnjevcu, Cerovec pri Šmarju, etc.), the name is derived from the Slovene common noun cer 'Turkey oak' and originally refers to the local vegetation.

== Church ==
The local church is dedicated to Saints Primus and Felician and belongs to the Parish of Stopiče. It was a medieval building that was extensively restyled in the Baroque style in the 18th century.
