= Stope =

Stope may refer to:

- Stope, Velike Lašče, a settlement in central Slovenia
- Stope, an underground space produced by stoping (mining)

Stopes may also refer to:

- Henry Stopes (1852–1902), English brewer
- Marie Stopes (1880–1958), Scottish palaeobotanist and pioneer in the field of family planning

== See also ==
- Stoping (geology)
