= Travni Dol =

- Location in Slovenia
- Coordinates: 45°42′0.77″N 15°6′59.25″E
- Country: Slovenia
- Traditional region: Lower Carniola
- Statistical region: Southeast Slovenia
- Municipality: Novo Mesto

Area
  - Total: 2.851 km^{2} (1.101 sq mi)
- Elevation: 401 m (1,316 ft)

Population (2026)
  - Total: 11
  - Density: 4/km^{2} (10/sq mi)
- Postal code: 8000

Travni Dol (pronounced [ˈtɾaːu̯ni ˈdoːu̯]; German: Drandul, also Drandol, Gottscheerish: Trandul) is a small settlement in the hills south of Novo Mesto in southeastern Slovenia. The area is part of the traditional region of Lower Carniola and is now included in the Southeast Slovenia Statistical Region. In January 2026, the population was 11.

== Name ==
The Slovene name Travni Dol literally means 'grassy valley'. The German name Drandul (or Drandol) and the Gottscheerish name Trandul are approximations of the Slovene name. The name of the settlement was also recorded as Traundul in the land registry of 1574 and in 1881. The name Travni Dol and names like it (e.g., Trava) are derived from the Slovene common noun trava 'grass'.

== History ==
Travni Dol was listed in the land registry of 1574 but no information on the number of houses or inhabitants was provided. It was not listed at all in the 1770 census and may have been overlooked. In 1937 the village had 12 houses and a population of 37. The villagers farmed for their own needs and also exported wood to Zagreb via Uršna Sela. During the Second World War, Italian forces burned six houses in the village. They were not rebuilt after the war. A reunion of Gottschee Germans was held in Travni Dol on 19 and 20 June 1999, attended by Slovene and Austrian government representatives.
