= Zajčji Vrh pri Stopičah =

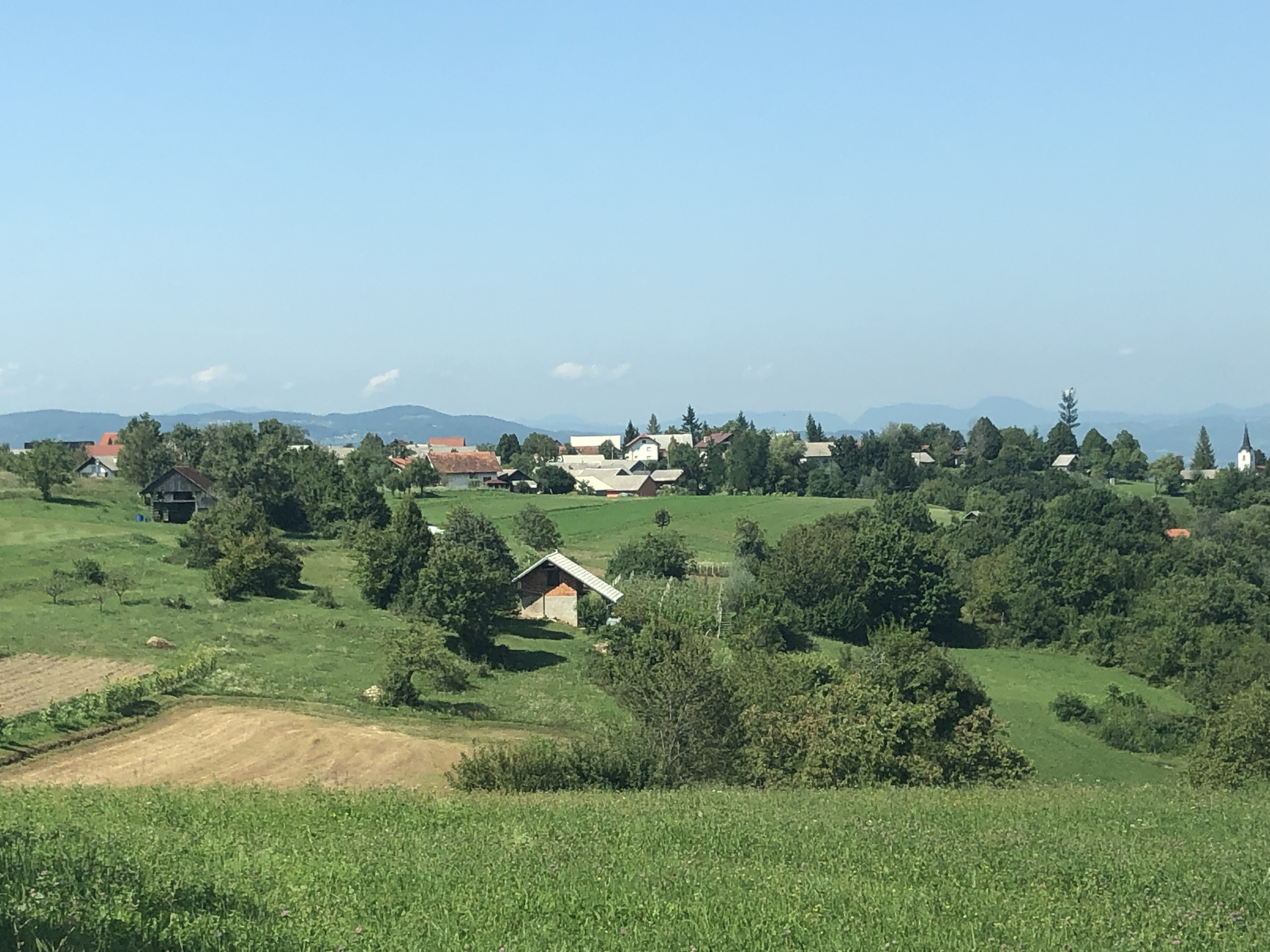

- Location in Slovenia
- Coordinates: 45°46′19.2″N 15°14′29.72″E
- Country: Slovenia
- Traditional region: Lower Carniola
- Statistical region: Southeast Slovenia
- Municipality: Novo Mesto

Area
  - Total: 0.886 km^{2} (0.342 sq mi)
- Elevation: 393.5 m (1,291 ft)

Population (2026)
  - Total: 102
  - Density: 115/km^{2} (300/sq mi)
- Postal code: 8000

Zajčji Vrh pri Stopičah (pronounced [ˈzaːi̯tʃji ˈʋəɾx pɾi ˈstoːpitʃax]; in older sources also Zajč Vrh, German: Hasenberg) is a settlement in the foothills of the Gorjanci range in the City Municipality of Novo Mesto in southeastern Slovenia. The area is part of the traditional region of Lower Carniola and is now included in the Southeast Slovenia Statistical Region. In January 2026, the population was 102.

== Name ==
The name of the settlement was changed from Zajčji Vrh to Zajčji Vrh pri Stopičah in 1955.

== Church ==
The local church is dedicated to Saint Matthias and belongs to the Parish of Stopiče. It was built in the late 17th century.
