= Mali Slatnik =

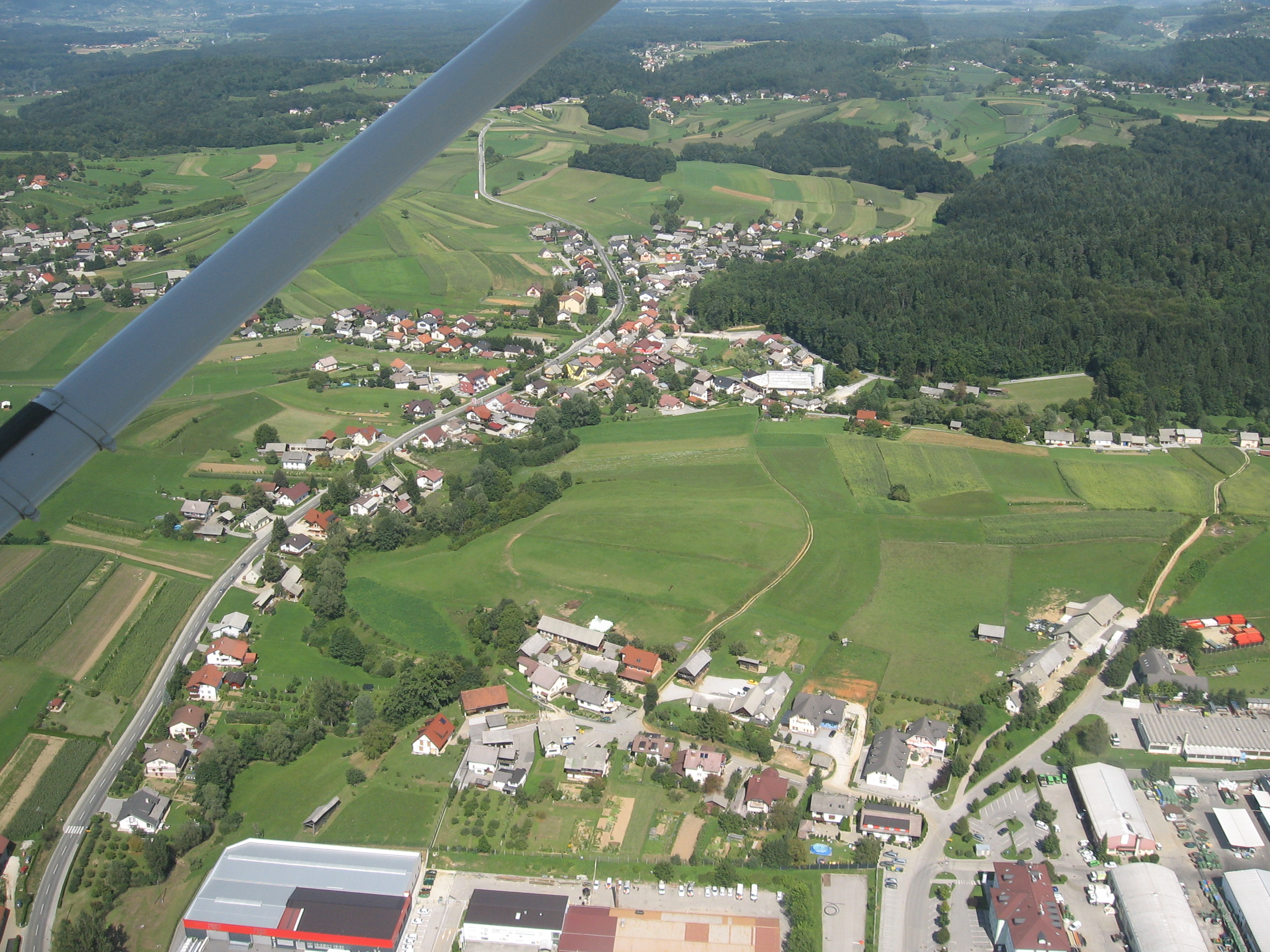

- Location in Slovenia
- Coordinates: 45°48′36.14″N 15°12′28.5″E
- Country: Slovenia
- Traditional region: Lower Carniola
- Statistical region: Southeast Slovenia
- Municipality: Novo Mesto

Area
  - Total: 1.696 km^{2} (0.655 sq mi)
- Elevation: 190.2 m (624 ft)

Population (2026)
  - Total: 264
  - Density: 156/km^{2} (400/sq mi)
- Postal code: 8000

Mali Slatnik (pronounced [ˈmaːli ˈslaːtnik], in older sources also Mali Slatenek, German: Kleinslatenegg) is a settlement in the hills east of Novo Mesto in southeastern Slovenia. The area is part of the traditional region of Lower Carniola and is now included in the Southeast Slovenia Statistical Region. In January 2026, the population was 264.

== Geography ==
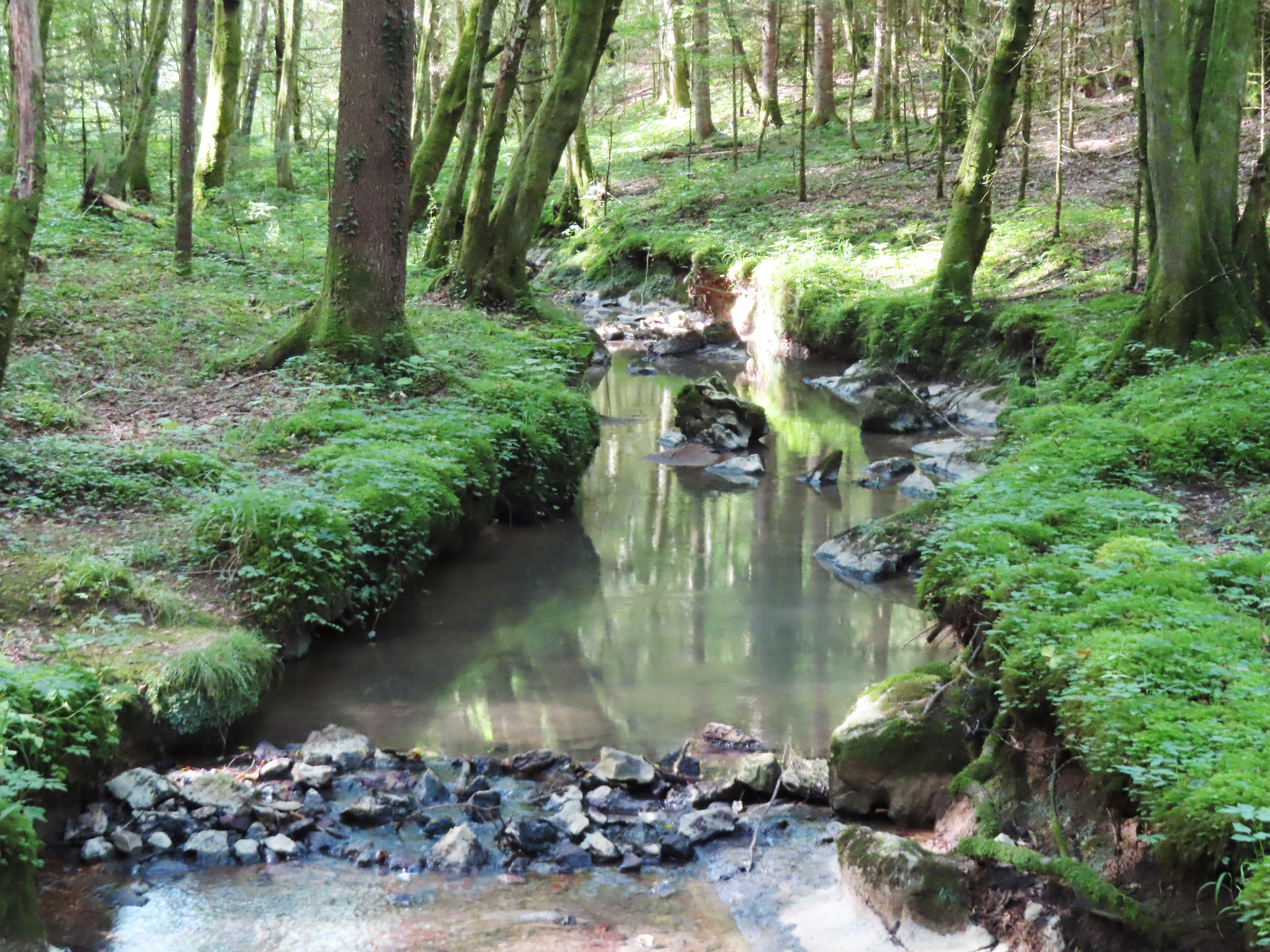
Bajer Creek

Mali Slatnik is a clustered village in a level area on both sides of the road from Novo Mesto to Kostanjevica na Krki. The area has many springs, which flow into Bajer Creek, also known as Slatnik Creek (Slatenski potok) and Šajser or Šajsar (from German Scheißer Bach). The most powerful spring is Slatnik Spring (Slatenski studenec), which was used as a source of drinking water.

== History ==
In 1866, Johann Mach (1805–1879; the father of the physicist Ernst Mach), who lived in the neighboring village of Veliki Slatnik, started cultivating Japanese silkmoths in the oak forest on Mach Hill (Machov hrib, elevation: 262 meters or 860 feet) south of Mali Slatnik. Some of these farmed silkmoths eventually escaped, resulting in the presence of this species in Slovenia today.

Schooling was established in Mali Slatnik in 1913, and a schoolhouse started operating in 1935. During the Second World War, Partisan forces attacked an Italian post set up in the schoolhouse, burning it. The schoolhouse was rebuilt and expanded after the war.

Two mills formerly operated along Bajer Creek. The building of the Tiček Mill (Tičkov mlin) is still preserved, and it was supplied by a millrace 500 meters (1,600 ft) long. Both mills were abandoned by 1971.
