= Uršna Sela railway station =

Railway station in City Municipality of Novo Mesto, Slovenia

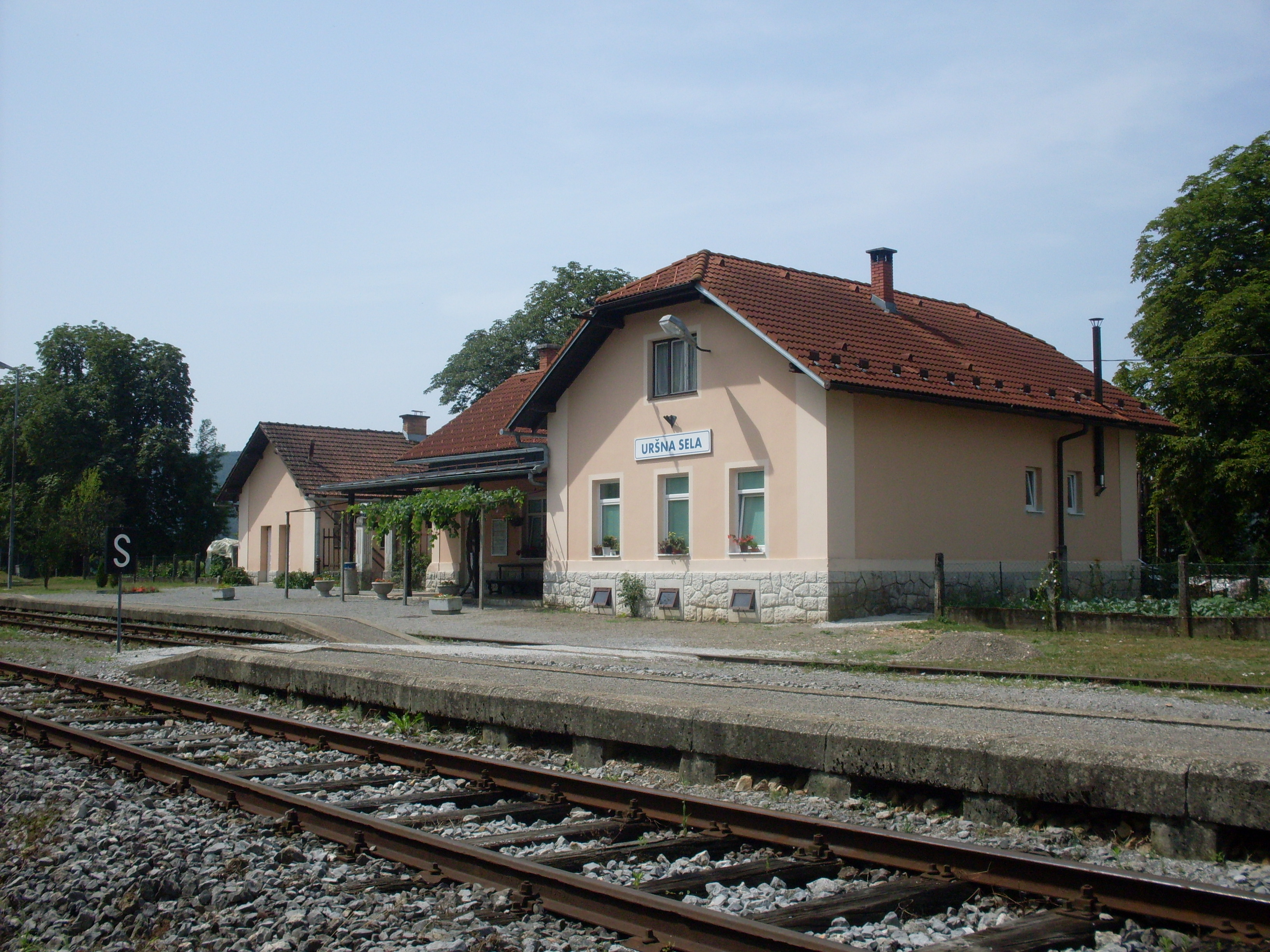

General information
- Location: 8323 Uršna Sela, Novo Mesto; Slovenia
- Coordinates: 45°42′52.29″N 15°7′39.63″E
- Owner: Slovenian Railways
- Operator: Slovenian Railways
Location
- Location within Slovenia

The Uršna Sela railway station (Slovene: Železniška postaja Uršna sela) is the principal railway station in Uršna Sela, Slovenia.
