= Vinja Vas =

- Location in Slovenia
- Coordinates: 45°44′18.26″N 15°12′42.33″E
- Country: Slovenia
- Traditional region: Lower Carniola
- Statistical region: Southeast Slovenia
- Municipality: Novo Mesto

Area
  - Total: 4.791 km^{2} (1.850 sq mi)
- Elevation: 433.2 m (1,421 ft)

Population (2026)
  - Total: 113
  - Density: 24/km^{2} (62/sq mi)
- Postal code: 8000

Vinja Vas (pronounced [ˈʋiːnja ˈʋaːs]; Slovene: Vinja vas) is a settlement in the Gorjanci Mountains in the City Municipality of Novo Mesto in southeastern Slovenia. The area is part of the traditional region of Lower Carniola and is now included in the Southeast Slovenia Statistical Region. In January 2026, the population was 113.

A small chapel with a belfry in the western part of the settlement is dedicated to Mary Help of Christians and belongs to the Parish of Podgrad. It was built in 1905 in a Neo-Romanesque style.
