= Jurna Vas =

- Location in Slovenia
- Coordinates: 45°44′48.88″N 15°11′5.75″E
- Country: Slovenia
- Traditional region: Lower Carniola
- Statistical region: Southeast Slovenia
- Municipality: Novo Mesto

Area
  - Total: 1.561 km^{2} (0.603 sq mi)
- Elevation: 268.8 m (882 ft)

Population (2026)
  - Total: 130
  - Density: 83/km^{2} (210/sq mi)
- Postal code: 8000

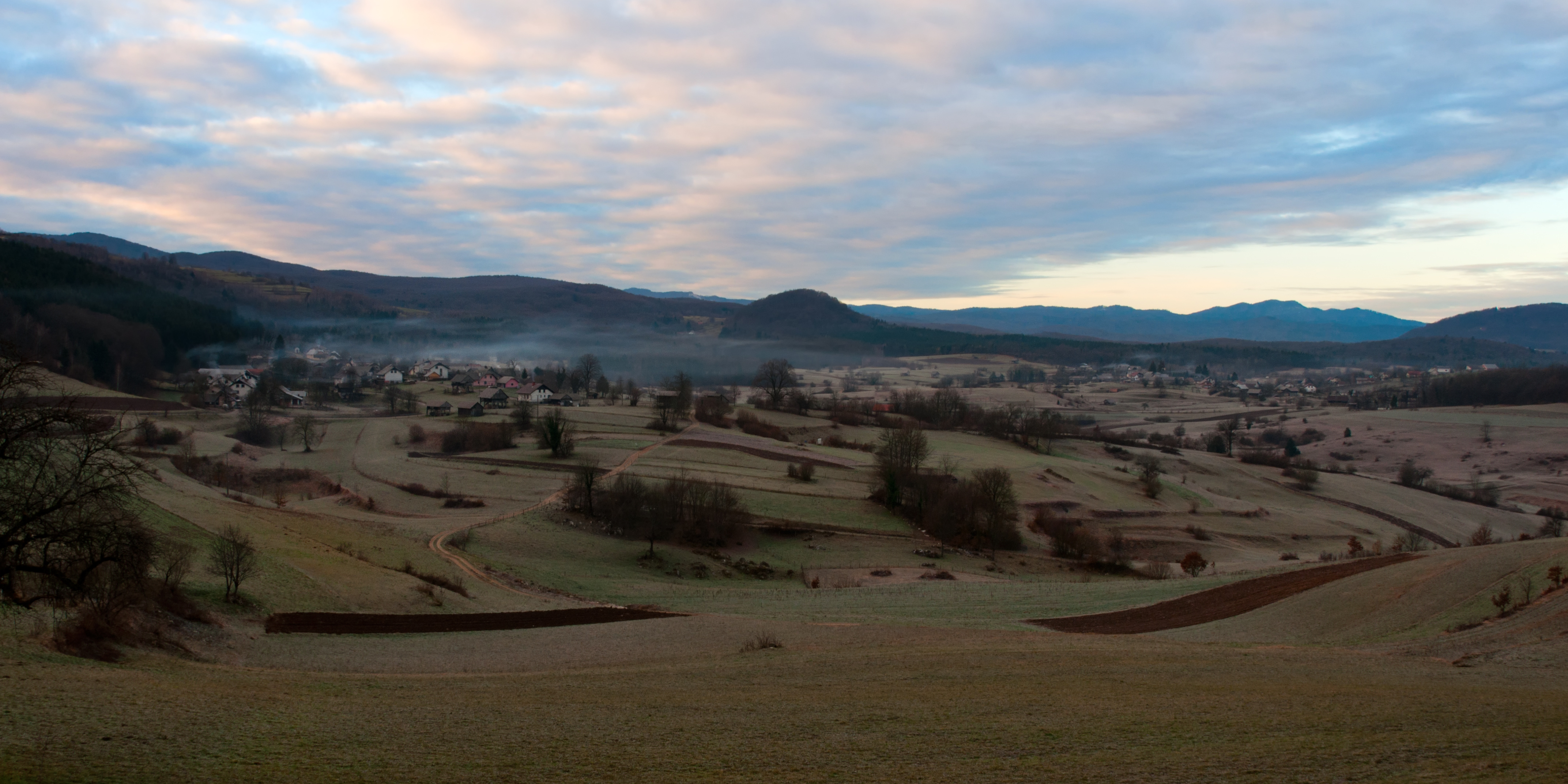
Koroška vas (left) and Jurna vas (right).

Jurna Vas (pronounced [ˈjuːɾna ˈʋaːs]; Slovene: Jurna vas) is a settlement in the hills south of Novo Mesto in southeastern Slovenia. The area is part of the traditional region of Lower Carniola and is now included in the Southeast Slovenia Statistical Region. In January 2026, the population was 130.

The local church, built on the southern outskirts of the village, is dedicated to Saint Margaret (Slovene: sveta Marjeta) and belongs to the Parish of Podgrad. It was built in the early 18th century.
