= Stopče =

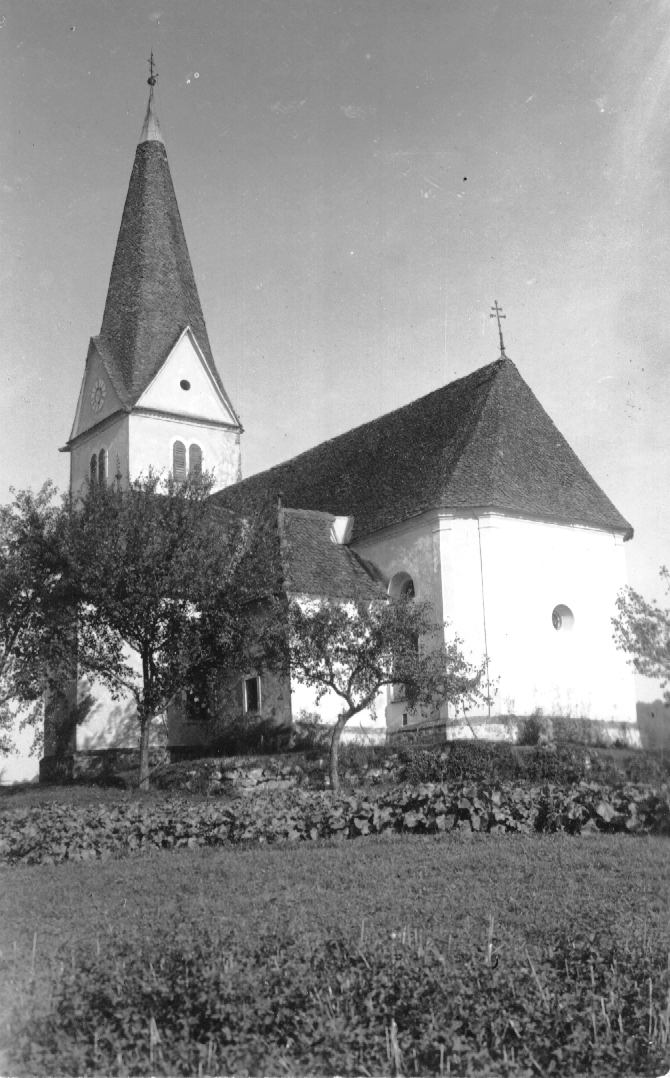

- Location in Slovenia
- Coordinates: 46°12′55.49″N 15°25′27.66″E
- Country: Slovenia
- Traditional region: Styria
- Statistical region: Savinja
- Municipality: Šentjur

Area
  - Total: 0.99 km^{2} (0.38 sq mi)
- Elevation: 272.8 m (895 ft)

Population (2020)
  - Total: 244
  - Density: 250/km^{2} (640/sq mi)

Stopče (pronounced [ˈstoːptʃɛ]) is a village in the Municipality of Šentjur in eastern Slovenia. It lies on the regional road leading east from the town of Šentjur to Grobelno. The settlement, and the entire municipality, are included in the Savinja Statistical Region, which is in the Slovenian portion of the historical Duchy of Styria.

The local church is dedicated to Saint Acacius (Slovene: sveti Ahac) and belongs to the Parish of Šentjur. It dates to 17th century and was extended and vaulted in 1777.
