= Stopiče =

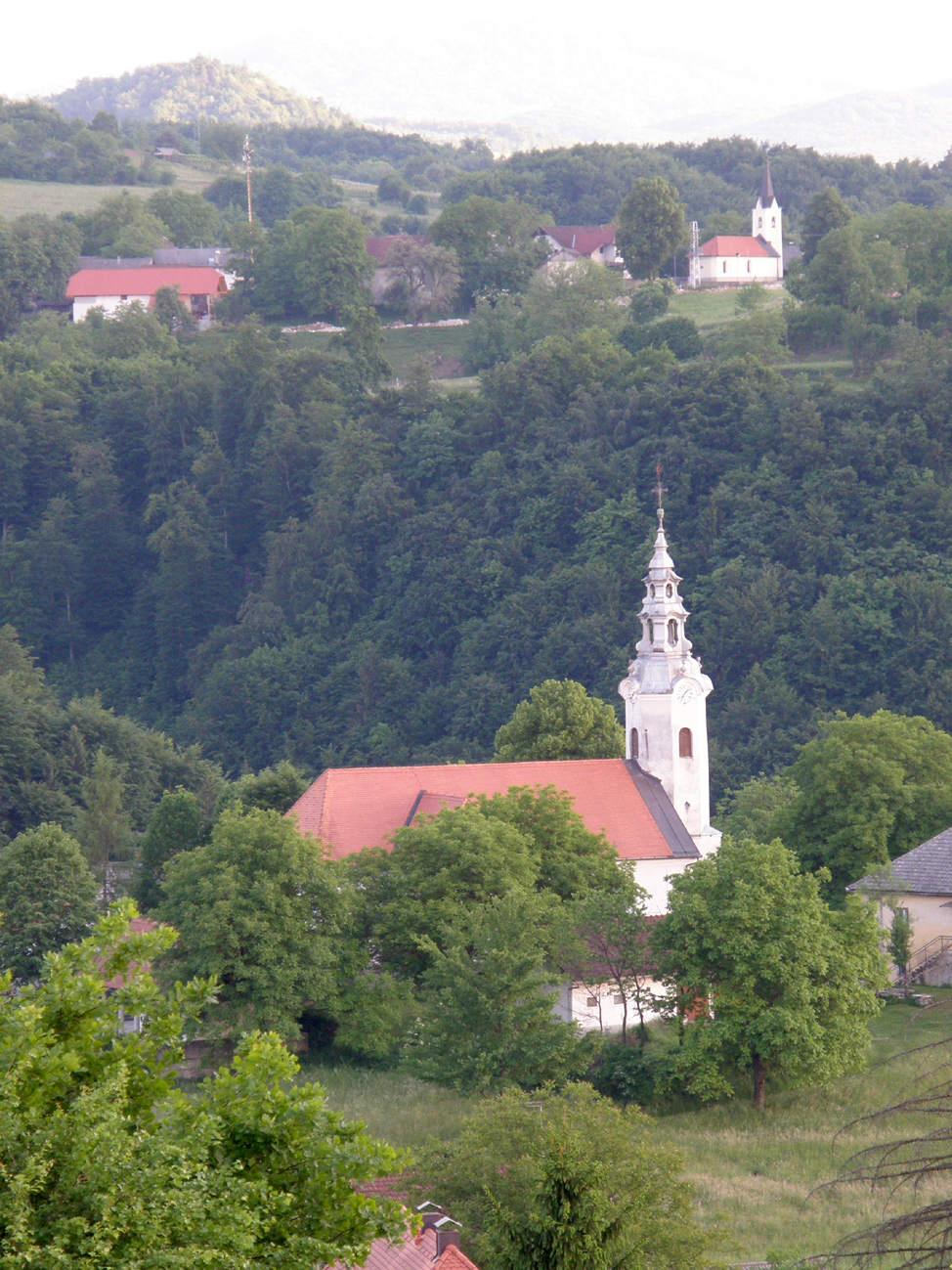
- Our Lady Comforter of the Afflicted Church in Stopiče. In the background, Gornja Težka Voda.

- Location in Slovenia
- Coordinates: 45°46′11.04″N 15°12′17.77″E
- Country: Slovenia
- Traditional region: Lower Carniola
- Statistical region: Southeast Slovenia
- Municipality: Novo Mesto

Area
  - Total: 1.128 km^{2} (0.436 sq mi)
- Elevation: 231.8 m (760 ft)

Population (2026)
  - Total: 466
  - Density: 413/km^{2} (1,070/sq mi)
- Postal code: 8322

Stopiče (pronounced [ˈstóːpitʃɛ]; German: Stopitsch) is a village in the foothills of the Gorjanci range in the City Municipality of Novo Mesto, in southeastern Slovenia. The area is part of the traditional region of Lower Carniola and is now included in the Southeast Slovenia Statistical Region. In January 2026, the population was 466.

== Name ==
The name Stopiče, like related place names (e.g., Stopče, Stope), is probably derived from the Slovene common noun stopa 'stamp mill', used for hulling grain. In the past the German name was Stopitsch.

== History ==
A part-time school was set up in Stopiče in 1846, and a regular school was established in 1852 in the rectory. A schoolhouse was built in 1902. The schoolhouse was burned during the Second World War, and a new one was built in 1954. During the Second World War, a MVAC headquarters was set up in Stopiče in September 1942. It carried out summary executions of Partisan prisoners. The headquarters was transferred to Novo Mesto following a Partisan attack on 26 and 27 November 1942.

== Church ==
The local parish church in the settlement is dedicated to Our Lady Comforter of the Afflicted and belongs to the Roman Catholic Diocese of Novo Mesto. It was built in 1708 on the site of a medieval church. The earliest attested church at the site was mentioned in written sources in the 15th century. The current structure was commissioned by Baron Johann Lorenz Paradeiser in 1704. It contains three altars with richly carved frames. The crests of the Paradeiser and Attems families are displayed above the main altar. The paintings on the side altars are 1857 works by Michael Stroy. The Lenten painting (used to cover church furnishings during Lent) from the end of the 18th century is the work of Anton Postl. Stopiče was elevated to a parish in 1767. There is a chapel dedicated to the Rosary above the village, indicating that there was once a pilgrimage route here.

== Notable people ==
Notable people that were born or lived in Stopiče include:

- Anton Pekec (1803–1833), religious writer
- Anton Umek (1827–1882), journalist
