= Gornja Težka Voda =

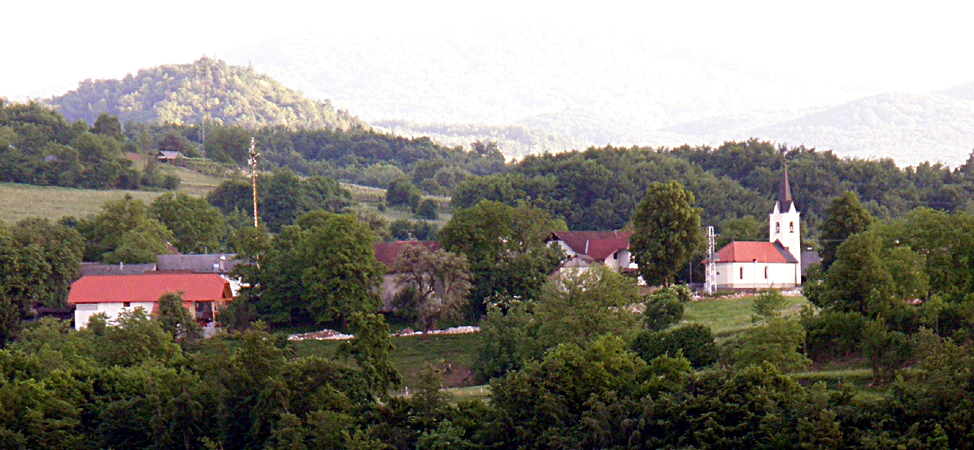
- Gornja Težka Voda with St. Urban's Church (view from Verdun)

- Location in Slovenia
- Coordinates: 45°45′50.3″N 15°12′21.86″E
- Country: Slovenia
- Traditional region: Lower Carniola
- Statistical region: Southeast Slovenia
- Municipality: Novo Mesto

Area
  - Total: 2.175 km^{2} (0.840 sq mi)
- Elevation: 285.8 m (938 ft)

Population (2026)
  - Total: 92
  - Density: 42/km^{2} (110/sq mi)
- Postal code: 8000

Gornja Težka Voda (pronounced [ˈɡoːɾnja ˈtɛːʃka ˈʋɔːda]) is a settlement in the foothills of the Gorjanci Range in the City Municipality of Novo Mesto in southeastern Slovenia. The area is part of the traditional region of Lower Carniola and is now included in the Southeast Slovenia Statistical Region. In January 2026, the population was 92.

== Name ==
The names Gornja Težka Voda and neighboring Dolnja Težka Voda literally mean 'upper' and 'lower heavy water/creek', respectively. The name is derived from the creek north of the settlements, known as Težka voda (Heavy Creek), and was later transferred to the villages. The settlements were first recorded in German written records as Swernwazzer in 1393 (and as Swernwasser in 1439, and vom Swarem wasser in 1477). The name refers to slowly flowing water; the elevation difference between the source of the 6-kilometer (3.7 mi) creek and its outlet is only 7 meters (23 ft).

== Church ==
The local church, built on the northern outskirts of the village, is dedicated to Saint Urban and belongs to the Parish of Stopiče. It was built in the late 16th century and restyled in 1833.
