= Dolnja Težka Voda =

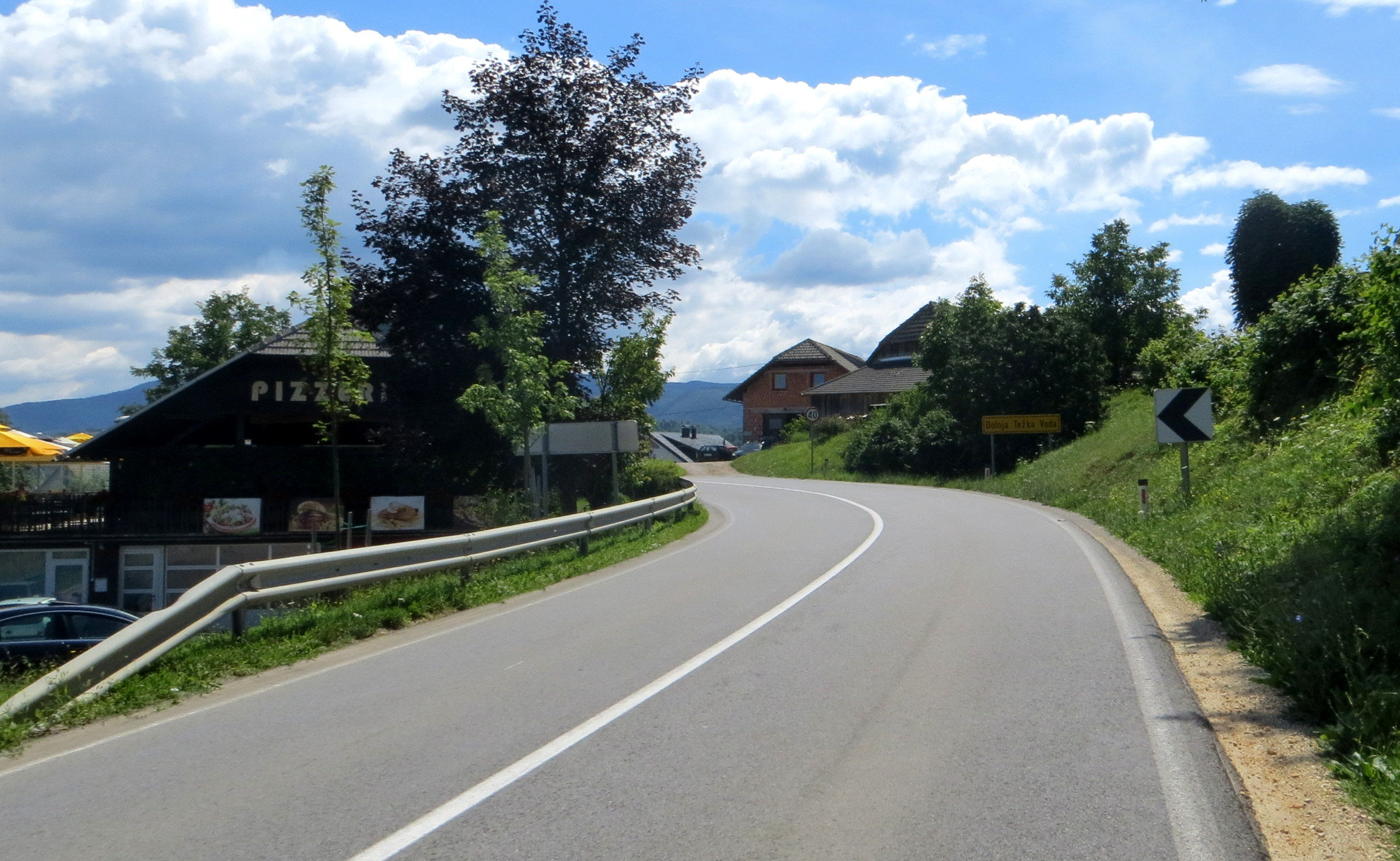

- Location in Slovenia
- Coordinates: 45°46′3.97″N 15°11′44.88″E
- Country: Slovenia
- Traditional region: Lower Carniola
- Statistical region: Southeast Slovenia
- Municipality: Novo Mesto

Area
  - Total: 1.341 km^{2} (0.518 sq mi)
- Elevation: 246.1 m (807 ft)

Population (2026)
  - Total: 221
  - Density: 165/km^{2} (430/sq mi)
- Postal code: 8000

Dolnja Težka Voda (pronounced [ˈdoːlnja ˈtɛːʃka ˈʋɔːda]) is a settlement south of Novo Mesto in southeastern Slovenia. It lies on the main road from Novo Mesto to Metlika. The entire area is part of the traditional region of Lower Carniola and is now included in the Southeast Slovenia Statistical Region. In January 2026, the population was 221.

== Name ==
The names Dolnja Težka Voda and neighboring Gornja Težka Voda literally mean 'lower' and 'upper heavy water/creek', respectively. The name is derived from the creek north of the settlements, known as Težka voda (Heavy Creek), and was later transferred to the villages. The settlements were first recorded in German written records as Swernwazzer in 1393 (and as Swernwasser in 1439, and vom Swarem wasser in 1477). The name refers to slowly flowing water; the elevation difference between the source of the 6 km creek and its outlet is only 7 m.
