= Uršna Sela =

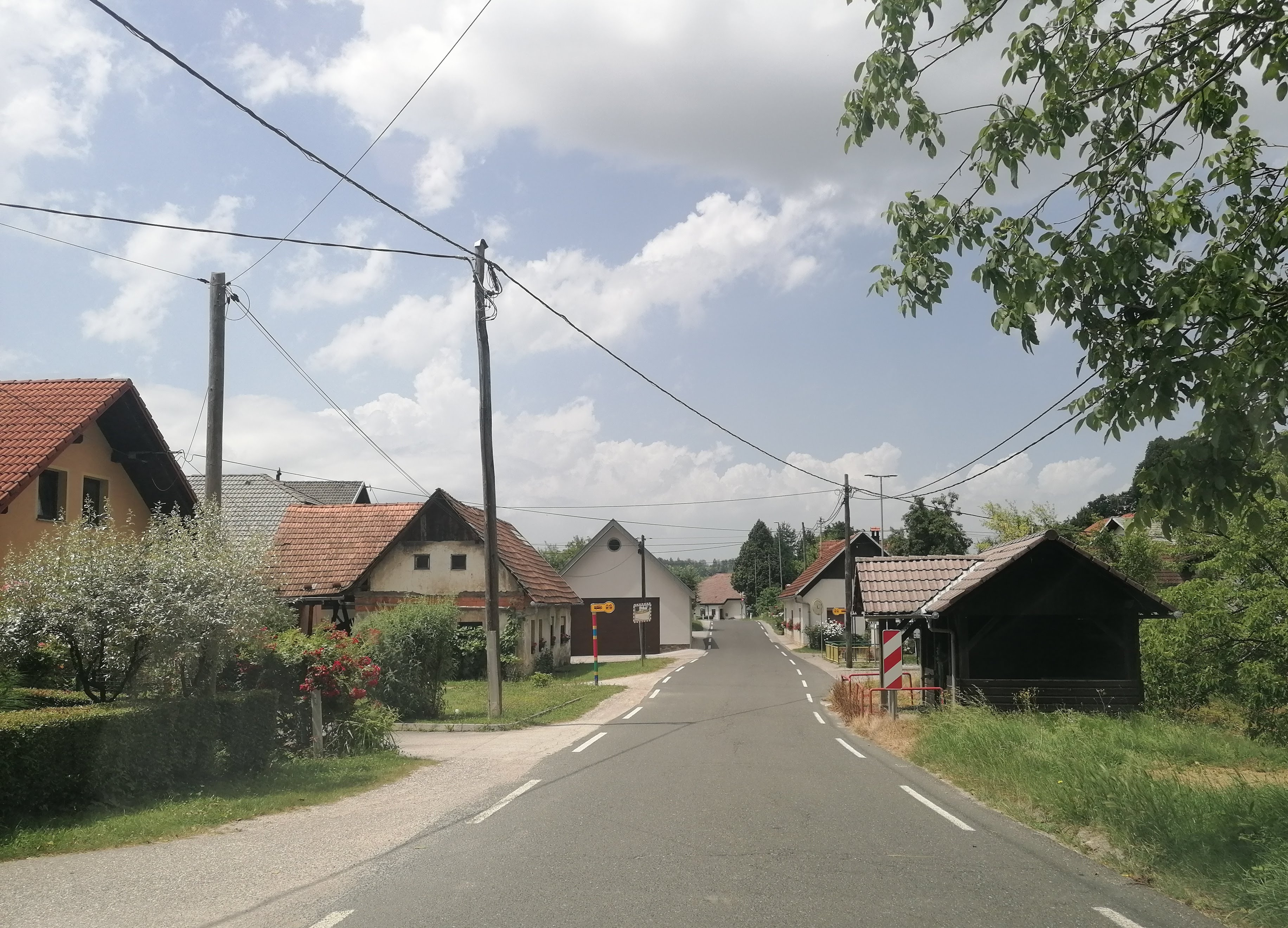

- Location in Slovenia
- Coordinates: 45°43′2.28″N 15°7′28.97″E
- Country: Slovenia
- Traditional region: Lower Carniola
- Statistical region: Southeast Slovenia
- Municipality: Novo Mesto

Area
  - Total: 12 km^{2} (4.6 sq mi)
- Elevation: 326.7 m (1,072 ft)

Population (2026)
  - Total: 684
  - Density: 57/km^{2} (150/sq mi)
- Postal code: 8000

Uršna Sela (pronounced [ˈuːɾʃna ˈseːla]; Slovene: Uršna sela) is a settlement south of Novo Mesto in southeastern Slovenia. The railway line from Ljubljana to Metlika runs through the settlement. The area is part of the traditional region of Lower Carniola and is now included in the Southeast Slovenia Statistical Region. In January 2026, the population was 684.

== Name ==
Uršna Sela was attested in written sources in 1477 as Werschndorff. The Slovene name was originally Vršna sela (literally, 'summit village'). The medieval attestation and the older Slovene name confirm that the name is derived from the Slovene common noun vrh 'peak, summit', referring to the location of the village at the intersection of three roads on a rise between Novo Mesto, Dolenjske Toplice, and Semič.

== Mass grave ==
Uršna Sela is the site of a mass grave from the Second World War. The Mihovec Cave Mass Grave (Slovene: Grobišče Mihovska jama), also known as the Mihovec Chasm above Šuštarček Meadow Mass Grave (Grobišče Mihovska prepadna nad Šuštarčkovo košenico), is located about 1.1 kilometers (0.68 mi) southwest of Mihovec, on the north slope of Linden Peak (Lipni vrh) on the Radoha Plateau. A Partisan unit shot 14 to 17 Slovenes in front of the cave between October 21 and 23, 1943 and threw their bodies into the cave. The names of nine victims are known and are engraved on a memorial cross at the site.

== Churches ==
The local church, built on the southern outskirts of the village, is dedicated to the Holy Cross and belongs to the Parish of Toplice. It was built in the first half of the 17th century.

A second church is built on Ljuben Hill north of the settlement. It is dedicated to Saint Vitus and belongs to the Parish of Novo Mesto–Šmihel. It was first mentioned in written documents dating to 1477 and was refurbished in the Baroque style in the 18th century.
