= Veliki Slatnik =

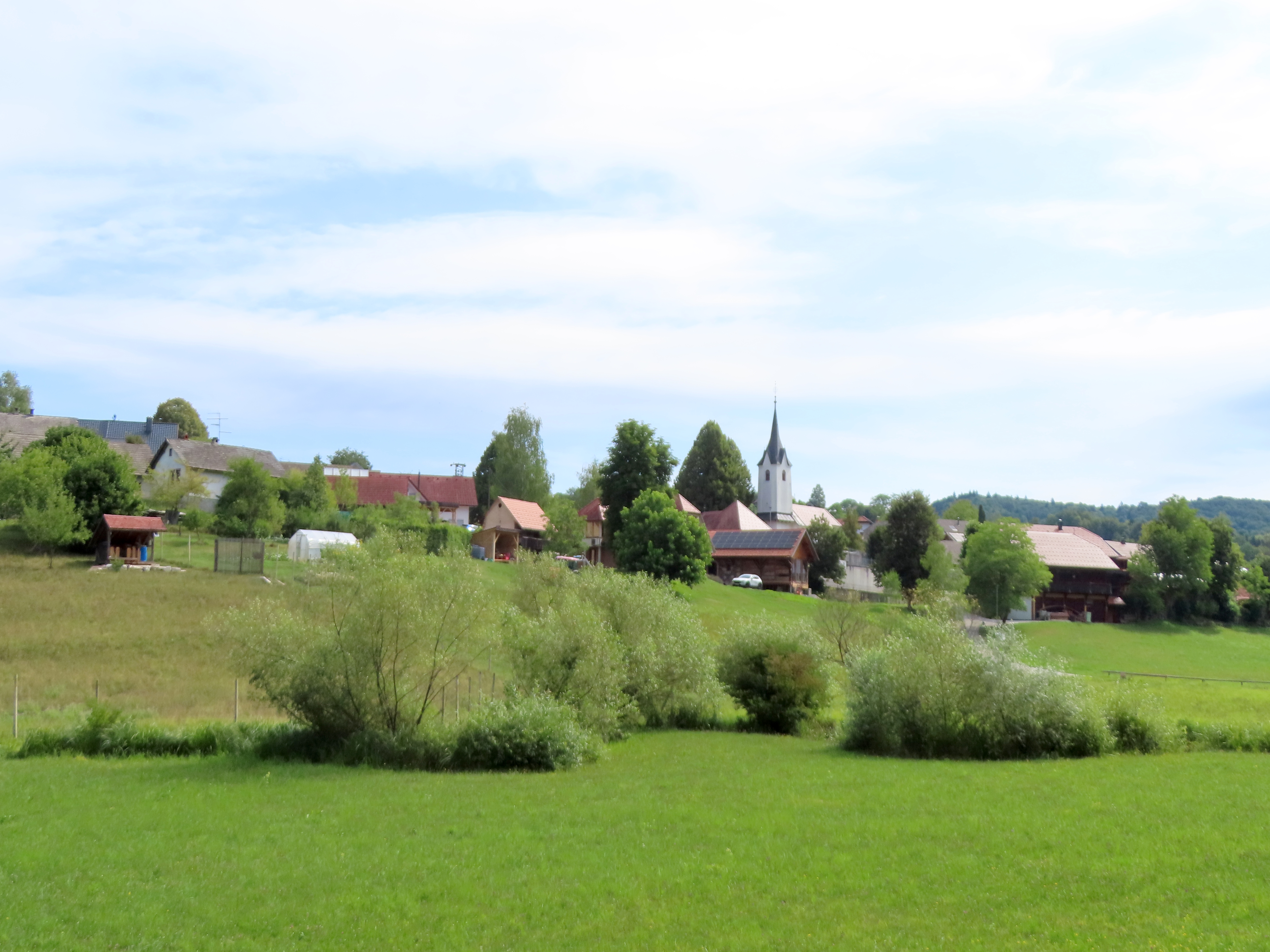

- Location in Slovenia
- Coordinates: 45°47′41.26″N 15°13′38.68″E
- Country: Slovenia
- Traditional region: Lower Carniola
- Statistical region: Southeast Slovenia
- Municipality: Novo Mesto

Area
  - Total: 2.396 km^{2} (0.925 sq mi)
- Elevation: 207.9 m (682 ft)

Population (2026)
  - Total: 189
  - Density: 79/km^{2} (200/sq mi)
- Postal code: 8000

Veliki Slatnik (pronounced [ˈʋeːliki ˈslaːtnik], in older sources also Veliki Slatenek, German: Großslatenegg) is a settlement in the hills east of Novo Mesto in southeastern Slovenia. The area is part of the traditional region of Lower Carniola and is now included in the Southeast Slovenia Statistical Region. In January 2026, the population was 189.

The local church in the village is dedicated to Our Lady of Sorrows and belongs to the Parish of Novo Mesto–Sveti Lenart. It was built in the late 17th century.
