= Stope, Velike Lašče =

Stope
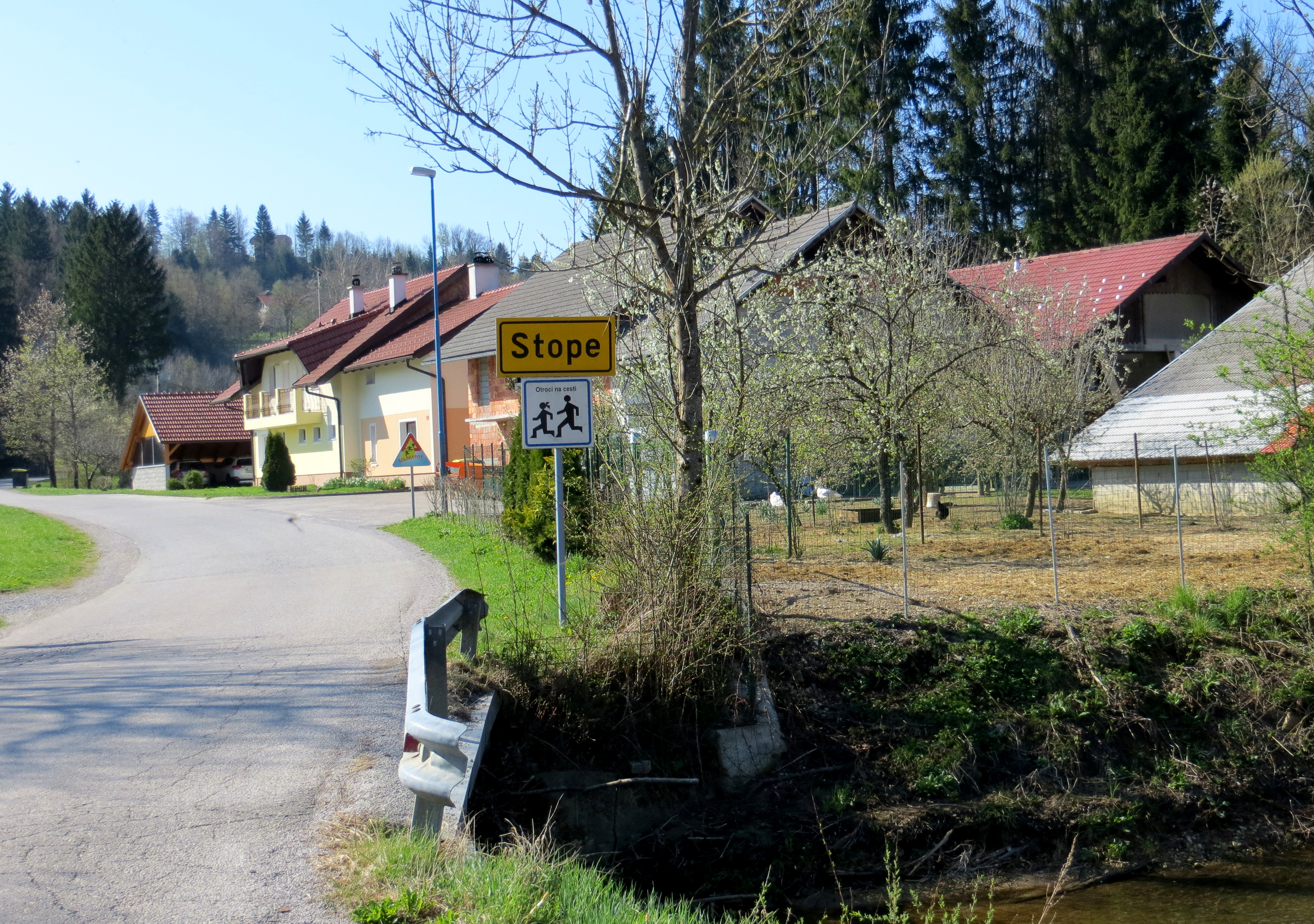

- Location in Slovenia
- Coordinates: 45°50′20.56″N 14°35′54.01″E
- Country: Slovenia
- Traditional region: Lower Carniola
- Statistical region: Central Slovenia
- Municipality: Velike Lašče

Area
  - Total: 0.44 km^{2} (0.17 sq mi)
- Elevation: 525.9 m (1,725 ft)

Population (2002)
  - Total: 33
- Postal code: 1315

Stope (pronounced [ˈstoːpɛ]) is a settlement at the northern end of the Mišja Valley (Slovene: Mišja dolina) southwest of Rašica in the Municipality of Velike Lašče in central Slovenia. The entire municipality is part of the traditional region of Lower Carniola and is now included in the Central Slovenia Statistical Region.
