= Podgrad, Novo Mesto =

Podgrad
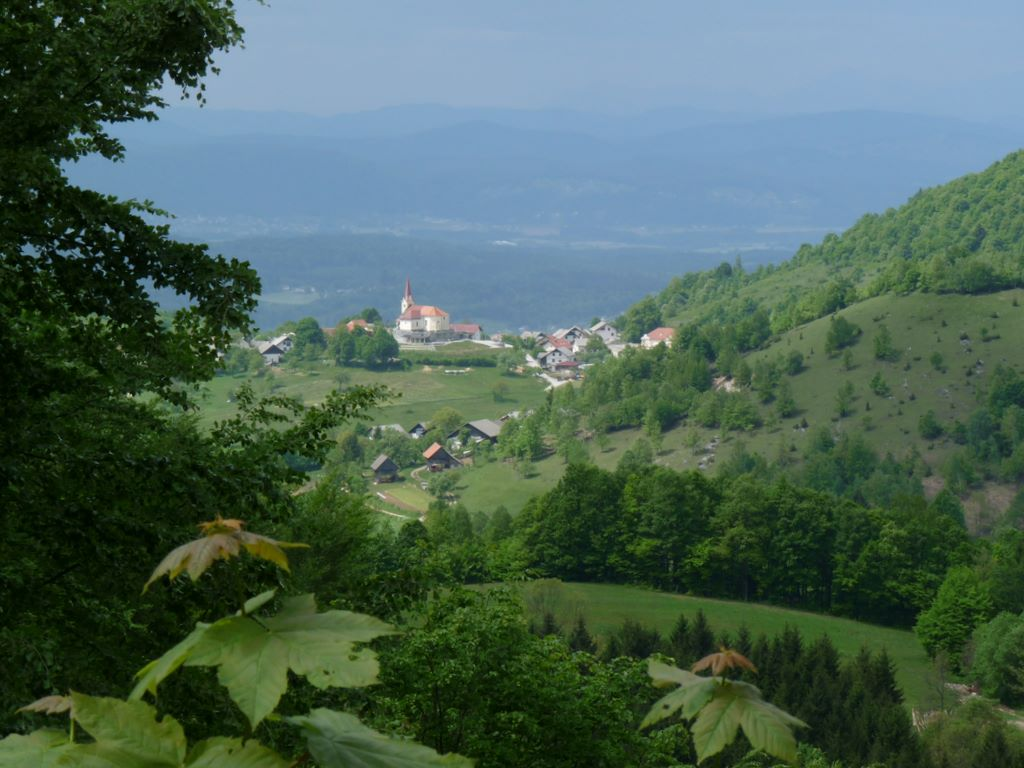

- Location in Slovenia
- Coordinates: 45°44′3.11″N 15°12′2.03″E
- Country: Slovenia
- Traditional region: Lower Carniola
- Statistical region: Southeast Slovenia
- Municipality: Novo Mesto

Area
  - Total: 1.664 km^{2} (0.642 sq mi)
- Elevation: 446.5 m (1,465 ft)

Population (2026)
  - Total: 120
  - Density: 72/km^{2} (190/sq mi)
- Postal code: 8000

Podgrad (pronounced [pɔdˈɡɾáːt, ˈpɔ̀ːdɡɾat]) is a settlement south of Novo Mesto in southeastern Slovenia. The area is part of the traditional region of Lower Carniola and is now included in the Southeast Slovenia Statistical Region. In January 2026, the population was 120.

The local parish church, built on a slight elevation on the edge of the village, is dedicated to the Our Lady of Good Counsel and belongs to the Roman Catholic Diocese of Novo Mesto. It was built in the early 17th century and extensively rebuilt in the 19th century.
