= Cerovec pri Črešnjevcu =

- Location in Slovenia
- Coordinates: 45°39′25.18″N 15°14′44.56″E
- Country: Slovenia
- Traditional region: Lower Carniola
- Statistical region: Southeast Slovenia
- Municipality: Semič

Area
  - Total: 2 km^{2} (0.77 sq mi)
- Elevation: 216.6 m (711 ft)

Population (2002)
  - Total: 68

Cerovec pri Črešnjevcu (pronounced [tsɛˈɾɔːʋəts pɾi ˈtʃɾeːʃnjɛu̯tsu]) is a settlement in the Municipality of Semič in southeastern Slovenia. The area is part of the historical region of Lower Carniola and the municipality is now included in the Southeast Slovenia Statistical Region.

== Name ==
The name of the settlement was changed from Cerovec to Cerovec pri Črešnjevcu in 1955.
