= Cerovec pod Bočem =

- Location in Slovenia
- Coordinates: 46°15′19.37″N 15°38′58.92″E
- Country: Slovenia
- Traditional region: Styria
- Statistical region: Savinja
- Municipality: Rogaška Slatina

Area
  - Total: 3.88 km^{2} (1.50 sq mi)
- Elevation: 308 m (1,010 ft)

Population (2002)
  - Total: 320

Cerovec pod Bočem (pronounced [tsɛˈɾɔːʋəts pɔd ˈboːtʃɛm] or [tsɛˈɾoːʋəts pɔd ˈboːtʃɛm]) is a settlement at the southern foothills of Mount Boč in eastern Slovenia. It belongs to the Municipality of Rogaška Slatina. The area belongs to the traditional Styria region and is now included in the Savinja Statistical Region.

== Name ==
The name of the settlement was changed from Cerovec to Cerovec pod Bočem in 1955.
