= Kupčina =

Location
- Country: Croatia

Physical characteristics
- Source
  - location: Cernik, Žumberak
  - coordinates: 45.7385°N 15.4109°E
- Mouth
  - location: Kupa
  - coordinates: 45.5216°N 15.7850°E
- Length: 56 km (35 mi)
- Basin size: 614 km^{2} (237 sq mi)

Basin features
- Progression: Kupa→ Sava→ Danube→ Black Sea

Kupčina (pronounced [kupt͡ʃina]) is a river in central Croatia, a left tributary of Kupa. It is 56 kilometres (35 mi) long and its basin covers an area of 614 square kilometres (237 sq mi).

Kupčina rises in the mountainous areas of Žumberak in the village of Cernik near Sošice, and flows towards the southeast near the eponymous village of Kupčina Žumberačka. It turns slightly to the south, passes near Krašić, and turns back southeast past another eponymous village of Gornja Kupčina, before it enters a wide lowland area near Draganić. It is then partially rerouted into a series of man-made drainage canals before it flows into the Kupa near Donja Kupčina.
