= Pangrč Grm =

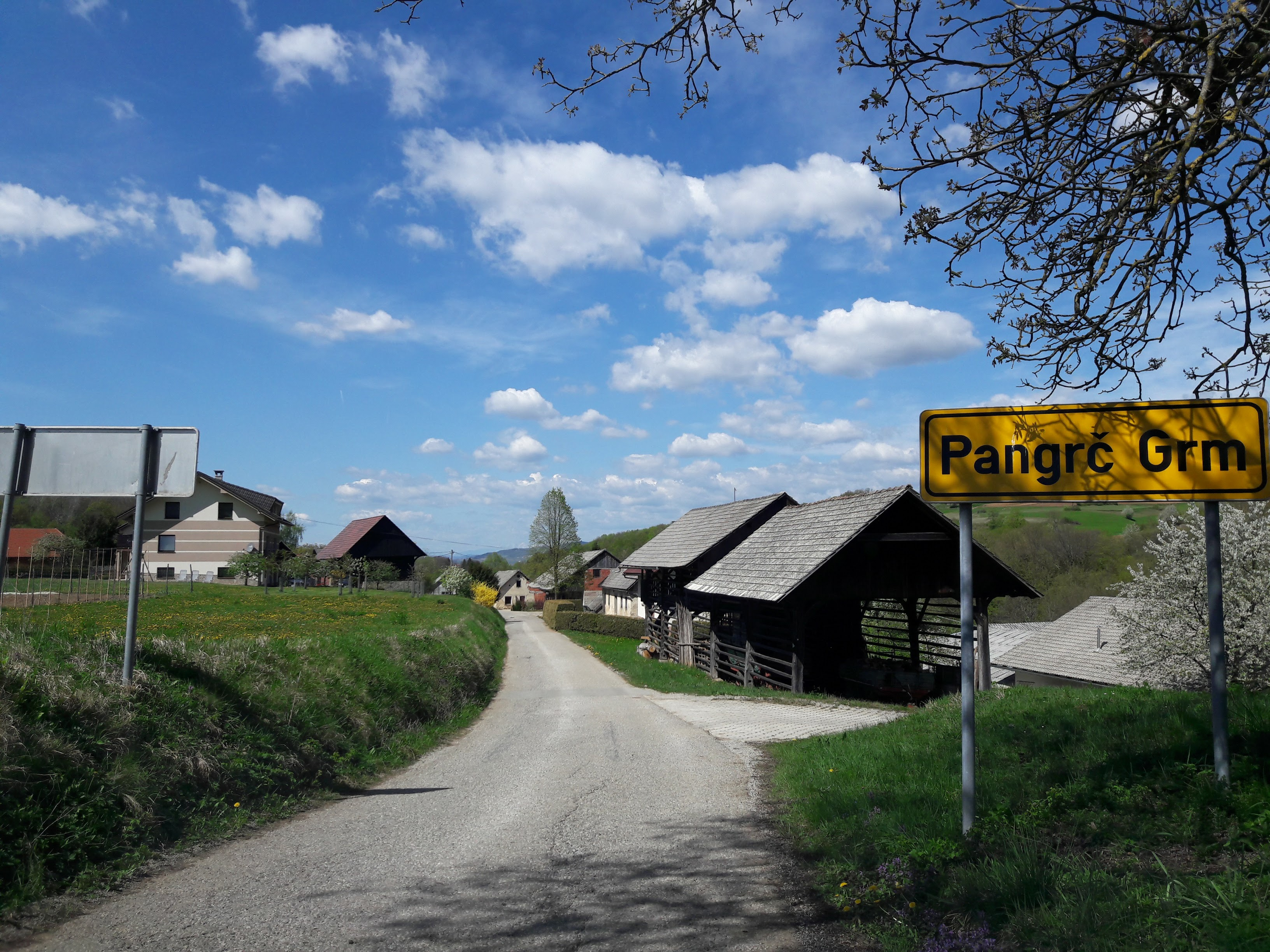

- Location in Slovenia
- Coordinates: 45°46′20.03″N 15°15′35.46″E
- Country: Slovenia
- Traditional region: Lower Carniola
- Statistical region: Southeast Slovenia
- Municipality: Novo Mesto

Area
  - Total: 1.288 km^{2} (0.497 sq mi)
- Elevation: 301 m (988 ft)

Population (2026)
  - Total: 54
  - Density: 42/km^{2} (110/sq mi)
- Postal code: 8000

Pangrč Grm (pronounced [ˈpaːŋɡəɾdʒ ˈɡəɾm]) is a settlement in the foothills of the Gorjanci Mountains in the City Municipality of Novo Mesto in southeastern Slovenia. The area is part of the traditional region of Lower Carniola and is now included in the Southeast Slovenia Statistical Region. In January 2026, the population was 54.

The local church, built on the edge of a forest above the village to the south, on the old route over the Gorjanci Hills towards White Carniola, is dedicated to Saint Nicholas and belongs to the Parish of Stopiče. It is an originally 14th-century Romanesque building that was restyled in the Baroque in the 18th century.
