= Žumberak Mountains =

Mountain range in northwestern Croatia and southeastern Slovenia

Žumberak Mountains / Gorjanci
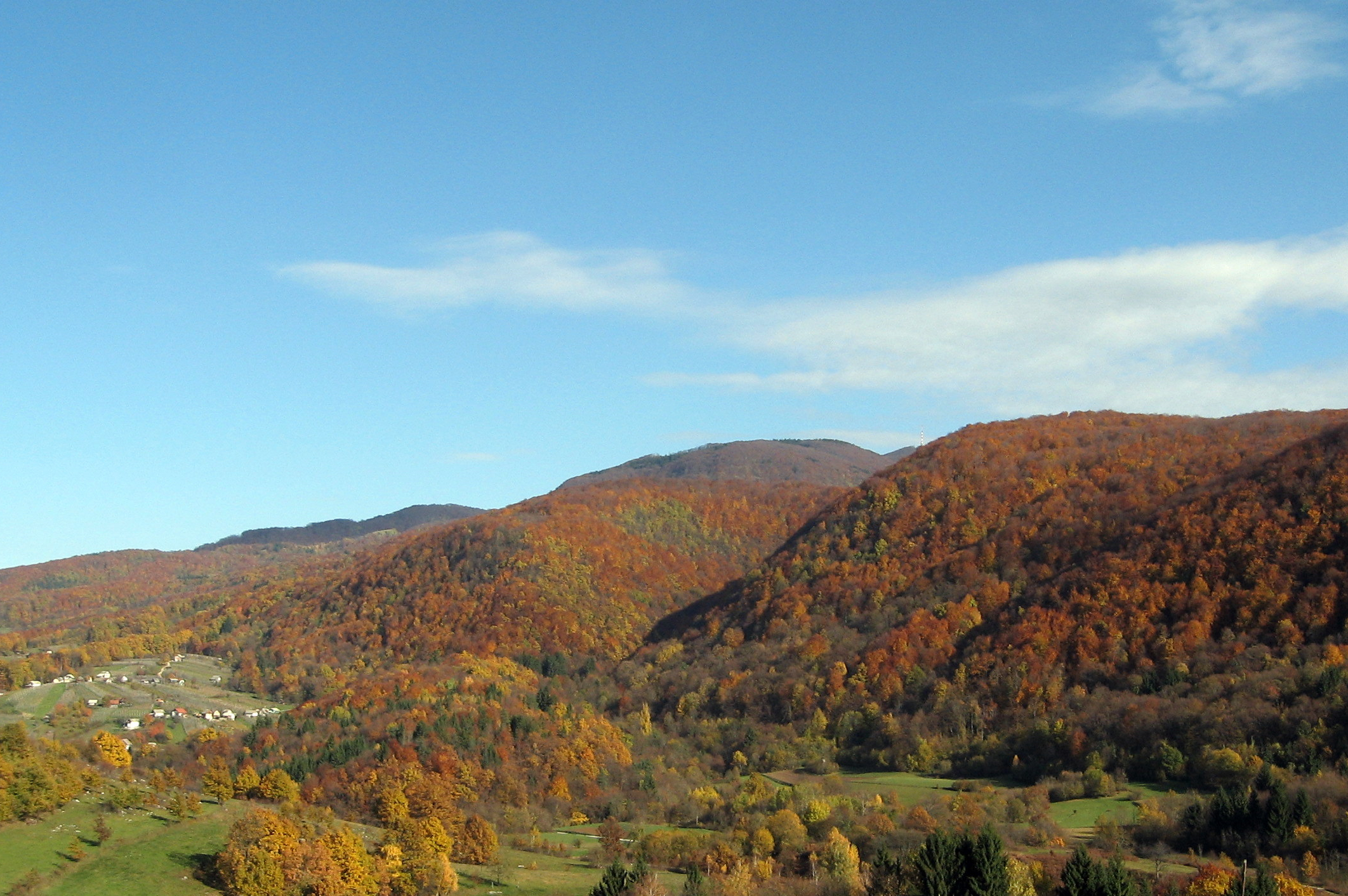
- View of Gorjanci, the highest ridge, with Trdina Peak, from Slovenia. The village of Pangrč Grm is visible at the foot.

Highest point
- Peak: Sveta Gera / Trdina Peak
- Coordinates: 45°45′37″N 15°19′15″E

Geography
- Location within Croatia Location within Slovenia
- Location: Croatia, Slovenia
- Parent range: Dinaric Alps

Geology
- Rock age: mostly Triassic
- Mountain type(s): Dolomite, Limestone

The Žumberak Mountains (Croatian: Žumberačka gora, Slovene: Gorjanci, historic German name: Uskokengebirge) is a range of hills and mountains in northwestern Croatia and southeastern Slovenia, extending from the southwest to the northeast between the Krka and the Kupa.

It covers an area of 430 km^{2} (170 sq mi). The geographically unified massif consists of two parts, separated by the Bregana and Žumberak rivers (Croatian: Žumberačka rijeka). The northeastern part is the Samobor Hills (Croatian: Samoborsko gorje) with the foothills. The central and western part is named Žumberak Hills (Croatian: Žumberačko gorje, Žumberak). Its northwesternmost part, named Gorjanci, lies in Slovenia. The highest peak of the range is Sveta Gera (Trdina Peak) on the border between Croatia and Slovenia, with an elevation of 1,178 m (3,865 ft). Since 1999, an area of the range in Croatia has been protected as the Žumberak–Samobor Hills Nature Park.

== Location ==
The Žumberak Mountains stand near and partly on the border between Croatia and Slovenia, which mostly passes through the highest parts of the massif. The Croatian part of the mountain range is in Central Croatia, mostly in the western part of Zagreb County, and a smaller part is in Karlovac County. The Slovene part belongs to the traditional region of Lower Carniola. The Žumberak Mountains are situated only 25 km (16 mi) from the Croatian capital, Zagreb. Cities near this range are Samobor, Jastrebarsko, and Ozalj in Croatia, and Novo Mesto, Brežice, and Kostanjevica na Krki in Slovenia. The range is in territory of four cities:

- Samobor, Novo Mesto, Jastrebarsko, and Ozalj

and seven municipalities

- Krško, Kostanjevica na Krki, Šentjernej, Brežice, Žumberak, Krašić, and Klinča Sela.

=== Border dispute ===
The highest peak, Sveta Gera / Trdina Peak, is subject to a border dispute between Croatia and Slovenia. An old Yugoslav People's Army barracks building stands there that is used as an outpost by the Slovenian Army since the 1990s, although it is recorded in the Croatian land registry, and Croatian side see this as an occupation of their land. Since then that has been a subject of a dispute between the two new countries.

The situation became more complex when the dispute nearly derailed Croatia's application to join NATO. It escalated further with Slovenia's blockade of Croatia's EU accession from December 2008 until September–October 2009, when Slovenia (a European Union member state) blocked the negotiation progress of Croatia (at the time an EU candidate state). However, further escalation was prevented due to amicable diplomacy of the Croatian and Slovenian prime ministers Jadranka Kosor, and Borut Pahor.

== Geology ==
There is a group of karst dolines on the hills by Bregana called Ponikve.

=== Speleology ===
Žumberak has hundreds of limestone caves. The deepest is Gorjanc at 226 m, and the longest is Provala at 2161 m. On the Croatian side, the deepest is Dolača at 155 m.

== Flora and Funga ==
There are more than 1,000 species of different plant life recorded in this area, some of which are strictly protected. In the area of the Nature Park 90 species of Croatian vascular flora from the Red Book are recorded. On the global level 3 of them are critically endangered, 11 are endangered and 28 are globally sensitive.

Forests cover huge area of the range. there are few old-growth forests mostly on the Slovene part of the highest ridge, close to Sveta Gera. These are Old-growth forest Ravna Gora, and old-growth forest on Trdina Peak. Most common are the forests of sessile oak and hornbeam and on steeper slopes are the forests of Downy Oak and hop hornbeam. Beech forests cover the highest ridges. Some endangered and protected plants are found here, such as are globally sensitive species Iris croatica and Daphne blagayana. Globally sensitive species of wild orchids and lilies can be found in areas between forests and open habitats.

There is only a small area of grassland of natural origin. The local population exploited grassland. Grassland are rich in species. In some areas more than 40 species of plants have been recorded on one square meter! Many of them are in the Red Book of vascular flora in Croatia. The areas of damp and marsh-like grassland and plain and moors also can be found here. Important example is the area along the Jasinje creek where even 7 strongly protected and 12 protected plant species have been recorded. Among them we stress critically endangered species on global level – tall cottongrass (Eriophorum angustifolium) and alpine asphodel (Tofieldia calyculata); globally endangered species of sedges, globally sensitive species: grass-like sedge (Carex panicea) and lesser butterfly-orchid (Platanthera bifolia) and species with the status of not sufficiently explored (DD) in Croatia, elongated sedge (Carex elongata).

There are 377 species of mushrooms in the Park area. It is supposed that this is only smaller number of a total number of mushrooms in this area, In the research carried on in 2007, seven new species of mushrooms were found in Žumberak – Samoborsko gorje Nature Park. Arched woodwax (Hygrophorus camarophyllus) is on the Red List of the mushrooms in Croatia with EN category of endanger (globally endangered species).

There are 79 discovered species of lichens, three of which are on the Red List of lichens in Croatia. These are Bryoria fuscescens (with status VU – sensitive family), Lobaria pulmonaria (with status EN – endangered family) and genus Usnea (status VU). The research discovered several localities rich in lichen species like wild forest of beech in area of Kuti and wider area of Budinjak, Sv. Gera. Old orchards in grassland are explored as well. Following families are found and put on the Red List of Croatia: Baeomyces rufus (almost endangered species – NT), Dibaeis baeomyces (VU), Lobaria pulmonaria (VU), Menegazzia terebrata (VU) and Solorina saccata (VU).

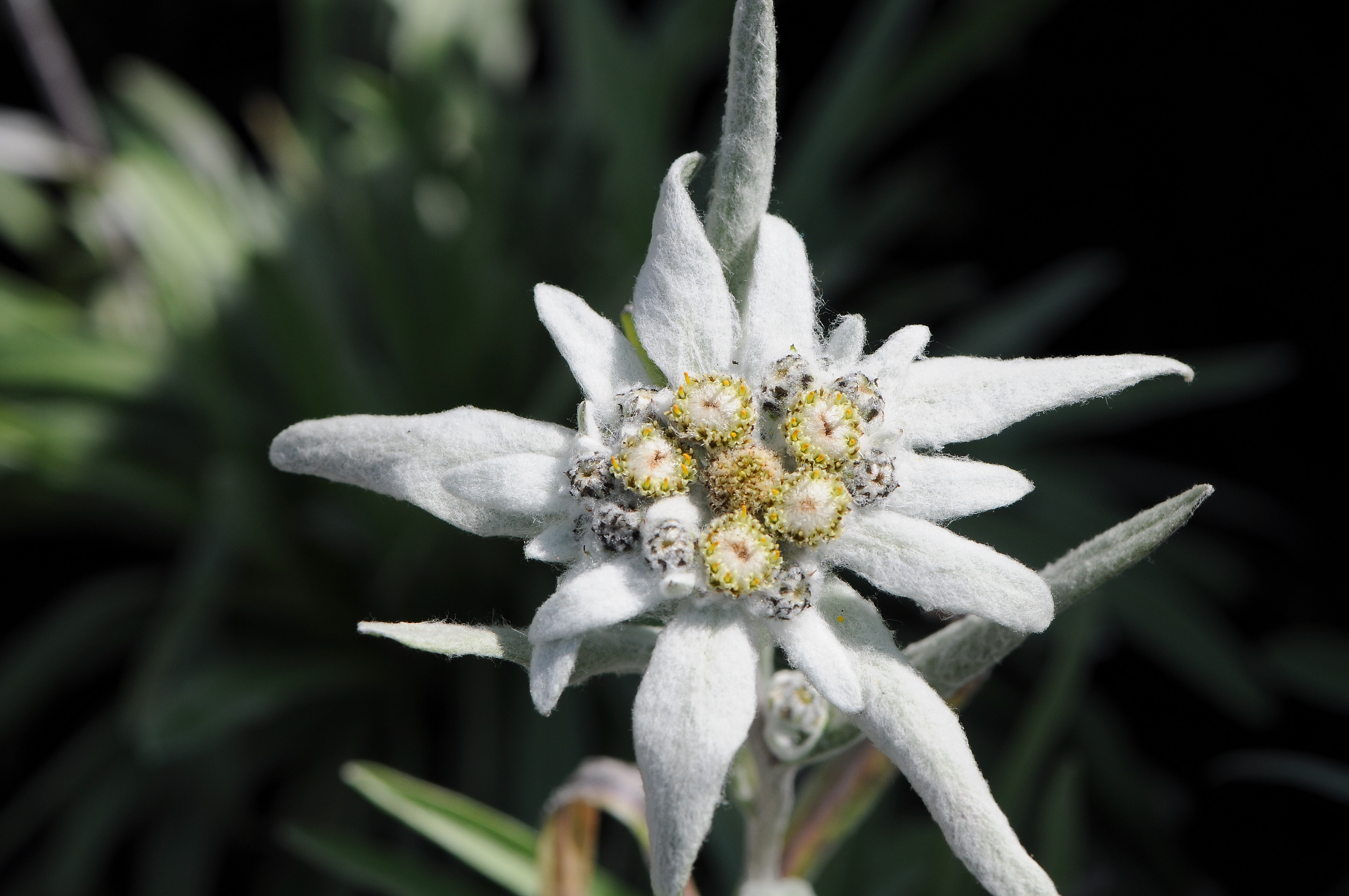
Edelweiss (Leontopodium alpinum)

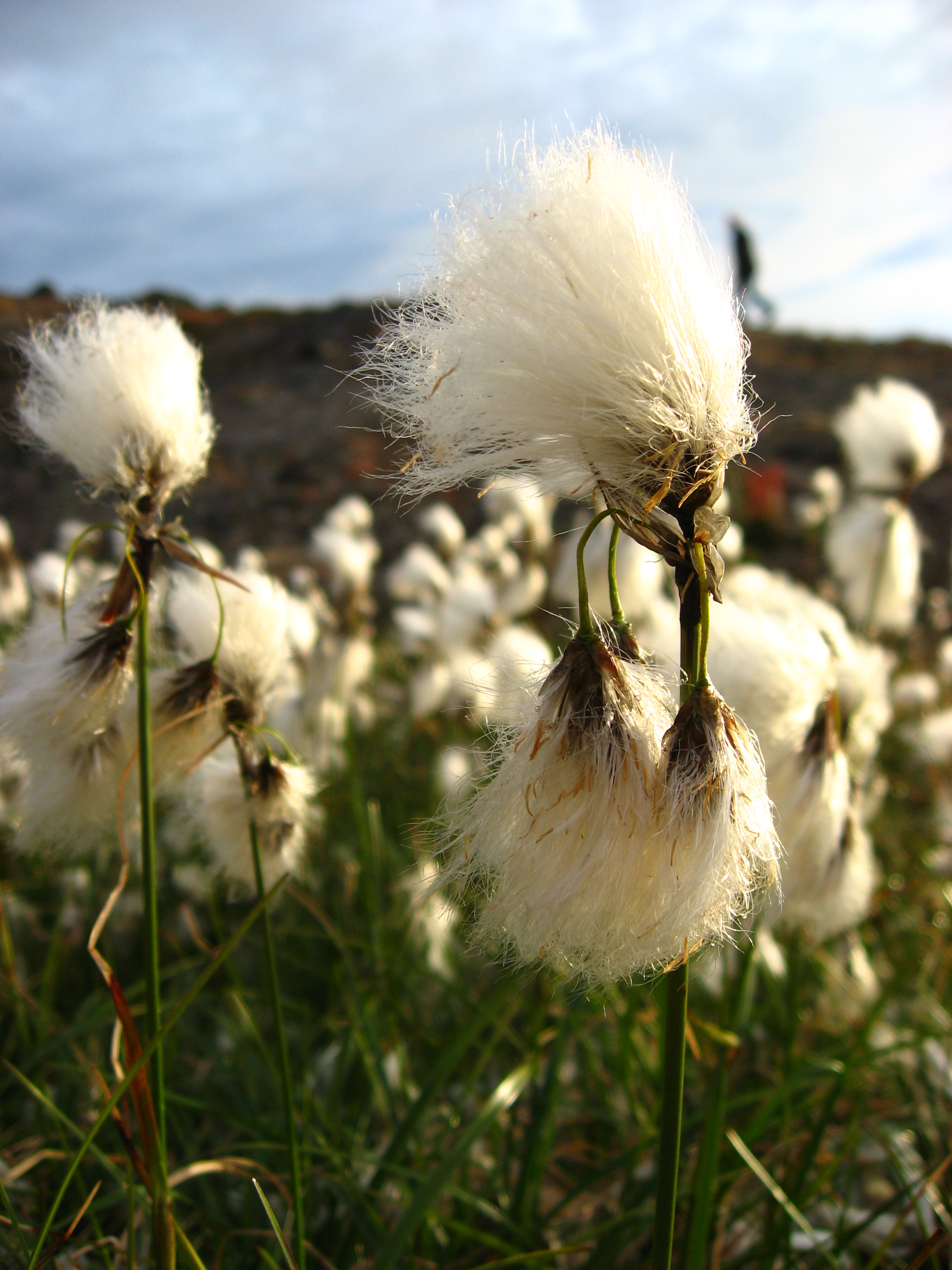
Common cottonsedge (Eriophorum angustifolium)

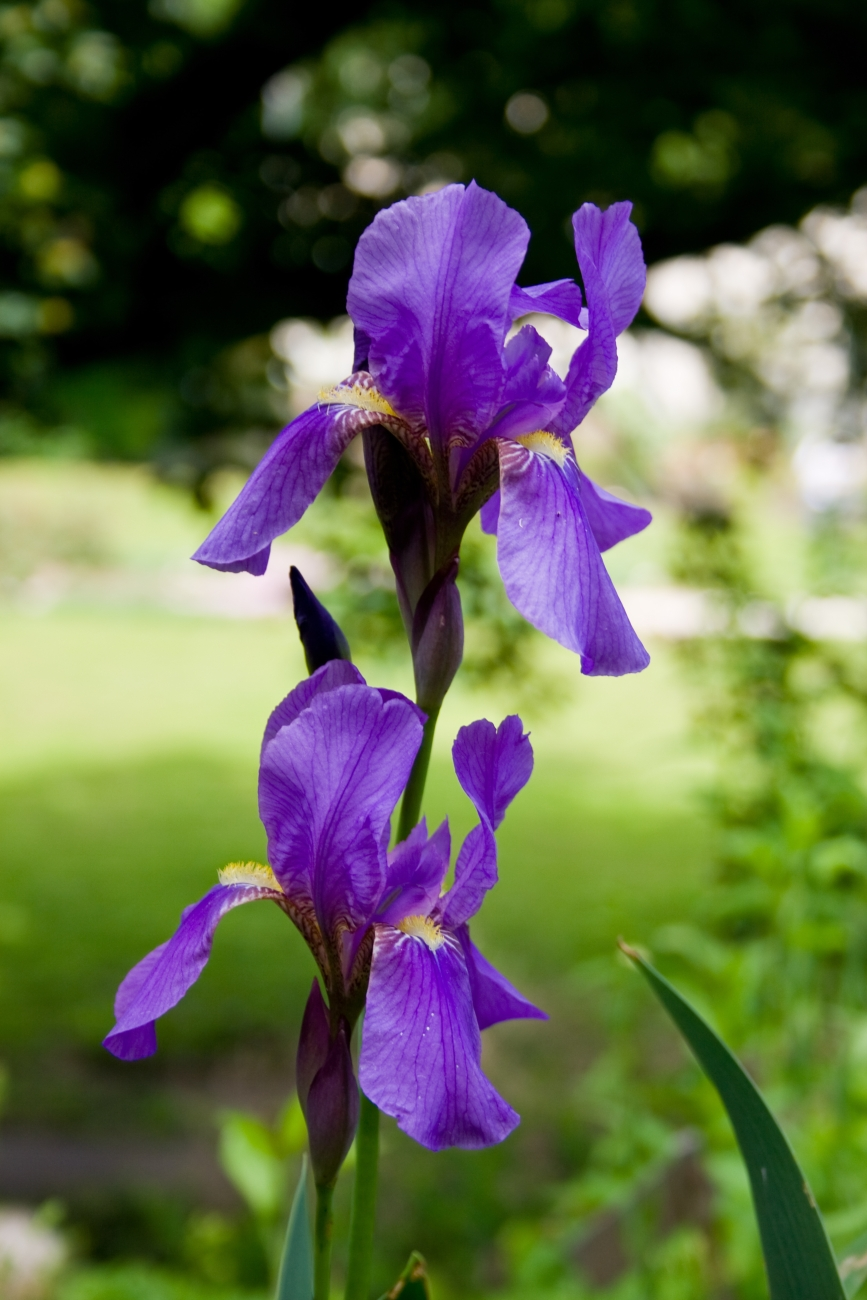
Iris croatica

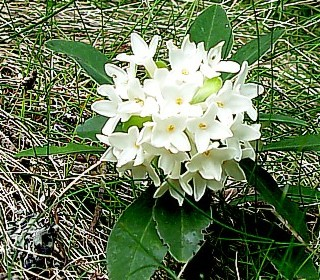
Daphne blagayana

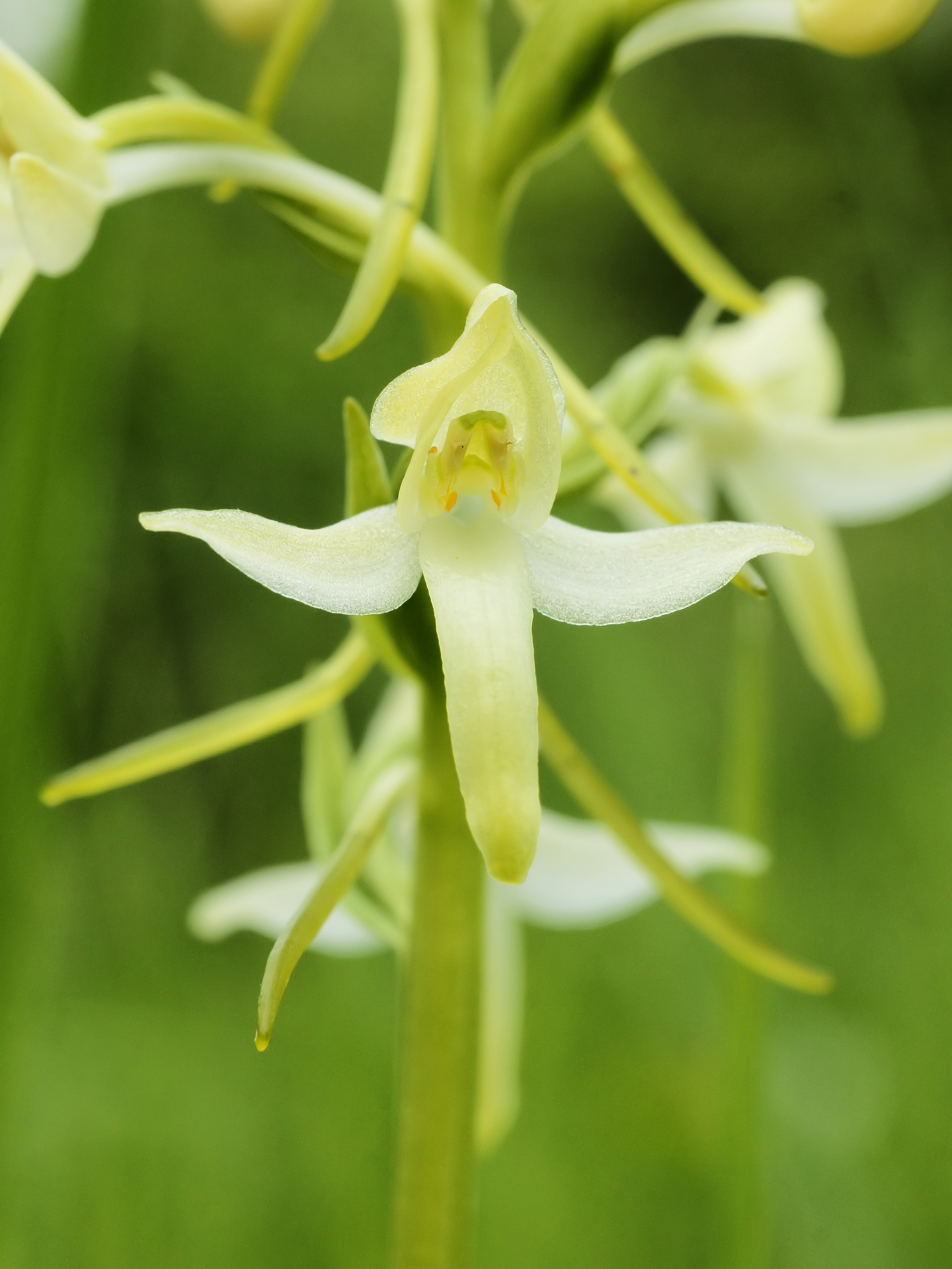
Lesser Butterfly-orchid (Platanthera bifolia)

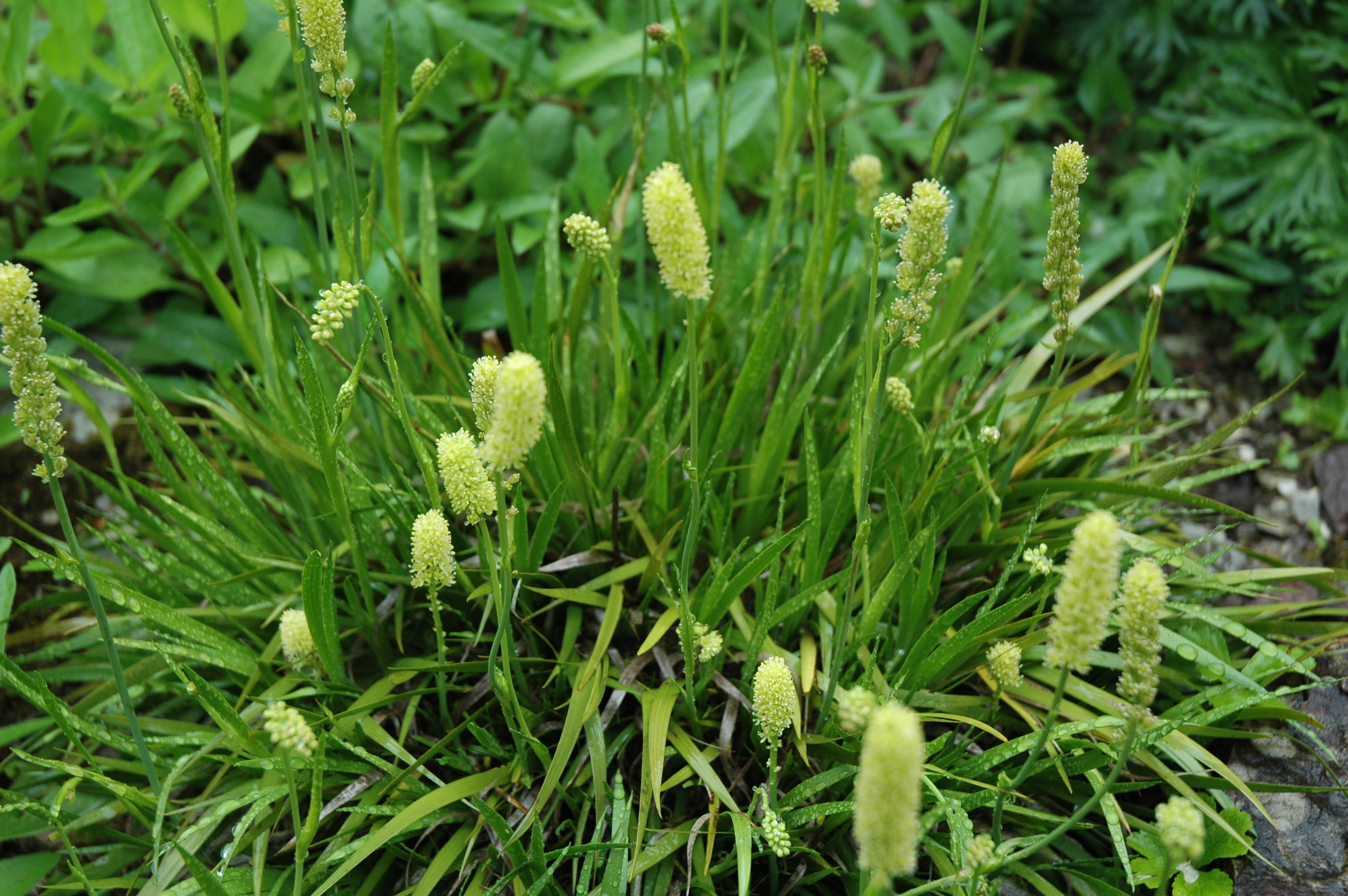
Tofieldia calyculata

== Fauna ==
Here you may see large predators as bears (Ursus arctos) and wolf (Canis lupus). There are also numerous species of small mammals, amphibians, reptiles, and invertebrates. There are many birds living in this area. Some are birds of prey like goshawk, and birds living next to creeks (white-throated dipper and grey wagtail). In lower parts, the grey heron (Ardea cinerea) can be found, and, occasionally, even white stork (Ciconia ciconia). Most of amphibian and reptile species which you can find in continental Croatia, can be found here. Spotted salamander (Salamandra salamandra) is a regular inhabitant of the areas near creeks. Very rare black salamanders (Salamandra atra) can be found in higher areas. Ponds are hatching places for amphibians like toads, newts and frogs. Snakes are common here. Venomous snakes - Viper (Vipera ammodytes) and grass snake (Natrix natrix), and nonvenomous - Aesculapian snake (Elaphe longissima), smooth snake (Coronella austriaca) and dice snake (Natrix tessellata) – strictly protected species listed on the Red List. The commonest lizard is wall lizard (Podarcis muralis), slow-worm (Anguis fragilis), European green lizard (Lacerta viridis) and common lizard (Lacerta vivipara).

There are 21 species of fish, from 8 families. They live in river Kupa, Kupčina, and other rivers and creeks in the area. Some of them are Eudontomyzon vladykovi, Squalius cephalus and Cobitis elongata. Brown trout are common due to suitable ecological conditions (water temperature, quantity of oxygen and creeks' speed).

Austropotamobius torrentium, the stone crayfish, can be found in creeks, although very rarely. There are numerous invertebrates which enrich biological diversity of the area. Many are endangered. However, due to insufficient research, not all are recorded. The most endangered is Phengaris rebeli. There are numerous species of invertebrates, in caves and holes, that have not been explored yet. There are bats as well – the most endangered mammal. Recent exploration of karstic underground in the Park discovered some species of arthropods, which are completely new in science.

Lepidoptera include Adscita statices, A. mannii, Zygaena purpuralis lathyri, Z. carniolica carniolica and Zygaena viciae.

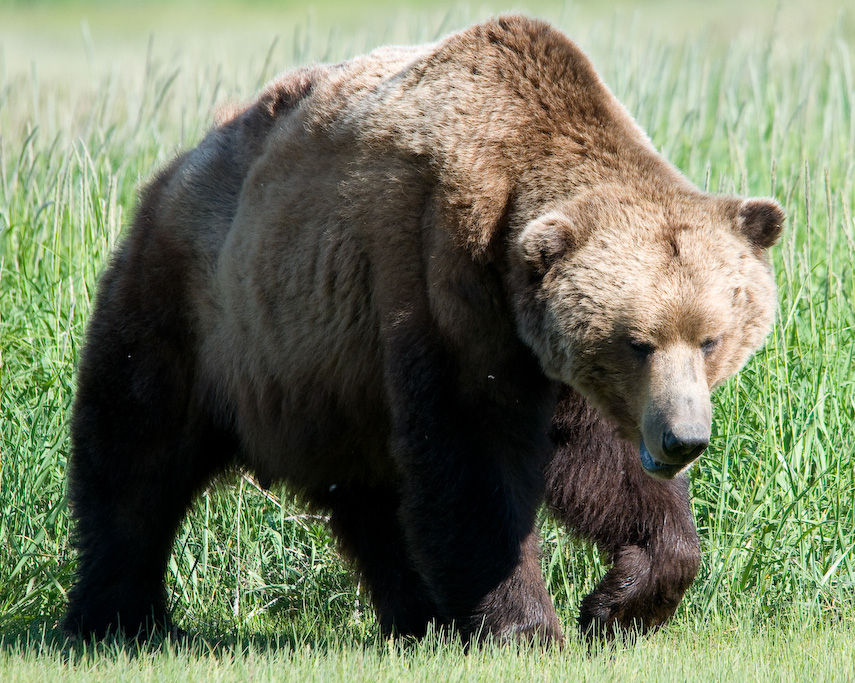
brown bear

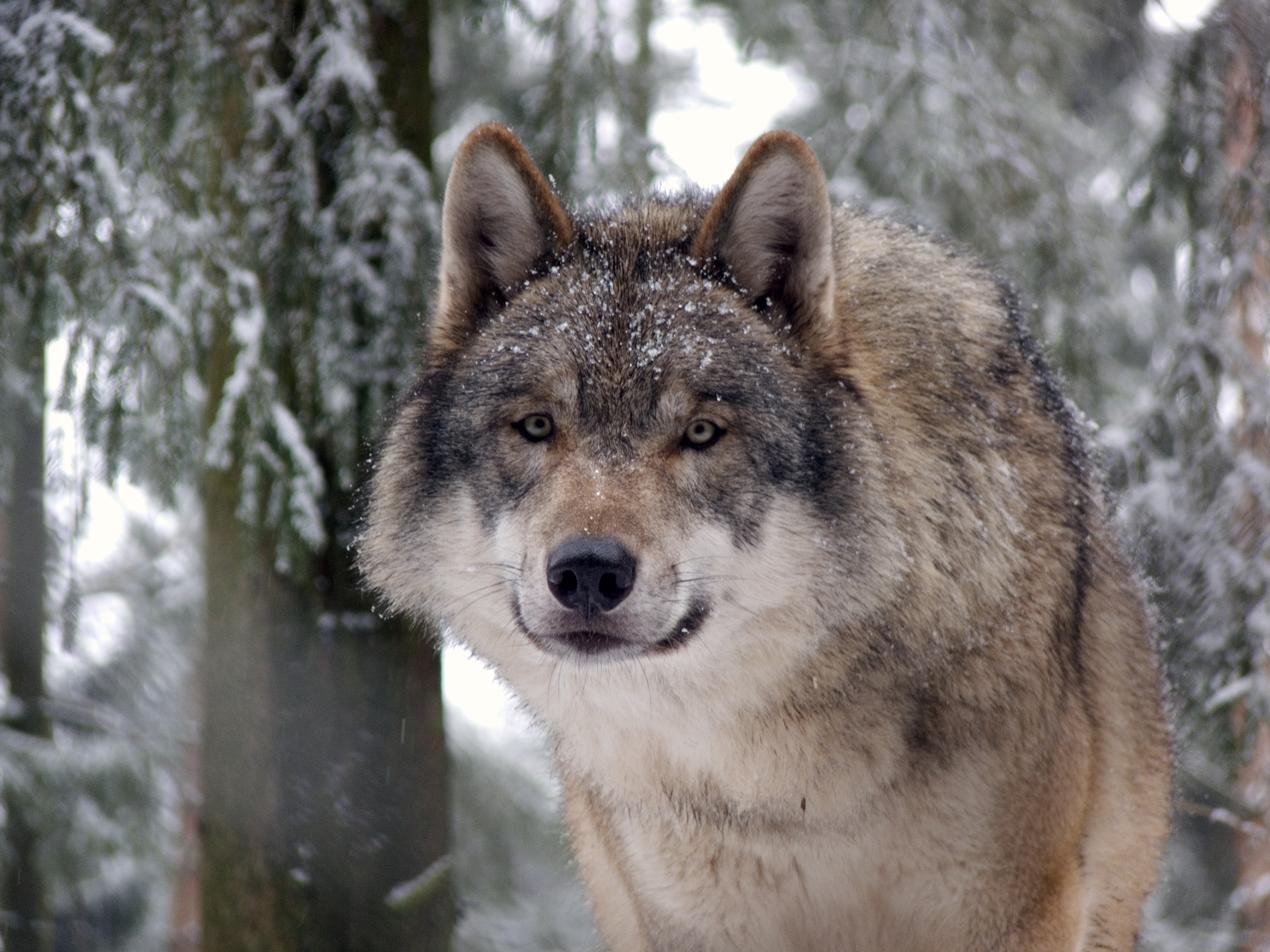
wolf

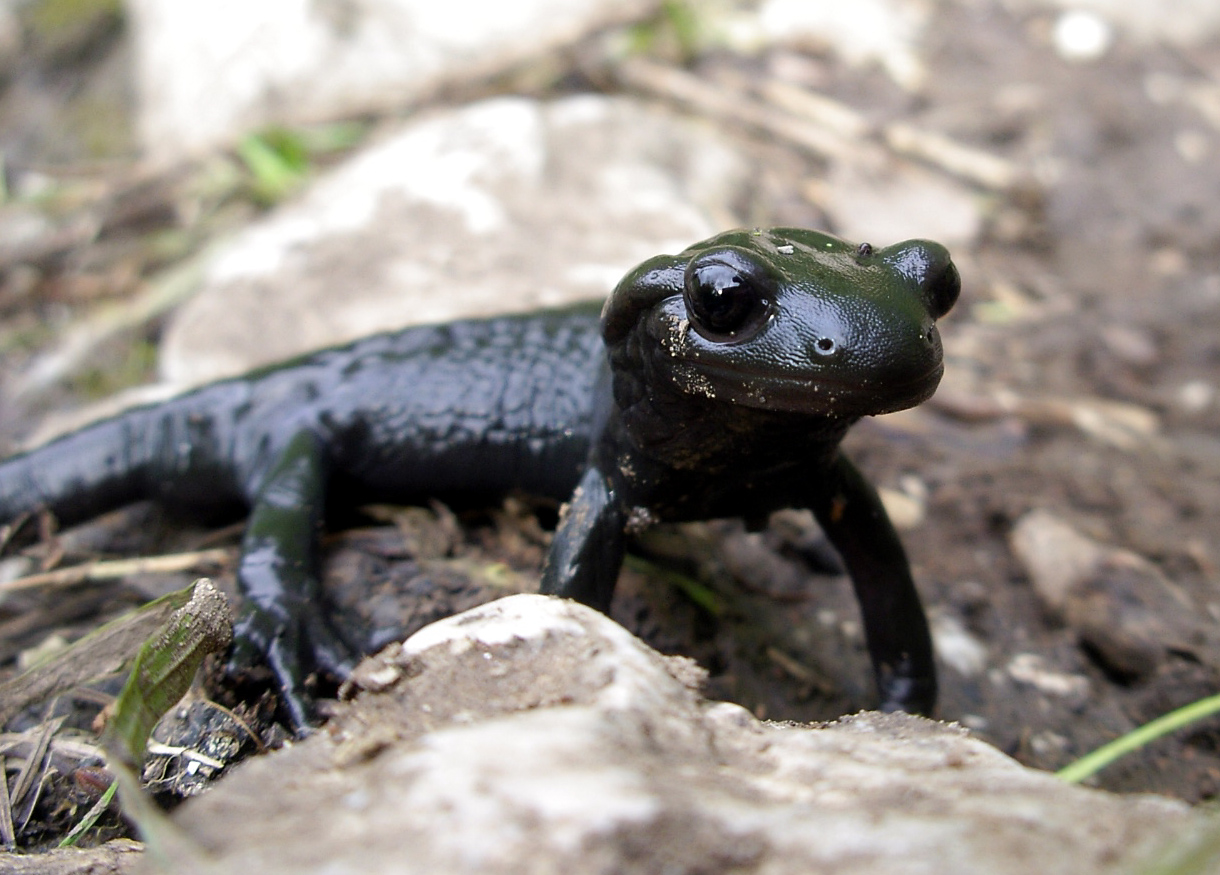
black salamander

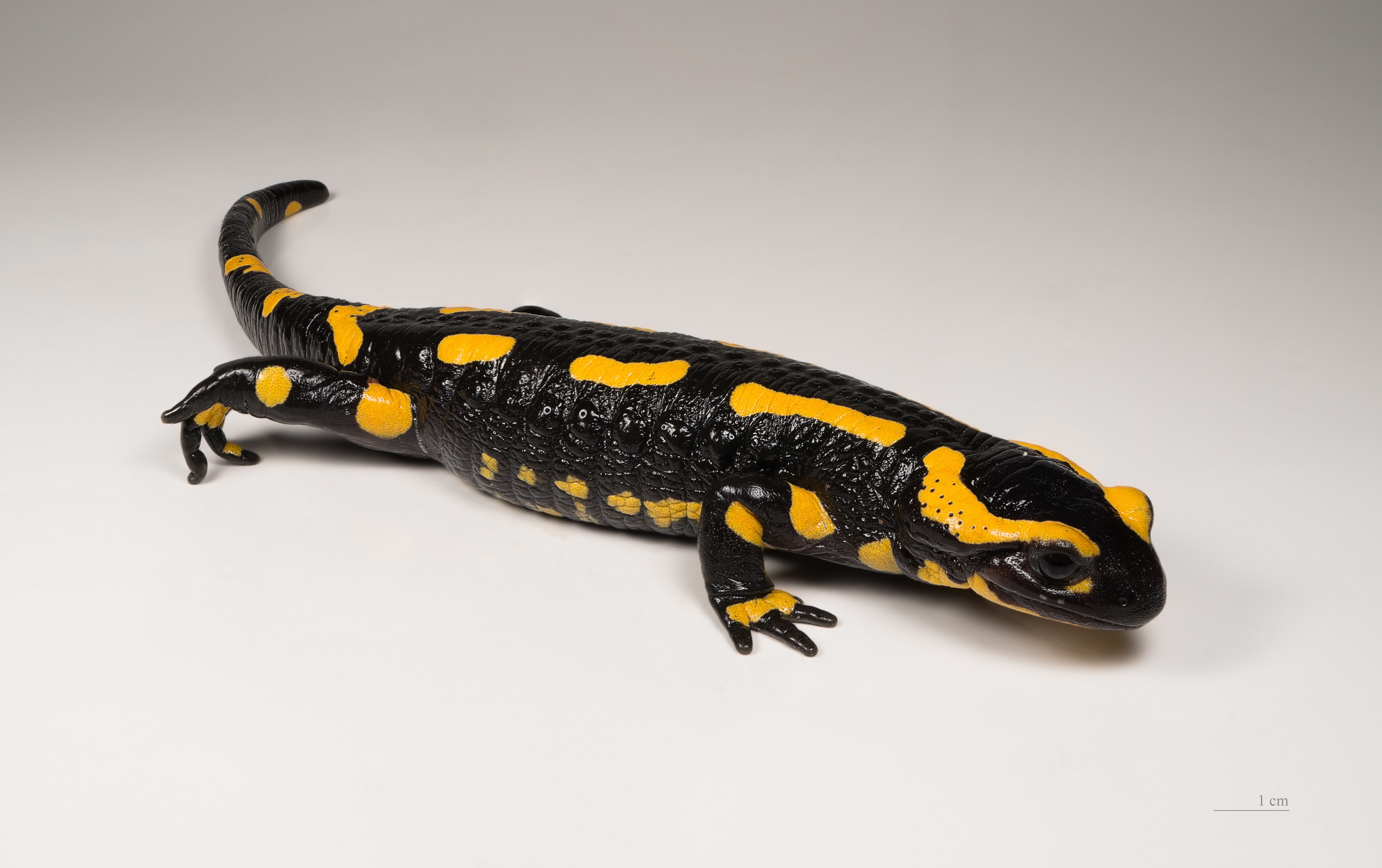
spotted salamander

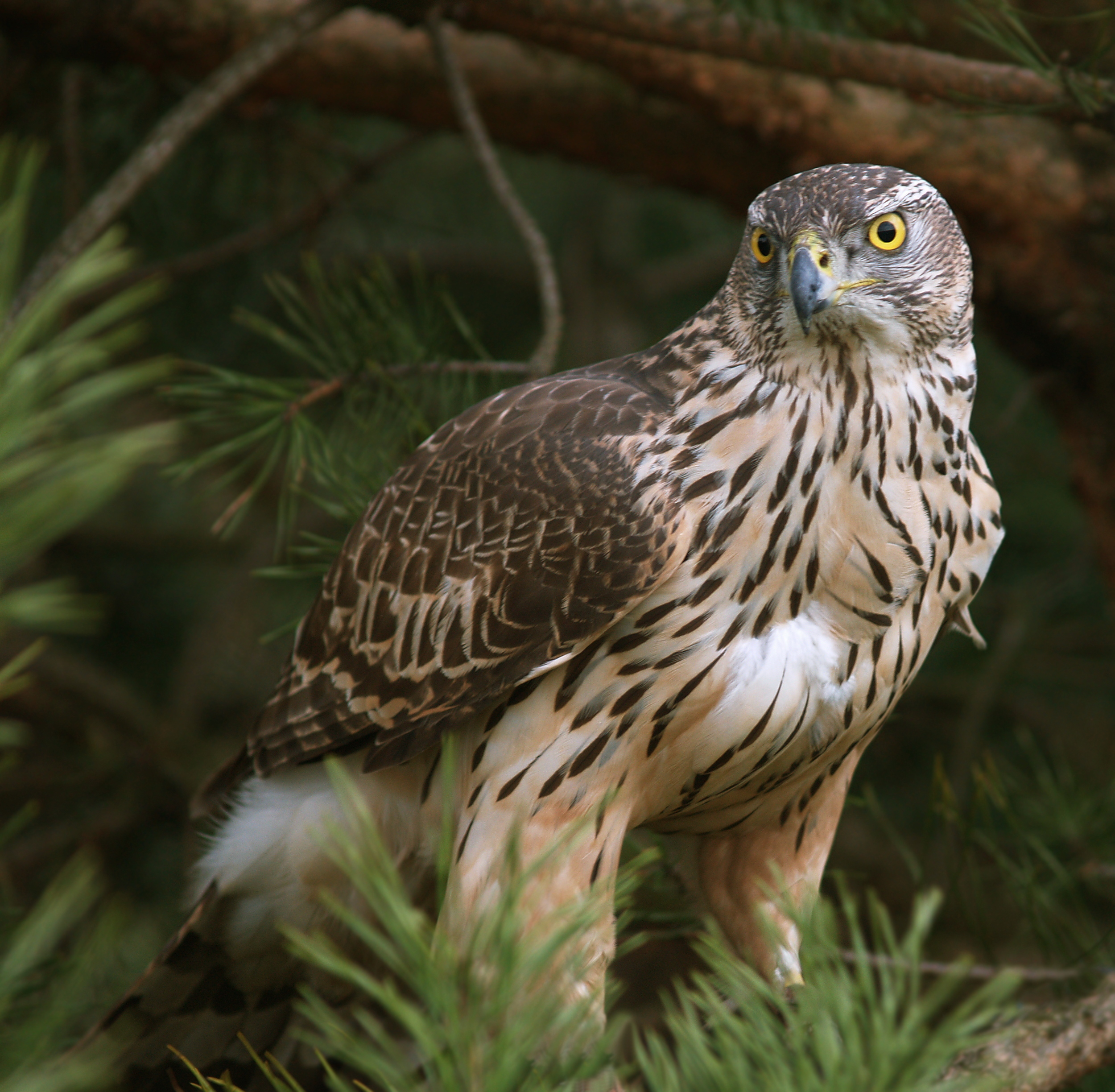
goshawk

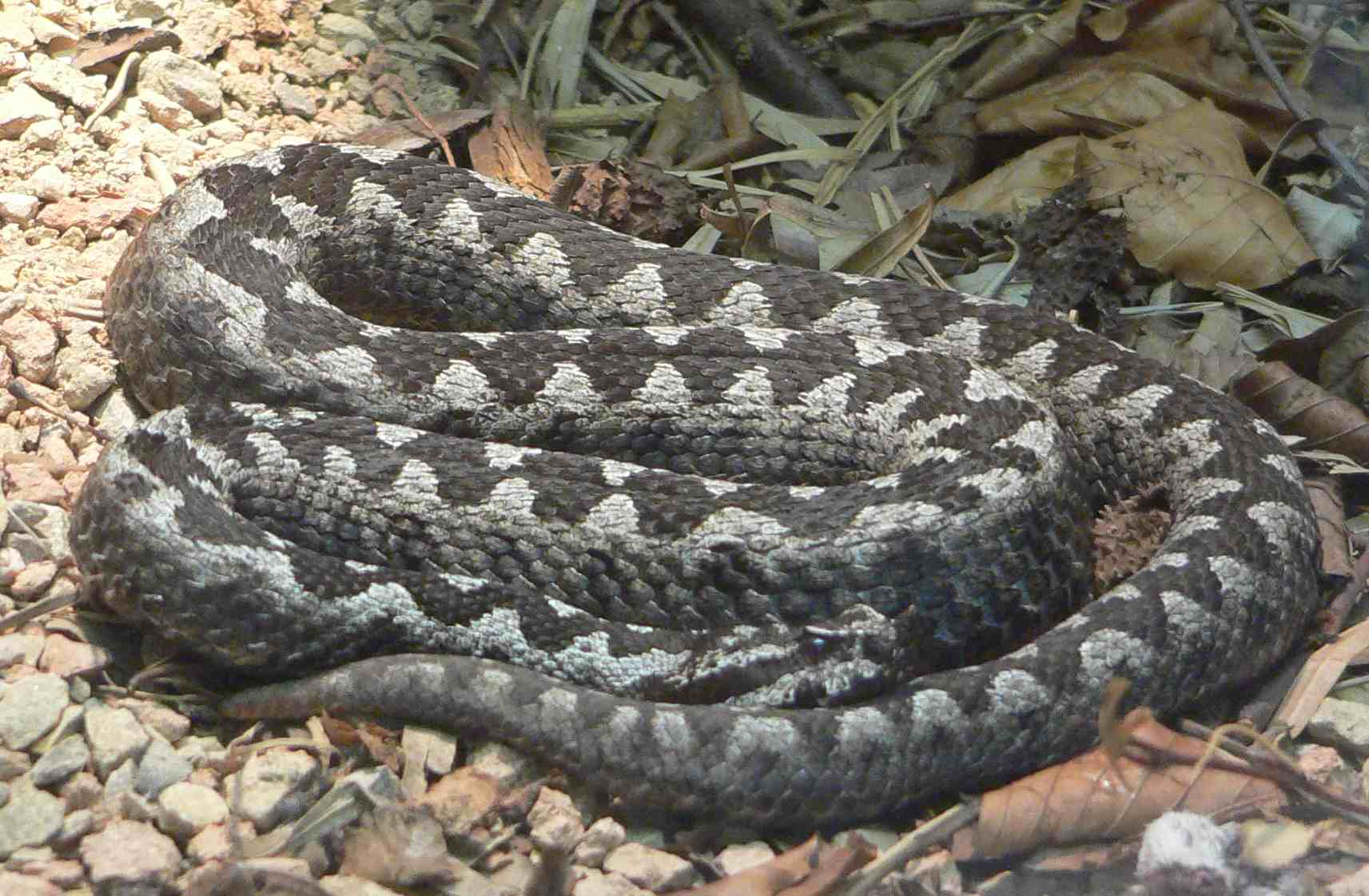
Vipera ammodytes

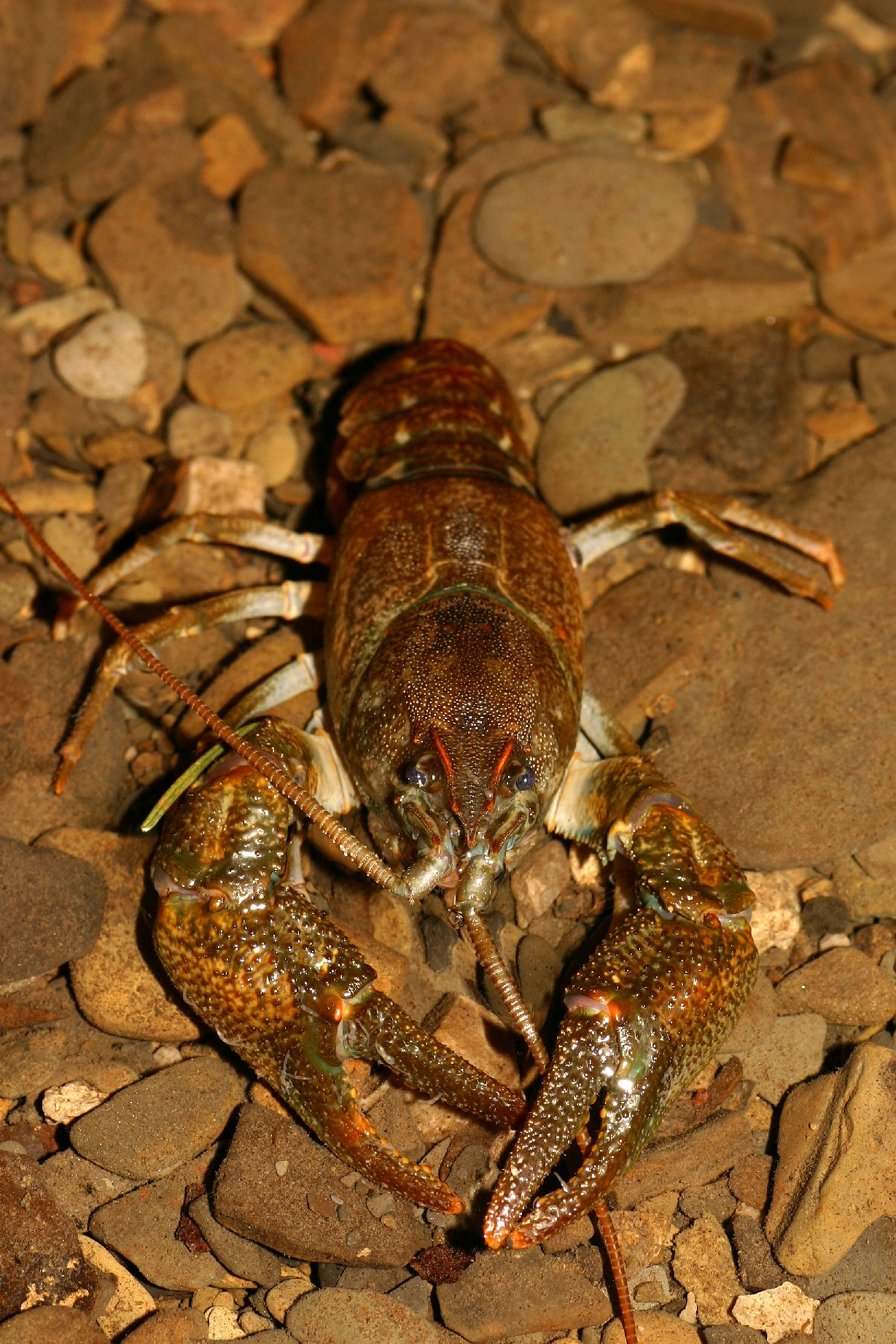
Austropotamobius torrentium

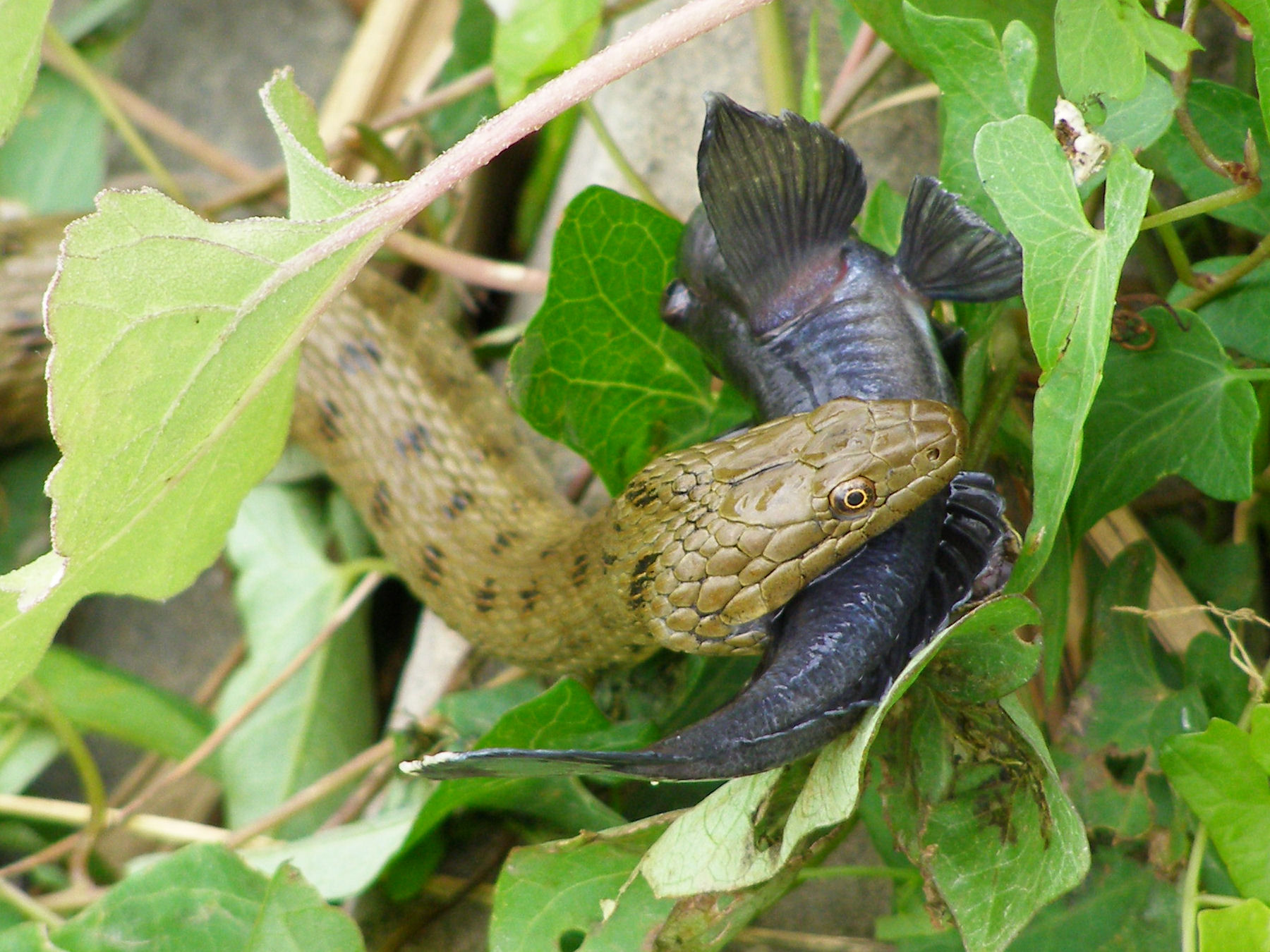
The dice snake

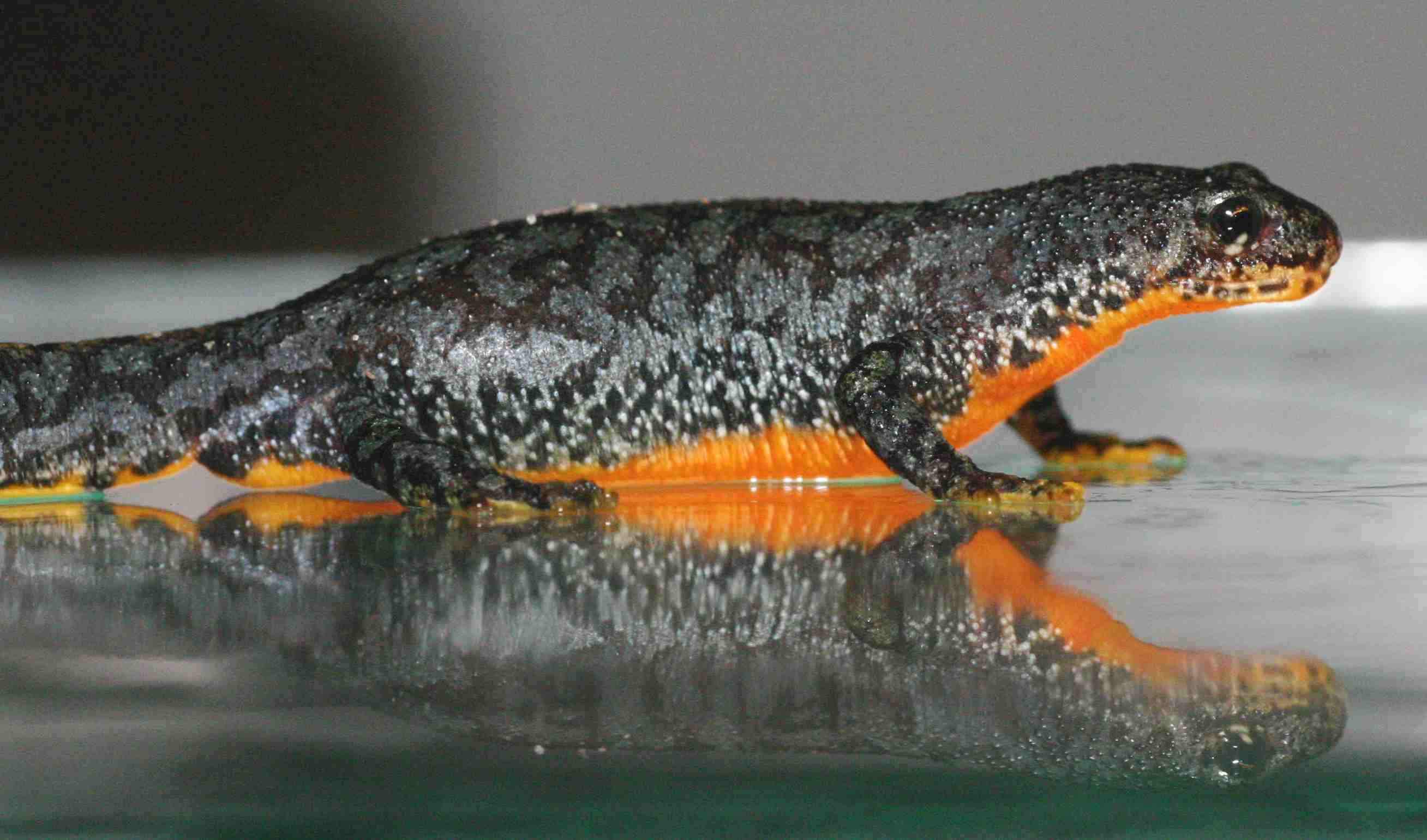
Mesotriton aplestris

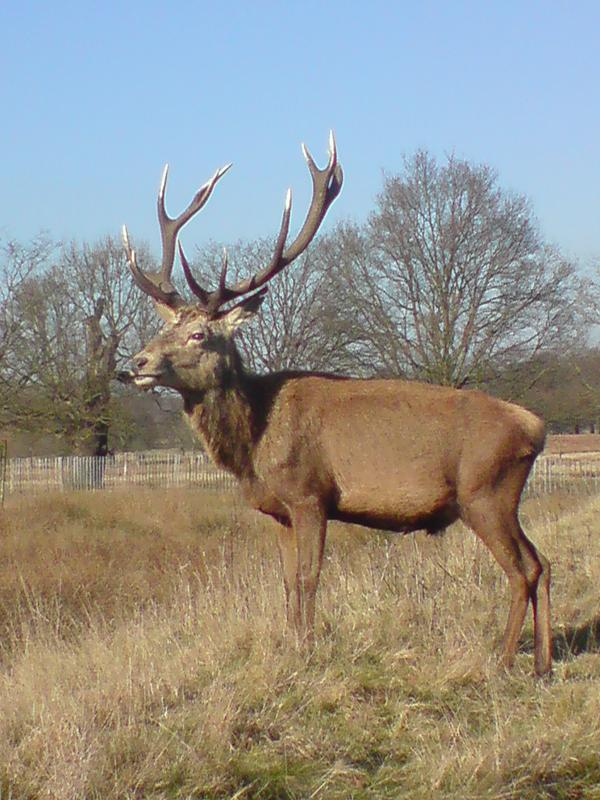
Red deer

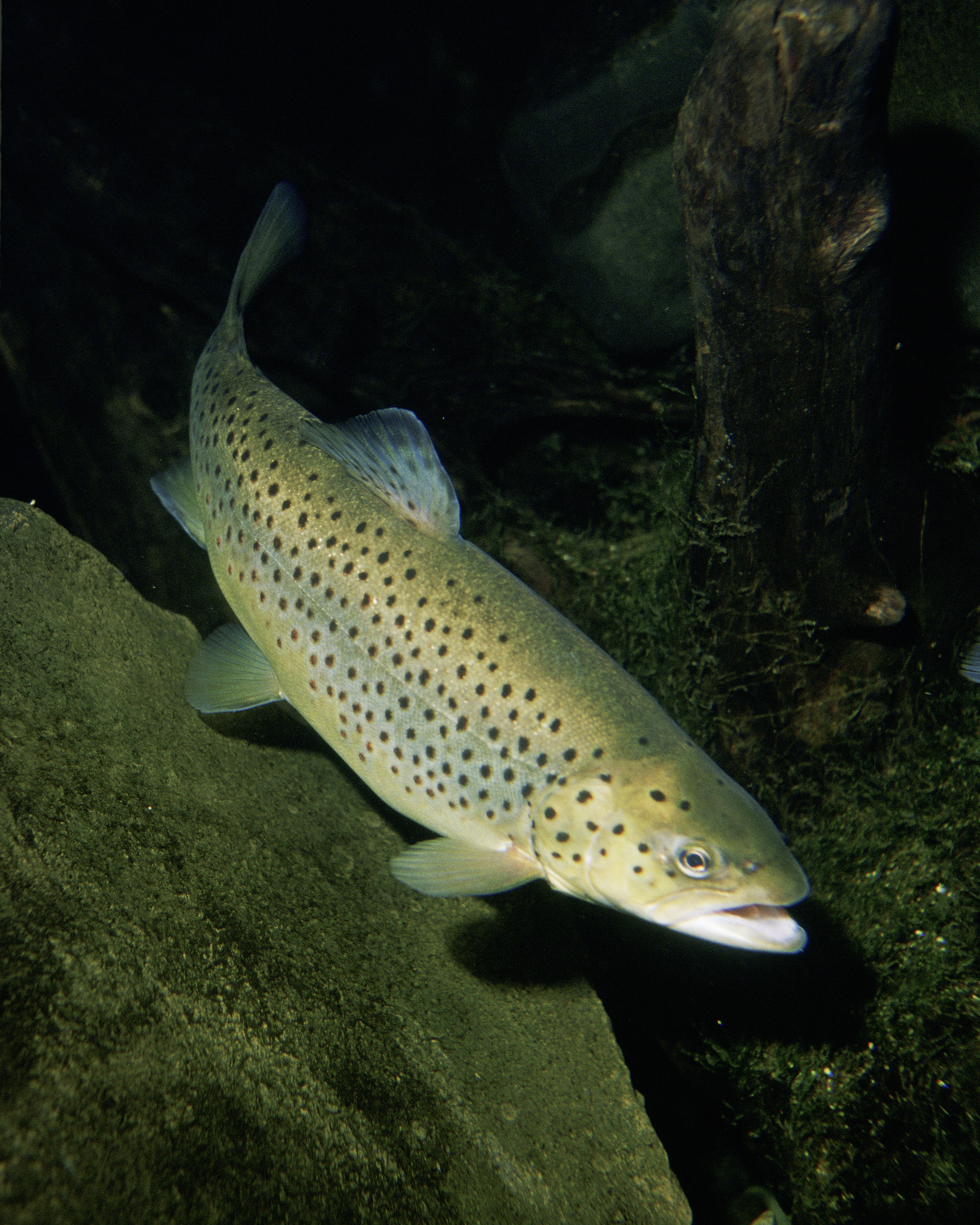
Brown trout

== History ==
=== Prehistoric times ===
==== Eneolithic ====
The earliest artefacts in the Žumberak Mountains, small axe, and fragments of a pot, were found in the village of Mrzlo Polje Žumberačko. They belong to the people of Baden culture (Lasinya culture).

==== Iron Age ====
There is a large archaeological survey in Budinjak. Large settlement and a necropolis with 140 tumuli were discovered. One of the most important findings is bronze, Kneževa kaciga (Prince's Helmet), found in one of two biggest tumuli, with diameter of 19 meters 19 m (62 ft). Today it is in Archaeological Museum in Zagreb. This is a proof that Budinjak was a settlement with powerful economy which had contacts with faraway lands.

In late Iron Age, the Celtic tribes started conquering and colonizing this part of Europe. It is presumed that they had many settlements in the Žumberak Mountains, since mint was discovered in Samobor. Under the Okić Castle, in the forest of Jama near Podgrađe, a man found 1600 silver Celtic coins. These coins are now called Samobors.

=== Roman period ===
In 35 - 33 BC the Žumberak Mountains became part of the Roman Republic, later empire, province of Pannonia. The most important remains are several graveyards dating from 1st century AD found in the central Žumberak Mountains, in villages of Gornja Vas and Bratelji. People buried in those graveyards belonged to the Celtic tribe of Latobics. Many glass containers were found in these graves. These containers were produced in northern Italy, and they are proof that people in the Žumberak Mountains had a powerful economy at that time.

=== Middle Ages ===
After the decline of the Roman Empire, numerous Germanic and Slavic tribes passed across the Pannonian Plain. Almost nothing is known when the Croats came to the Žumberak Mountains. The earliest written texts and archaeological finds enlighten the history of the Žumberak Mountains from the 12th century on. At that time the Žumberak Mountains were the border between the Croatian-Hungarian Kingdom and the Holy Roman Empire.

=== Early modern period ===
Colonization of Žumberak with Vlachs and Uskoks begins 1526. Between the late 12th or early 13th century and 1746, the region was more or less formally part of the Duchy of Carniola within the Holy Roman Empire. The state assembly of Carniola unsuccessfully demanded the region back in the 1860s.

=== Uskoks ===
The isolated region on the Croatian side has always had a low population. In 1530, the immigration of Uskoks started, which lasted until the 17th century, which brought a large population of Štokavian speakers to the region. The Žumberak Mountains were then part of Austrian Military Frontier, created by the Habsburgs to serve as a defensive buffer between their empire and the Ottoman Empire. Uskoks from this area, were the only military personnel on the Military frontier, that weren't living close to the border itself, the Žumberak Mountains themselves were an enclave within Banovina and did not directly border the Ottoman Empire, so they had to walk for half a day or longer to their posts in Ogulin, Cazin, Bihać etc. 500 Uskoks from the Žumberak Mountains fought in the Battle of Sisak. They had huge losses for their standard, losing 40 soldiers in crucial mission of taking over the bridge over Odra river. In the year 1545. they were called by citizens of Zagreb, to defend the city from the Ottomans because the regular army under the leadership of Croatian Ban was heavily defeated in Hrvatsko Zagorje. As we know Zagreb was never occupied by the Ottomans.

In the 16th century, Žumberak became a part of the Austrian Military Frontier, with its own Žumberak Great Capitanate (Croatian: Veliki kapetan). Known captains include:

1. Ivan Pichler (1534)
2. Bartol Raunach (1540–1543)
3. Ivan Vernek (1543)
4. Ivan Lenković (1546–1550)
5. Ivan Špalatin Alberti (1558)
6. Gašpar Rab (1564)
7. Jobst Josip Turn (1572)
8. Vuk Engelbert Auersperg (1579–1584)
9. Péter Erdődy (1592)
10. Krištof Obričan (1600)
11. Nikola Gregorianec (1602)
12. Hans Ulrich von Eggenberg (1611)
13. Ernst von Paradeiser (1622)
14. Hans von Paradeiser (1622)
15. Rudolf von Paradeiser (1630, †1647)
16. Petar IV Zrinski (1647–1659)
17. Juraj V Frankopan (1659, †1661)
18. Hans Ernst von Paradeiser (1665–1687)
19. Ferd. Herberstei (1690), in absentia
20. Ivan Vilim Kuschlan (1619–1711)
21. Baron Posarelli (1714)
22. Ernst Kulmer (1732)
23. Benvenuto Petazzi (1737)

==== Language ====
Because of the immigration of Uskoks, the region is the intersection of all three Croatian dialects. The descendants of Uskoks who are Štokavian speakers are the majority in the Žumberak Mountains. On the Slovenian side, dialects of the Slovene Lower Carniolan group are spoken. Between 1882 and 1888, the Slovene writer and teacher Janez Trdina published a collection of folk tales based on material he had collected among the Slovenes of the Gorjanci, titled Tales and Legends of the Gorjanci (Slovene: Bajke in povesti o Gorjancih).

=== Mass emigrations ===
Mass emigrations started in the 19th century, when Military frontier was disestablished. People in the Žumberak Mountains were no longer needed in the army. Since army salaries, which were main source of wealth, were not coming any more to the Žumberak Mountains. This was the main reason why people fell to poverty and started immigrating to the United States.

=== World War II ===
World War II in Yugoslavia began on 6 April 1941 with the invasion by Nazi Germany. Soon after that, the Croatian part of the Žumberak Mountains became a part of the Independent State of Croatia (NDH), a World War II puppet state of Nazi Germany and Italy, with the western part being directly occupied by Italy. The Slovenian part was annexed directly to the Third Reich. The resistance movement in the Žumberak Mountains began when Partisans from 1st Zagreb Partisan Detachment came to this area. Matija Gubec Partisan detachment was established here in August 1941, However it was quickly destroyed. In 1942 partisans from Kordun managed to attract local people to join the resistance, so in 1942 Žumberak-Pokuplje partisan detachment was established. Later they merged with First Croatian proleterian battalion in famous XIII. proletarian brigade Rade Končar. That brigade managed to liberate Krašić in January 1943, which was a great victory for Partisan movement, since North-West Croatia was considered to be NDH stronghold. Many villages were completely burned and destroyed by the fascists, because their inhabitants allegedly helped the partisans. Žumberak was finally liberated on 9 May 1945, by the 10th division of Yugoslav People's Army.

The Žumberak Mountains are the site of the Jazovka Pit, location of a World War II massacre of retreating Ustasha soldiers and civilians mostly from hospitals in Zagreb by the communists, not partisans from Žumberak-Pokuplje partisan detachment, or local people.

=== In SFRY ===
In the nineteen-sixties and nineteen-seventies, the second mass emigration started, mostly to Germany. Žumberak-Gorjanci memorial area was established in 1971.

=== Modern Croatia ===
In 1991 area of the Žumberak Mountains became a part of independent Croatia and Slovenia. A military complex near the top of Trdina Peak, created by the Yugoslav People's Army, has been a subject of a dispute between the two new countries since the 1990s because it is held by the Slovenian army, but the complex is actually located on Croatian soil. Escalation was prevented due to amicable diplomacy. Specifically, on 29 June 2017, the Arbitration Tribunal of the Permanent Court of Arbitration decided in a verdict that Sveta Gera belonged to Croatia but that the country could not order Slovenian soldiers to withdraw from the complex.

== Mountain huts ==
In the 1935–1936 season, the Šoićeva kuća mountain hut below Japetić at 364 metres (1,194 ft) in elevation, open year-round, saw 1595 visitors. In the 1936–1937 season, it saw 2121 visitors, including 2 Czechoslovak and 2 Austrian citizens. In the 1937–1938 season the Lipovački dom below Japetić saw 1429 visitors, including 2 Polish and 1 German citizens.

== Conservation and threats ==
The greatest threats to the range are deforestation and illegal dumping. Some argue that the Krško Nuclear Power Plant threatens the northern parts of the range, but there is no proof of this. Most of the Croatian part of the range was protected as the Žumberak–Samoborsko Gorje Nature Park by the Parliament of Croatia on 28 May 1999, and since 2012 it has been a Natura 2000 site. Some areas inside the park itself are specially protected.

== List of protected areas ==
=== Croatia ===
- Nature park Žumberak-Samoborsko gorje
  - Significant landscape Slapnica
  - Significant landscape Okić
  - Special nature reserve (forest) Japetić
- Nature monument Grgos cave
- Park-forest Tepec and Stražnik
- Special botanical reserve Smerovišće
- Natura 2000 Vugrin cave

=== Slovenia ===
- Natura 2000 Gorjanci-Radoha
- Ecologically important area (EPO) Gorjanci
- Nature reserve of old-growth forest at Trdina Peak
- Nature reserve of old-growth forest at Ravna Gora
- Natural value of national important Kobila

== Gallery ==
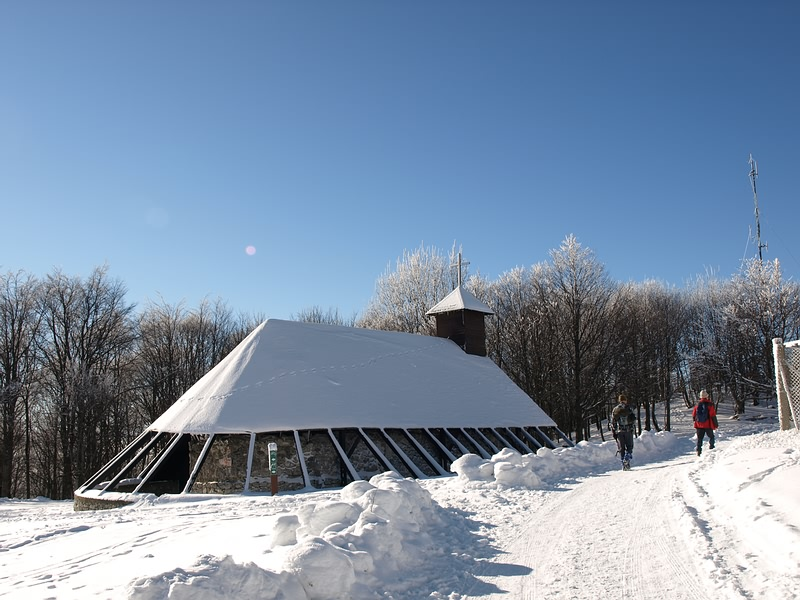
St. Elijah chapel on Sveta Gera

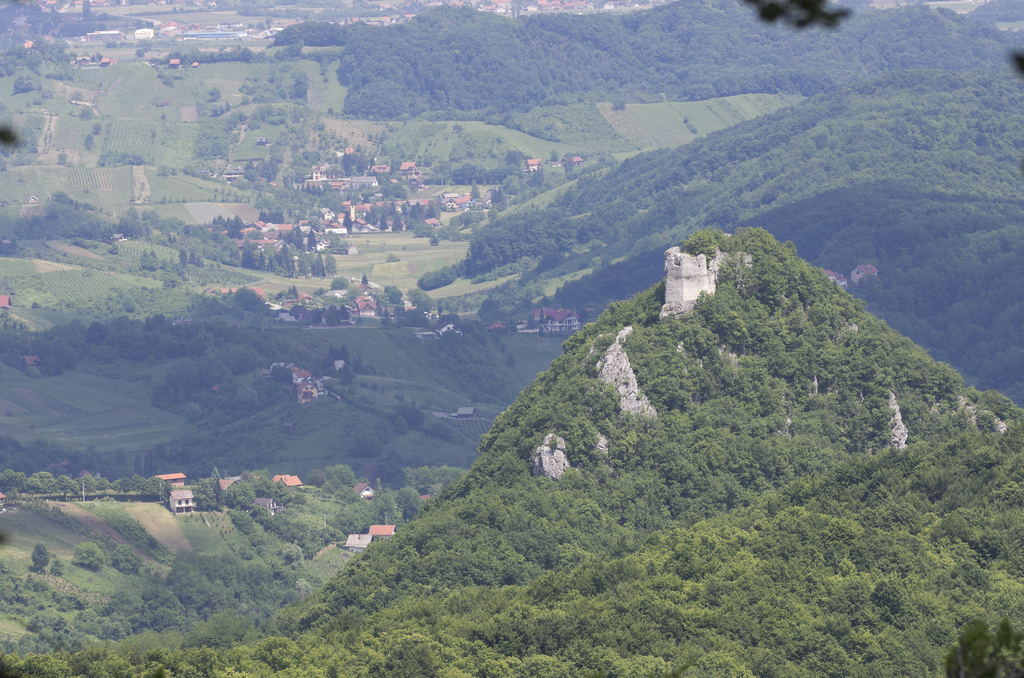
Okić

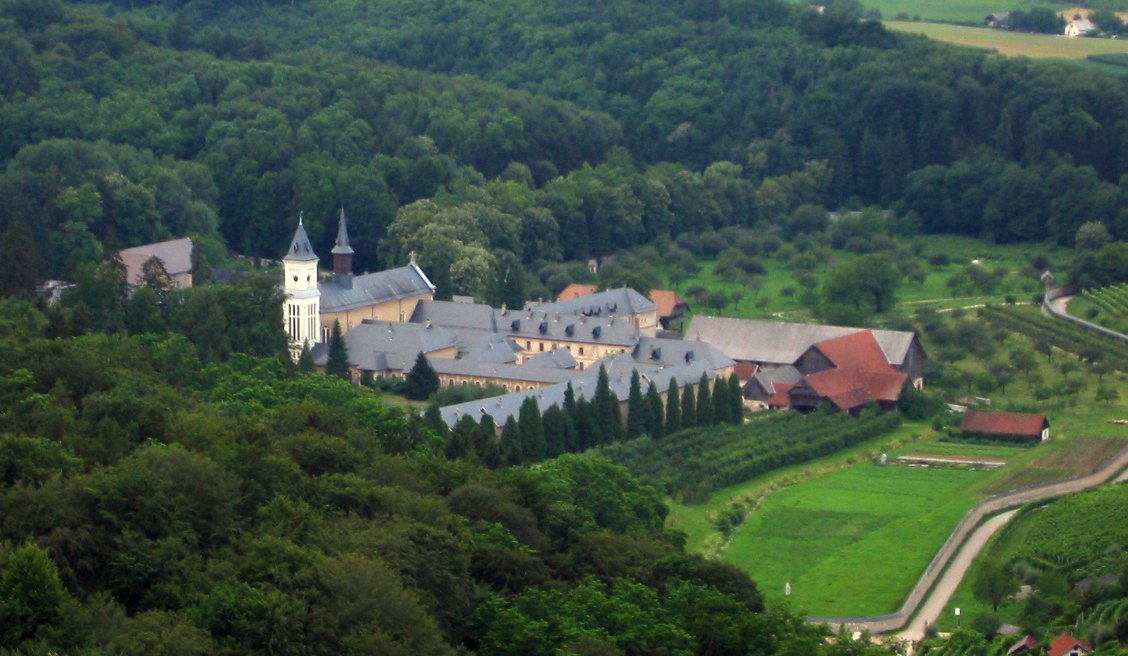
Pleterje Charterhouse, Carthusian monastery

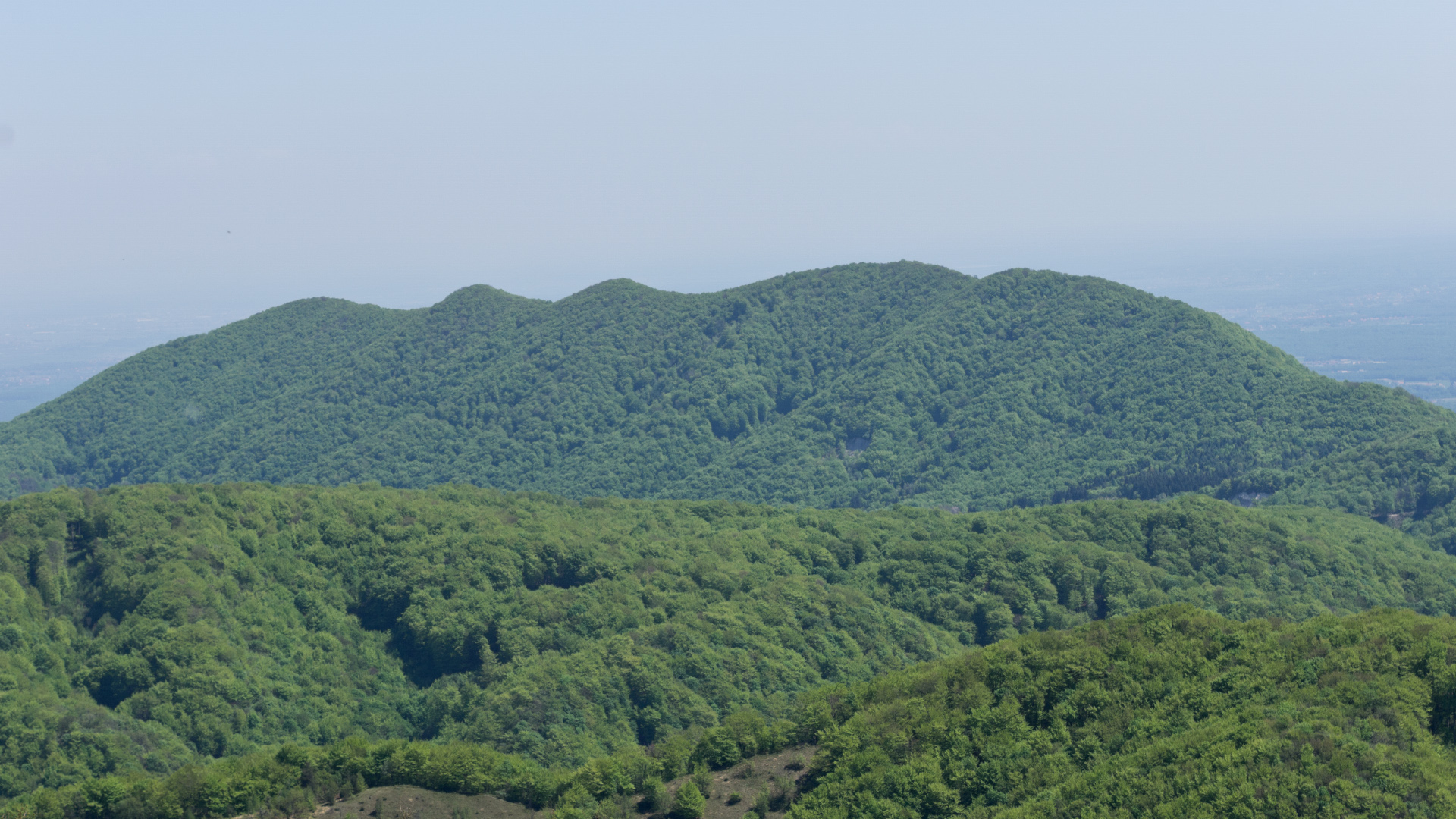
Plešivica, view from Japetić

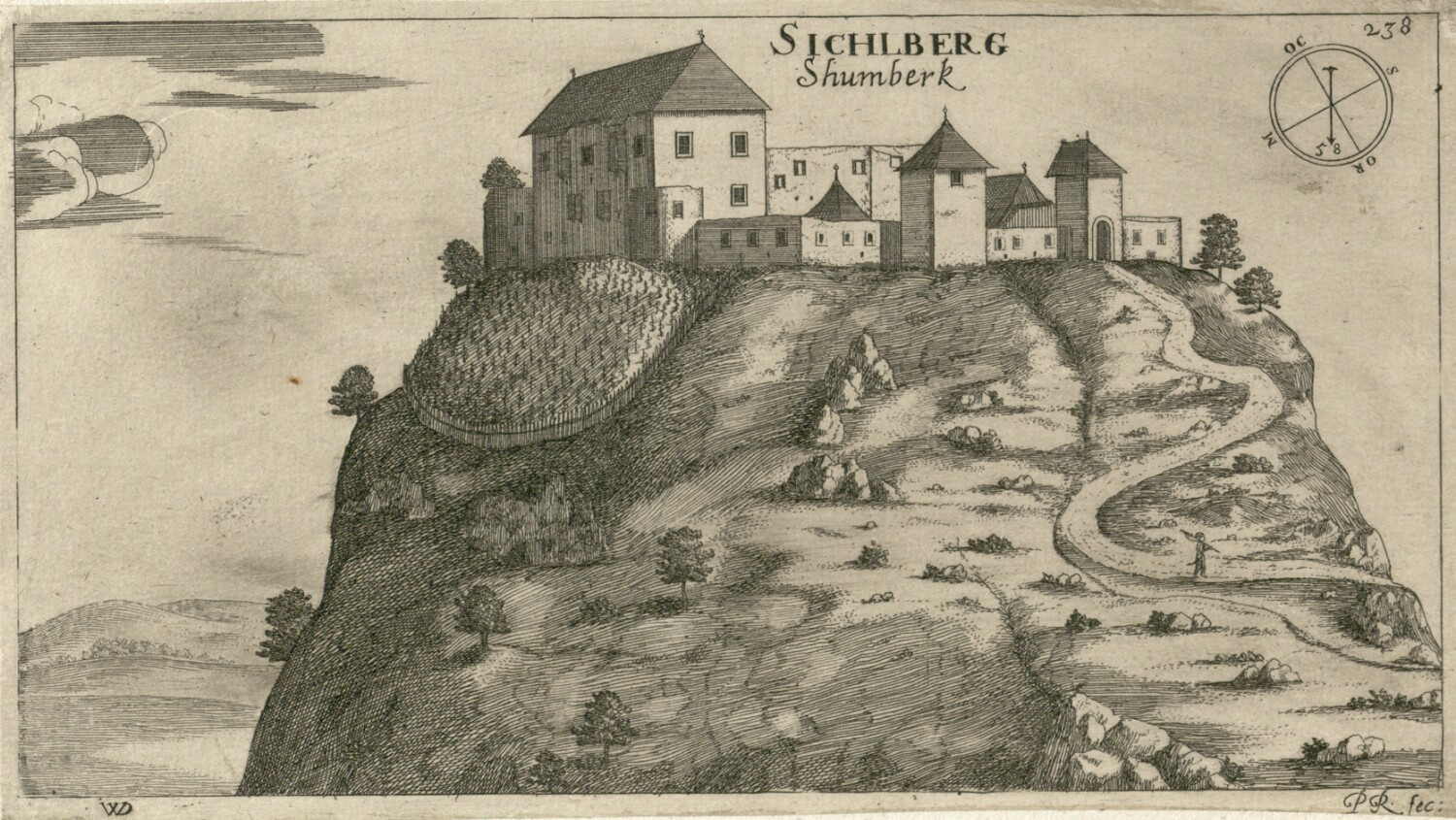
Sichelberg, fortress from 13th century

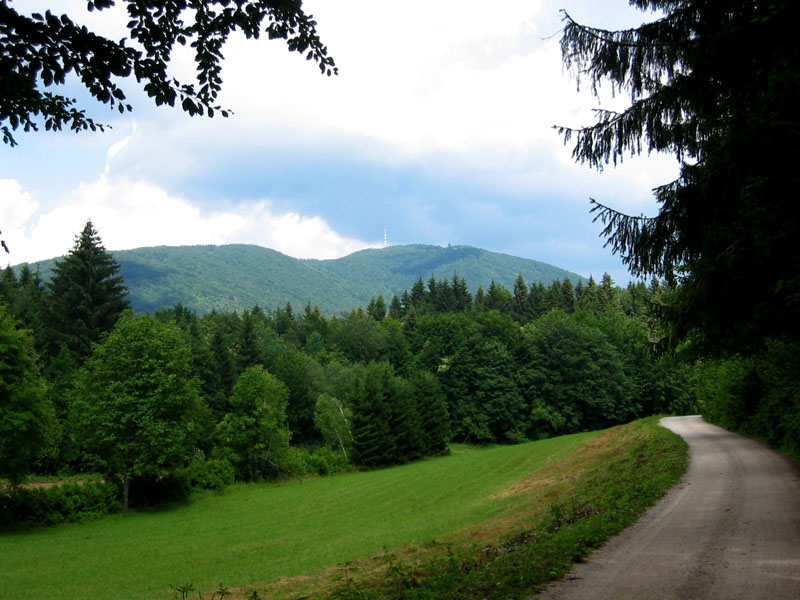
View towards Sveta Gera

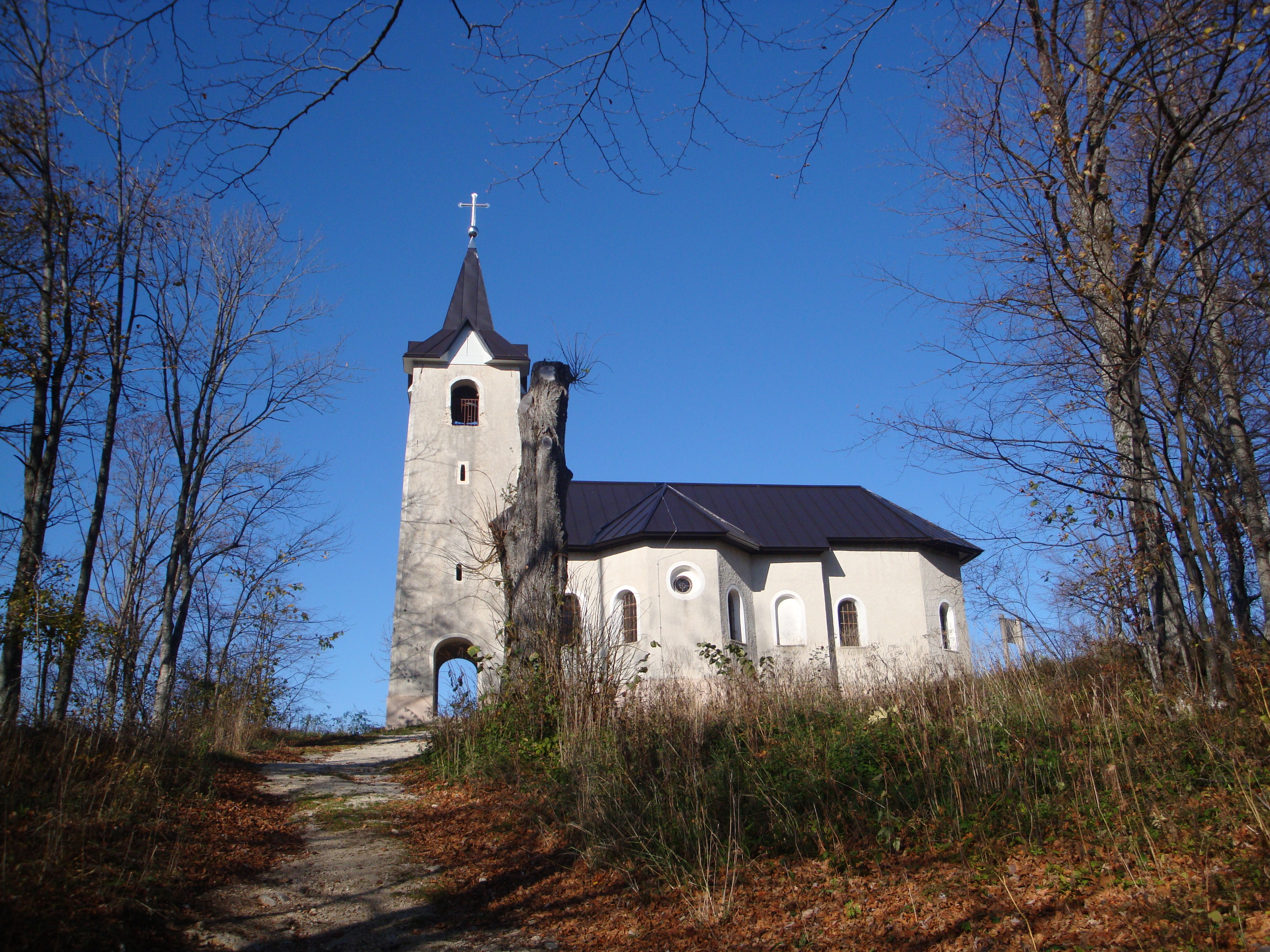
St. Nicholas church in Gorjanci

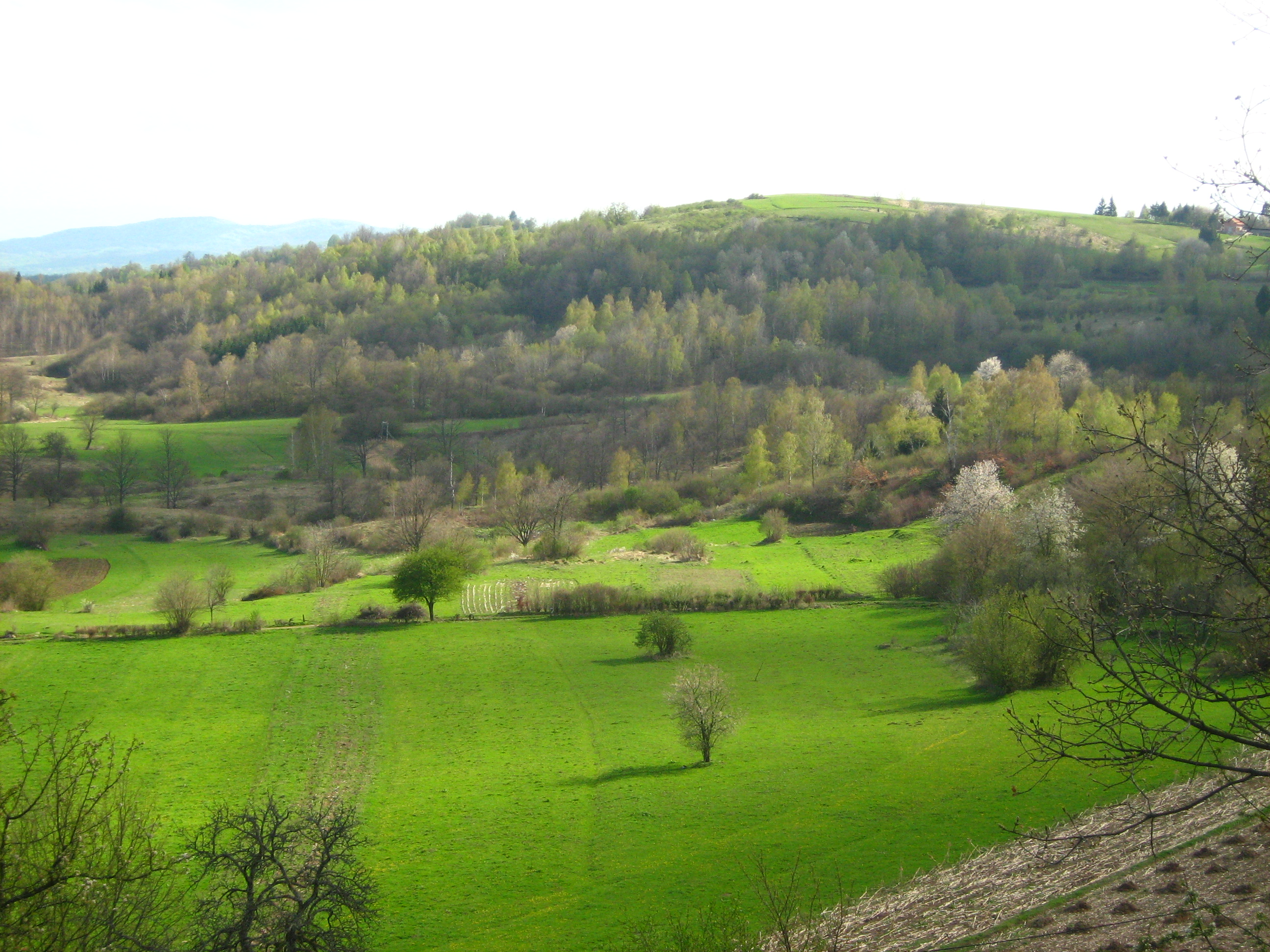
southern part of Mrzlo polje

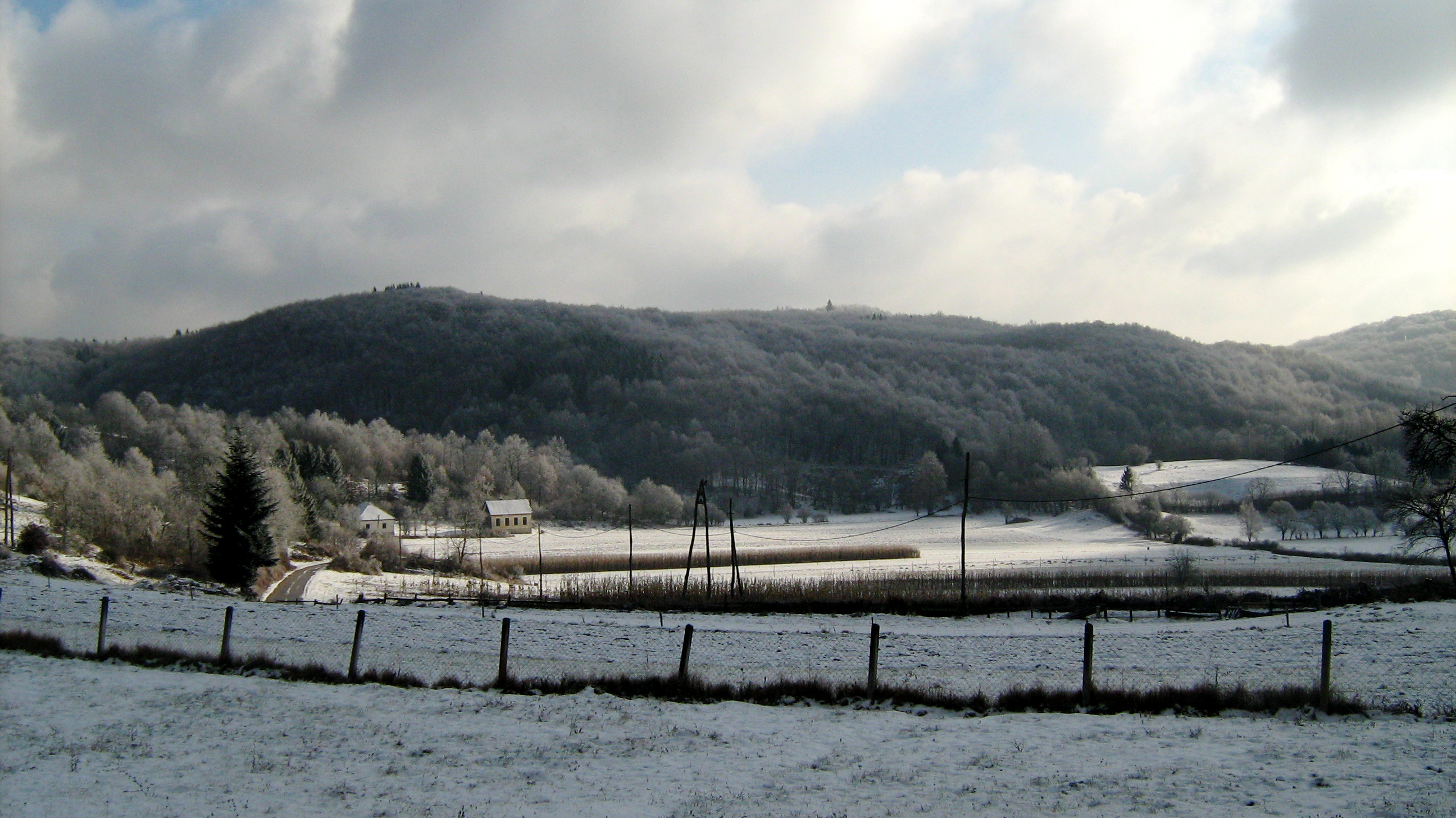
Mrzlo Polje

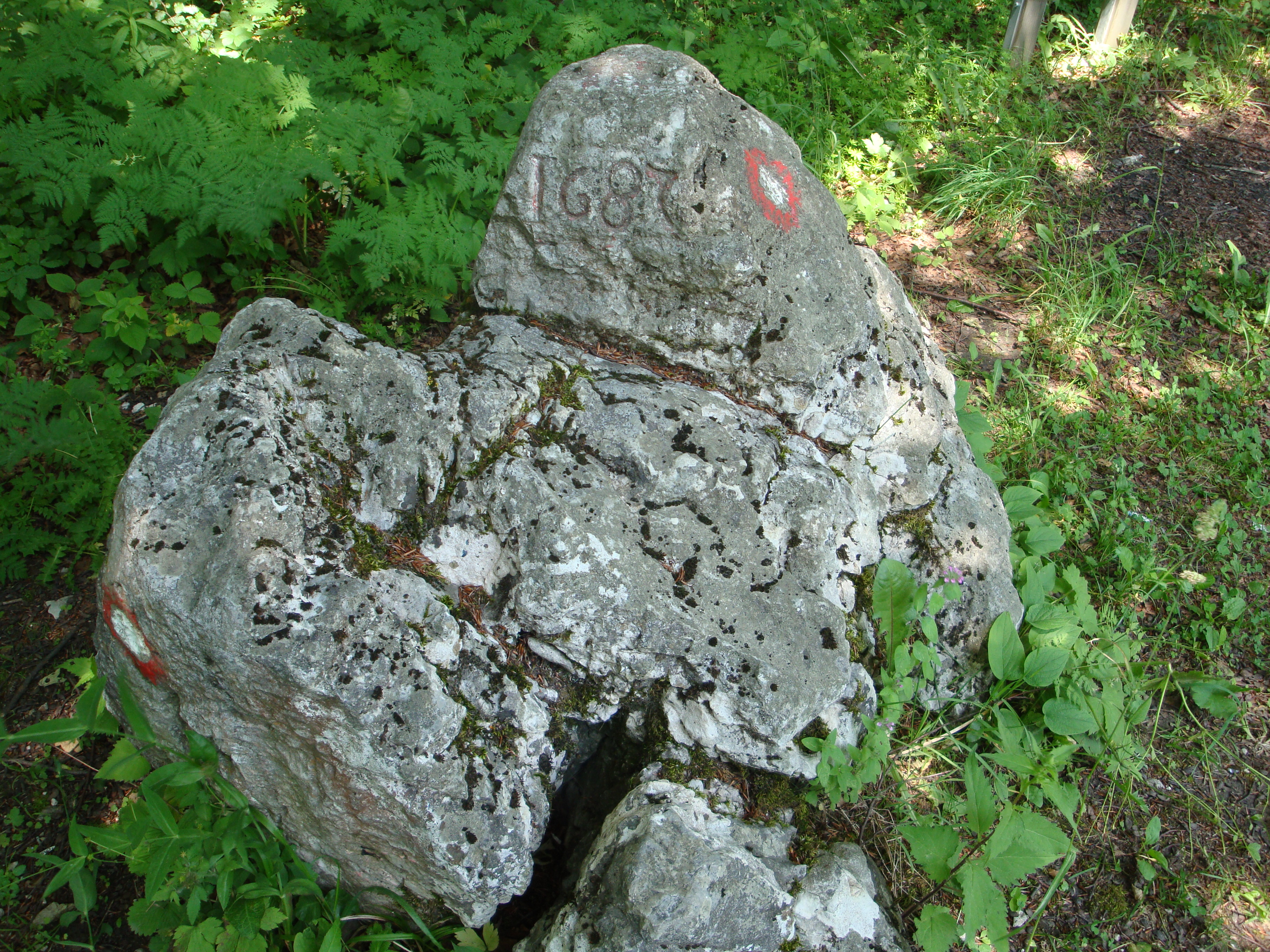
Blood stone (Krvavi kamen)

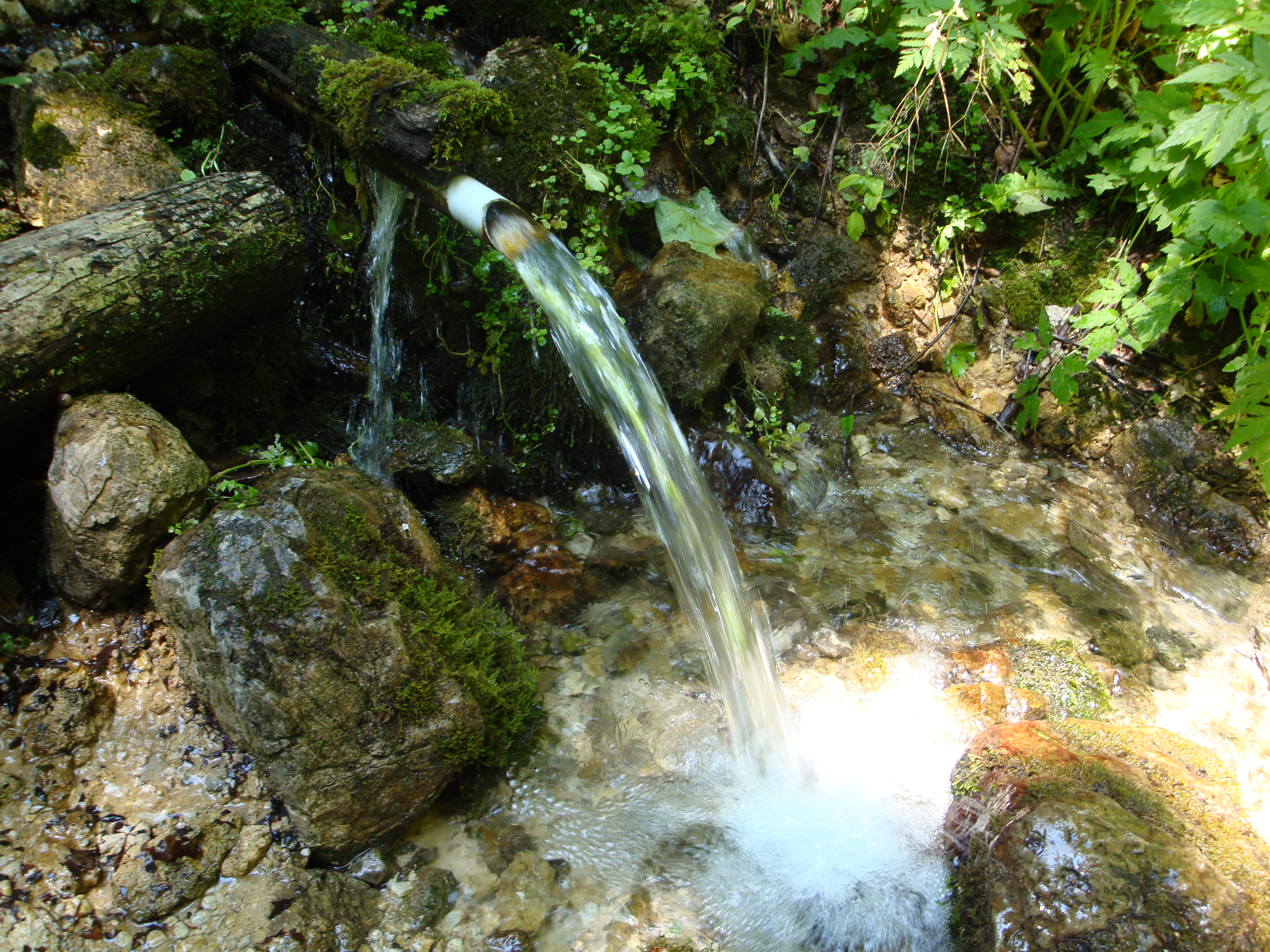
Minutnik spring

== Bibliography ==
=== Alpinism ===
- Poljak, Željko (February 1959). "Samoborsko gorje". Kazalo za "Hrvatski planinar" i "Naše planine" 1898—1958 (PDF). Naše planine. Vol. XI. pp. 7–8. ISSN 0354-0650.
- Poljak, Željko (February 1959). "Žumberačko gorje". Kazalo za "Hrvatski planinar" i "Naše planine" 1898—1958 (PDF). Naše planine. Vol. XI. p. 8. ISSN 0354-0650.

=== Biology ===
- Šašić, Martina; Nahirnić, Ana; Tarmann, Gerhard M. (2016-12-31). "Zygaenidae (Lepidoptera) in the Lepidoptera collections of the Croatian Natural History Museum". Natura Croatica: Periodicum Musei Historiae Naturalis Croatici. 25 (2): 233–248. doi:10.20302/NC.2016.25.19. eISSN 1848-7386.

=== Geology ===
- Lozić, Sanja; Fuerst-Bjeliš, Borna; Perica, Dražen (2006-06-01). "Quantitative-geomorphological and Environmental-historical Impact of the Ecological Soil Depth; Northwestern Croatia". Hrvatski geografski glasnik. 68 (1): 7–25. doi:10.21861/HGG.2006.68.01.01. eISSN 1848-6401.
