= Cernik, Zagreb County =

Settlement in Žumberak, Croatia

Cernik
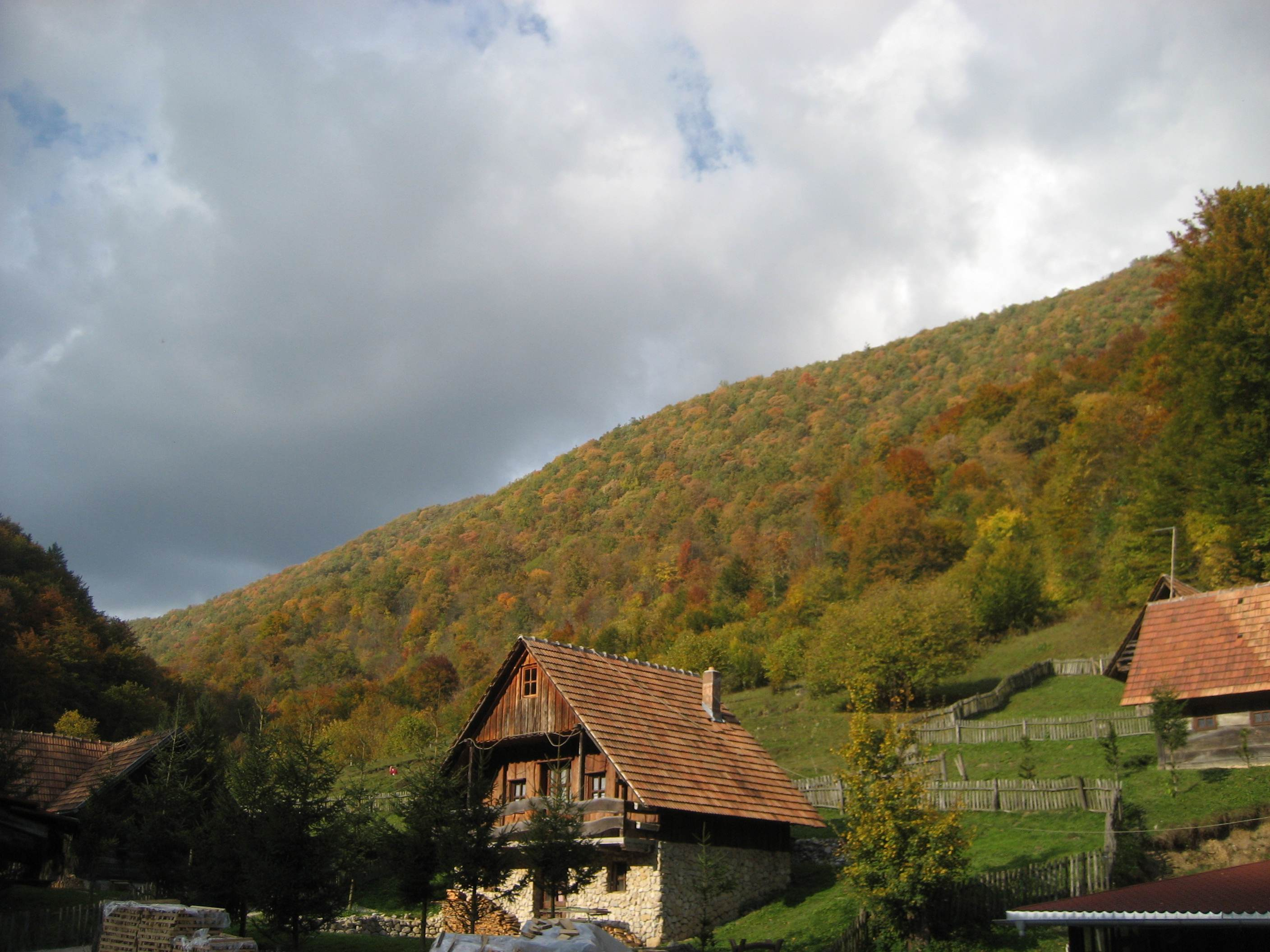

- Location within Croatia
- Coordinates: 45°42′N 15°28′E
- Country: Croatia
- County: Zagrebačka županija
- Municipality: Žumberak

Area
  - Total: 1.6 km^{2} (0.62 sq mi)

Population (2021)
  - Total: 5
  - Density: 3.1/km^{2} (8.1/sq mi)
- Time zone: Central European Time
- Postal code: 10455
- Area code: (+385) 10

Cernik is a settlement in the municipality of Žumberak, Zagreb County, Croatia. The population is 11 (census 2011). In 1835, Cernik had 8 houses and 73 residents.

Cernik is a traditionally preserved settlement and a valuable architectural heritage, near Sošice. Cernik was mentioned in historical documents for the first time in 1249 in Bernard's gift book.
