= Slavoj Žižek bibliography =

The philosopher and cultural theorist Slavoj Žižek is a prolific writer who has published in numerous languages.

== Books ==
=== English ===
Title	Year	Publisher	ISBN	Notes
Liberal Fascisms	2026	Bloomsbury	9781350573161	Essays Series: Vol. 3
Quantum History: A New Materialist Philosophy	2025	Bloomsbury	9781350566439	
Zero Point	2025	Bloomsbury	9781350537842	Essays Series: Vol. 2
Against Progress	2024	Bloomsbury	9781350515857	Essays Series: Vol. 1
Christian Atheism: How To Be A Real Materialist	2024	Bloomsbury	9781350409323	
Too Late to Awaken: What Lies Ahead When There is no Future?	2023	Allen Lane	978-0241651759	
Freedom: A Disease Without Cure	2023	Bloomsbury	978-1350357129	
Surplus-Enjoyment: A Guide For The Non-Perplexed	2022	Bloomsbury	978-1-350-22626-5	
Heaven in Disorder	2021	OR Books	978-1-68219-283-2	
Pandemic! 2: Chronicles of a Time Lost	2020	OR Books	978-1-68219-409-6	
Pandemic!: COVID-19 Shakes the World	2020	OR Books	978-84-339-4181-7	
A Left that Dares to Speak Its Name: 34 Untimely Interventions	2020	Polity	978-1509541188	
Hegel in A Wired Brain	2020	Bloomsbury		
Sex and the Failed Absolute	2019	Bloomsbury		
The Relevance of the Communist Manifesto	2019	Polity		
Like a Thief in Broad Daylight: Power in the Era of Post-Humanity	2018	Allen Lane		
Incontinence of the Void: Economico-Philosophical Spandrels	2017	MIT Press		
The Courage of Hopelessness: Chronicles of a Year of Acting Dangerously	2017	Penguin Books		
Antigone	2016	Bloomsbury		
Disparities	2016	Bloomsbury		
Against the Double Blackmail: Refugees, Terror and Other Troubles with the Neighbours	2016	Allen Lane		
The Wagnerian Sublime: Four Lacanian Readings of Classic Operas	2016	August Verlag Berlin		
Trouble in Paradise: From the End of History to the End of Capitalism	2014	Allen Lane		
Absolute Recoil: Towards a New Foundation of Dialectical Materialism	2014	Verso Books		
Event: A Philosophical Journey Through a Concept	2014	Penguin Books		
The Most Sublime Hysteric: Hegel with Lacan	2014	Polity		
The Year of Dreaming Dangerously	2012	Verso Books		
Less Than Nothing: Hegel and the Shadow of Dialectical Materialism	2012	Verso Books		
Living in the End Times	2010	Verso Books		
First As Tragedy, Then As Farce	2009	Verso Books		
Violence: Six Sideways Reflections	2008	Picador		
In Defense of Lost Causes	2008	Verso Books		
How to Read Lacan	2006	Granta Books	978-1862078949	
The Parallax View	2006	MIT Press		
Iraq: The Borrowed Kettle	2004	Verso Books		
The Puppet and the Dwarf: The Perverse Core of Christianity	2003	MIT Press		
Organs Without Bodies: On Deleuze and Consequences	2003	Routledge		
Welcome to the Desert of the Real: Five Essays on September 11 and Related Dates	2002	Verso Books		
On Belief	2001	Routledge		
The Fright of Real Tears: Krzysztof Kieślowski Between Theory and Post-Theory	2001	British Film Institute		
Did Somebody Say Totalitarianism?: Five Interventions in the (Mis)Use of a Notion	2001	Verso Books		
The Fragile Absolute: Or, Why is the Christian Legacy Worth Fighting For?	2000	Verso Books		
The Art of the Ridiculous Sublime: On David Lynch's Lost Highway	2000	Walter Chapin Simpson Center for the Humanities		
NATO As the Left Hand of God?	1999	Arkzin		
The Ticklish Subject: The Absent Centre of Political Ontology	1999	Verso Books		
The Spectre is Still Roaming Around: An Introduction to the 150th Anniversary Edition of The Communist Manifesto	1998	Arkzin		
The Plague of Fantasies	1997	Verso Books		
The Indivisible Remainder: Essays on Schelling and Related Matters	1996	Verso Books		
The Metastases of Enjoyment: Six Essays on Women and Causality	1994	Verso Books		
Tarrying with the Negative: Kant, Hegel, and the Critique of Ideology	1993	Duke University Press		
Enjoy Your Symptom!: Jacques Lacan in Hollywood and Out	1992	Routledge		
Looking Awry: An Introduction to Jacques Lacan through Popular Culture	1991	MIT Press		
For They Know Not What They Do: Enjoyment as a Political Factor	1991	Verso Books		
The Sublime Object of Ideology	1989	Verso Books	9781844673001	

==== As co-author, editor, etc. ====
Title	Year	Publisher with	ISBN	Notes
S/Ž | A European Manifesto	2022	Delere Press	978-981-18-1987-2	with Jeremy Fernando
Subject Lessons: Hegel, Lacan, and the Future of Materialism	2020	Northwestern University Press		edited by Russell Sbriglia and Slavoj Žižek
Reading Marx	2018	Polity		with Frank Ruda and Agon Hamza
In Defence of the Terror: Liberty or Death in the French Revolution	2016	Verso Books		with Sophie Wahnich
Comradely Greetings: The Prison Letters of Nadya and Slavoj	2014	Verso Books		with Nadya Tolokonnikova
Žižek's Jokes: Did You Hear the One about Hegel and Negation?	2014	MIT Press		text by Žižek; edited by Audun Mortensen; afterword by Momus
From Myth To Symptom: The Case of Kosovo	2013	KMD		with Agon Hamza
What Does Europe Want? - The Union and its Discontents	2013	Istros Books		with Srećko Horvat, translated in part by S. D Curtis-Kojakovic
The Idea of Communism 2: The New York Conference	2013	Verso Books		editor
Demanding the Impossible	2013	Polity		live interviews with Žižek, edited by Yong-june Park
God in Pain: Inversions of Apocalypse	2012	Seven Stories Press		with Boris Gunjević
Hegel and the Infinite: Religion, Politics, and Dialectic	2011	Columbia University Press		edited by Clayton Crockett, Slavoj Žižek, Creston Davis. Preface and chapter 12 written by Žižek
Philosophy in the Present	2010	Polity		with Alain Badiou
Paul's New Moment: Continental Philosophy and the Future of Christian Theology	2010	Brazos Press		with Creston Davis and John Milbank
The Idea of Communism	2010	Verso Books		texts from The Idea of Communism conference, 2009. edited by Žižek and Costas Douzinas
Mythology, Madness and Laughter: Subjectivity in German Idealism	2009	Continuum		with Markus Gabriel
The Monstrosity of Christ: Paradox or Dialectic?	2009	MIT Press		with Creston Davis and John Milbank
On Practice and Contradiction	2007	Verso Books		selected texts of Mao Zedong with introduction by Žižek
Terrorism and Communism	2007	Verso Books		selected texts of Leon Trotsky with introduction by Žižek
Virtue and Terror	2007	Verso Books		selected texts of Robespierre with introduction by Žižek
The Neighbor: Three Inquiries in Political Theology	2006	University of Chicago Press		with Eric Santner, and Keith Reinhard
Lacan: The Silent Partners	2006	Verso Books		editor
The Universal Exception: Selected Writings	2006	Bloomsbury		editor
Interrogating the Real: Selected Writings	2005	Continuum		texts by Žižek, edited by Rex Butler and Scott Stephens
On Eggs and Omelets	2005	Open Court Publishing		foreword to: Marxism and the Call of the Future: Conversations on Ethics, History, and Politics
Conversations with Žižek	2004	Polity		with Glyn Daly
Perversion and the Social Relation	2003	Duke University Press		co-edited with Molly Anne Rothenberg and Dennis Foster
Jacques Lacan: Critical Evaluations in Cultural Theory	2003	Routledge		editor
Revolution at the Gates: Zizek on Lenin, the 1917 Writings	2002	Verso Books		selected texts of V.I. Lenin with introduction by Žižek
Opera's Second Death	2001	Routledge		with Mladen Dolar
Contingency, Hegemony, Universality	2000	Verso Books		with Judith Butler and Ernesto Laclau
Cogito and the Unconscious	1998	Duke University Press		editor
The Abyss of Freedom: Ages of the World	1997	University of Michigan Press		essay by Žižek with Schelling's Die Welalter translated by Judith Norman
Mapping Ideology	1994	Verso Books		editor
Everything You Always Wanted to Know About Lacan... But Were Afraid to Ask Hitchcock	1993	Verso Books		editor
Beyond Discourse Analysis	1990	Verso Books		part of Ernesto Laclau's New Reflections on the Revolution of Our Time

=== Slovenian ===
Title	Year	Publisher	ISBN	Notes
Problemi 7-8, (Živeti in umreti v sprevrnjenem svetu)	2021	Društvo za teoretsko psihoanalizo, Ljubljana		
Začeti od začetka	2011	Cankarjeva založba, Ljubljana		edited by Peter Klepec
Badiou & Žižek: Hvalnica Ljubezni (Love and Terror)	2010	Društvo za teoretsko psihoanalizo, Ljubljana		
Problemi 4-5, (K definiciji komunistične kulture)	2010	Društvo za teoretsko psihoanalizo, Ljubljana		
Kako biti nihče	2005	Društvo za teoretsko psihoanalizo, Ljubljana		
Paralaksa: za politični suspenz etičnega	2004	Društvo za teoretsko psihoanalizo, Ljubljana		
Kuga Fantazem	2003	Društvo za teoretsko psihoanalizo, Ljubljana		
Strah pred pravimi solzami: Krzysztof Kieslowski in šiv	2001	Društvo za teoretsko psihoanalizo, Ljubljana		
Krhki absolut: Enajst tez o krščanstvu in marksizmu danes	2000	Društvo za teoretsko psihoanalizo, Ljubljana		
Alain Badiou, Sveti Pavel: Utemeljitev Univerzalnosti	1998	Društvo za teoretsko psihoanalizo, Ljubljana		afterword Alain Badiou as a Reader of Saint Paul
Argument za strpnost (Robert Schumann or romantic antihumanism)	1997	Društvo za teoretsko psihoanalizo, Ljubljana		
Slovenska smer	1996	Cankarjeva Založba, Ljubljana		
Problemi: Eseji 4-5	1994	Društvo za teoretsko psihoanalizo, Ljubljana		Film vpričo "vsesplošne težnje po ponižanju v ljubezenskem življenju"
Filozofija skoz psihoanalizo VII.	1993	Društvo za teoretsko psihoanalizo, Ljubljana		"Cogito as Sexual Difference David Lynch as a pre-raphaelite"
Hitchcock II.	1991	Društvo za teoretsko psihoanalizo, Ljubljana		slovene text titled Dans ses yeux insolents je vois ma perte écrite
Beseda, dejanje svoboda: Filozofija skoz psihoanalizo V.	1990	Društvo za teoretsko psihoanalizo, Ljubljana		"Roberto Rosellini: death, freedom, suicide"
Druga smrt Josipa Broza Tita	1989	Državna založba Slovenije, Ljubljana		
Pogled s strani	1988	Ekran, Ljubljana		
Jezik, ideologija, Slovenci	1987	Delavska enotnost, Ljubljana		
Hegel in objekt	1985	Društvo za teoretsko psihoanalizo, Ljubljana		authored with Mladen Dolar
Problemi teorije fetišizma: Filozofija skoz psihoanalizo II.	1985	Društvo za teoretsko psihoanalizo, Ljubljana		authored with Rado Riha
Filozofija skozi psihoanalizo	1984	Univerzum, Ljubljana		editor
Birokratija i uživanje	1984	Radionica SIC, Beograd		
Gospostvo, Vzgoja, Analiza: Zbornik tekstov Lacanove šole psihoanalize	1983	DDU Univerzum, Ljubljana		
Zgodovina in nezavedno	1982	Cankarjeva založba, Ljubljana		editor, translator
Hegel in označevalec	1980	Univerzum, Ljubljana		
Znak, označitelj, pismo	1976	Mladost, Beograd		
Bolečina razlike	1972	Obzorja, Maribor		

=== Spanish ===
- 2021 Chocolate sin grasa, Godot.
- 2007 En defensa de la intolerancia, Madrid: Sequitur.

=== Croatian ===
- 2008 Pervertitov vodič kroz film, Zagreb: Hrvatsko društvo pisaca & Izdanja Antibarbarus (Biblioteka Tvrđa), edited by Srećko Horvat. ("The Pervert's Guide to Cinema", collected essays on cinema)
- 2015 Islam, Ateizam i Modernost: Neka Bogohulna Razmisljanja, Academic Book ("Islam, Atheism and Modernity: Some Blasphemous Thinking")

== Articles ==
=== English ===
Title	Date	Publisher	Archived
Looking Awry - Pornography	1989	October	
The Detective And The Analyst - The Shift From Detective-Story To Detective-Novel In The 1920s	1990	Literature and Psychology	
The Logic Of The Detective-Novel	1990	Pamietnik Literacki	
Death And Sublimation: The Final Scene Of City Lights	1990	American Journal of Semiotics	
Rossellini: Woman As Symptom Of Man	1990	October	
Grimaces of the Real, or When the Phallus Appears	1991	October	
Formal Democracy And Its Discontents	1991	American Imago	
Why Does A Letter Always Arrive At Its Destination?	1991	Lacanian Ink, 2	
Why Should a Dialectician Learn to Count to Four?	1991	Radical Philosophy, 58, pp. 3–9	
Ethnic Dance Macabre	28 Aug 1992	The Guardian Manchester	2004-10-15
Kant - The Subject Out Of Joint	1992	Filozofski Vestnik-Acta Philosophica	
In His Bold Gaze My Ruin Is Writ Large	1992	Lacanian Ink, 6	
Cogito And The Sexual Difference	1992	American Journal of Semiotics	
Eastern European Liberalism And Its Borderlines	1992	Oxford Literary Review	
The Ideological-Practical Core Of The Fundamental Operation In Hegel's Logic Of Reflection	1992	Filosofski Vestnik-Acta Philosophica	
Why are Laibach and NSK not Fascists?	1993	M'ARS, Vol. 3/4	2019-09-14
From Courtly Love to The Crying Game	Nov 1993	NLR, No. 202	
Hegels Logic As A Theory Of Ideology	1993	Lacanian Ink, 7	
The Inner Civilization Of Human Rights (Slovenia) And The Other Barbarism (The Rest Of The Balkans)	1993	Du-Die Zeitschrift der Kultur, pp. 26-28.	
Kant As A Theoretician Of Vampirism	1994	Lacanian Ink, 8	
Woman is One of the Names-of-the-Father, or How Not to Misread Lacan's Formulas of Sexuation	1995	Lacanian Ink, 10	2019-03-08
The Audiovisual Contract - Noise Surrounding Reality	1995	Deutsche Zeitschrift fur Philosophie, pp. 521-533.	
Underground, or Ethnic Cleansing as a Continuation of Poetry by Other Means	1996	InterCommunication, No. 18, Autumn	1997-06-12
Desire: Drive = Truth: Knowledge	1997	UMBR(a)	2004-10-15
The Big Other doesn't exist	1997	JEP, Nr. 5, Spring-Fall	2000-12-12
From Joyce-the-Symptom to the Symptom of Power	1997	Lacanian Ink, 11, pp. 12–25	2018-03-21
Psychoanalysis and Post-Marxism: The Case of Alain Badiou	1998	The South Atlantic Quarterly, Spring	2004-10-15
For a Leftist Appropriation of the European Legacy	Feb 1998	Journal of Political Ideologies	2004-10-15
When the Party Commits Suicide	1999	The Human Rights Project	2004-10-15
Against The Double Blackmail	1999	Lacan dot com	2000-08-17
The Thing from Inner Space	1 Apr 1999	ARTMargins: Mainview	2001-01-24
"You May!": the post-modern superego	18 Mar 1999	LRB	2022-10-07
NATO, the Left Hand of God	29 June 1999	Nettime	2004-10-15
The Superego and the Act	1 Aug 1999	EGS	2019-03-27
Attempts to Escape the Logic of Capitalism: On the Political Tragedy of Vaclav Havel	28 Oct 1999	LRB	2023-01-25
The Matrix, or, the Two Sides of Perversion	28 Oct 1999	Lacan dot com	2004-06-04
Human Rights and Its Discontents	15 Nov 1999	Lacan dot com	2004-12-17
Laugh Yourself to Death: the new wave of Holocaust comedies!	15 Dec 1999	Lacan dot com	2005-12-14
No Sex Please! We Are Post-Humans	2000	Lacan dot com	2001-01-25
Why We All Love to Hate Haider	Mar 2000	NLR, No. 2, pp. 37–45	2012-11-20
Have Michael Hardt and Antonio Negri Rewritten the Communist manifesto for the Twenty-First Century?	2001	Rethinking Marxism, No. 3/4	2004-10-14
From Western Marxism to Western Buddhism	2001	Cabinet Magazine, Spring 2001	2003-05-07
On Peter Singer	2001	Cabinet Magazine, Fall 2001	
Can Lenin Tell Us about Freedom Today?	2001	The Symptom, Issue 1, Autumn	2019-06-02
Repeating Lenin	2001	@®kz!n	2001-04-13
Is There a Proper Way to Remake a Hitchcock Film?	2001	Lacan dot com	2001-02-22
Self-Deceptions: On Being Tolerant and Smug	27 Aug 2001	Die Gazette	2004-10-15
Welcome to the Desert of the Real (1st version)	17 Sep 2001	Lacan dot com	2004-06-18
The Desert of the Real	29 Oct 2001	In These Times	2018-04-17
Welcome to the Desert of the Real – Reflections on WTC (3rd version)	2002	The Symptom, Issue 2, Spring	2002-04-26
The Interpassive Subject	2002	The Symptom, Issue 3, Autumn	2002-12-26
A Plea for Leninist Intolerance	2002	Critical Inquiry, Winter	2004-10-15
A cyberspace Lenin: why not?	2002	ISJ, Winter	2003-10-25
To know, or not to know	20 April 2002	New Scientist	
Are We in a War? Do We Have an Enemy?	10 May 2002	LRB	2004-10-15
Seize the day: Lenin's legacy	23 July 2002	The Guardian	2014-09-09
Seize the Day: Lenin's Legacy	25 July 2002	LRB	2004-10-15
Catastrophes Real and Imagined	28 Feb 2003	In These Times	2010-12-16
In His Bold Gaze My Ruin Is Writ Large	2003	The Symptom, Issue 4, Spring	2003-07-03
Human Rights in a Chocolate Egg	2003	Cabinet Magazine, Summer 2003	
The Iraq War: Where is the True Danger?	13 Mar 2003	Lacan dot com	2003-10-04
Today, Iraq. Tomorrow … Democracy?	18 Mar 2003	In These Times	2016-08-18
East of Art: Transformations in Eastern Europe: “On (Un-) Changing Canons and Extreme Avantgardes”	23 Mar 2003	ARTMargins	2019-08-04
Paranoid Reflections: What’s going on?	3 Apr 2003	LRB	2021-01-16
Too Much Democracy?	14 Apr 2003	Lacan dot com	2019-03-08
How Much Democracy Is Too Much?	19 May 2003	In These Times	2008-12-03
Bring me my Philips Mental Jacket: Improve Your Performance!	22 May 2003	LRB	2004-12-17
Ideology Reloaded	6 June 2003	In These Times	2005-04-03
Will You Laugh for Me, Please?	18 July 2003	In These Times	2018-04-08
Not a desire to have him, but to be like him: Highsmith is the One	21 Aug 2003	LRB	2023-03-06
Learning To Love Leni Riefenstahl	10 Sep 2003	In These Times	2007-11-02
Heiner Mueller out of Joint	25 Sep 2003	Lacan dot com	2019-03-08
Homo Sacer as the Object of the Discourse of the University	25 Sep 2003	Lacan dot com	2003-12-19
The Iraqi MacGuffin	4 Nov 2003	Lacan dot com	2004-06-14
Parallax: Henning Mankell	20 Nov 2003	LRB	2023-06-20
Passion In The Era of Decaffeinated Belief	2004	The Symptom, Issue 5, Winter	2004-10-15
Christians, Jews and Other Criminals: A Critique of Jean-Claude Milner	2004	Lacan dot com	2019-02-17
A Cup of Decaf Reality	2004	Lacan dot com	2019-04-18
Death's Merciless Love	2004	Lacan dot com	2004-06-04
Ethical Socialism? No, Thanks!	2004	TELOS, No. 129, pp. 173–189	2019-03-04
Henning Mankell, the Artist of the Parallax View	2004	Lacan dot com	2004-12-29
On Opera: Walhalla's Frigid Joys	2004	Lacan dot com	2004-08-25
On Opera: La Clemenza di Tito, or the Ridiculously-Obscene Excess of Mercy	2004	Lacan dot com	2018-05-06
On Opera: The Sex of Orpheus	2004	Lacan dot com	2004-08-25
Will You Laugh for Me, Please	2004	Lacan dot com	2004-12-13
Iraq's False Promises	10 Jan 2004	Lacan dot com	2004-08-03
What Is To Be Done (With Lenin)?	21 Jan 2004	In These Times	2008-12-02
Passion: Regular or Decaf?	27 Feb 2004	In These Times	2008-09-06
What Does Europe Want?	1 May 2004	In These Times	2010-12-16
What Rumsfeld Doesn't Know That He Knows About Abu Ghraib	21 May 2004	In These Times	2007-12-15
Between Two Deaths: The Culture of Torture	3 Jun 2004	LRB	2022-08-14
Knee-Deep: Leftist Platitudes	2 Sep 2004	LRB	2022-07-02
The Iraqi Borrowed Kettle	12 Sep 2004	Lacan dot com	2005-04-03
The Free World … of Slums	23 Sep 2004	In These Times	2014-08-06
Over the Rainbow: Populist Conservatism	4 Nov 2004	LRB	2022-10-31
The Liberal Waterloo: Or, finally some good news from Washington!	5 Nov 2004	In These Times	2008-05-11
Hooray for Bush!	2 Dec 2004	LRB	2006-06-28
The Act and its Vicissitudes	2005	The Symptom, Issue 6, Spring	2005-10-23
Over the Rainbow Coalition!	2005	Lacan dot com, Spring	2005-10-23
The Christian-Hegelian Comedy	2005	Cabinet Magazine, Spring 2005	
The Not-So-Quiet American	14 Feb 2005	In These Times	2007-08-17
The empty wheelbarrow	19 Feb 2005	The Guardian	2019-03-08
Where to Look for a Revolutionary Potential?	2005	Adbusters: The Magazine, March–April	2005-12-10
The Two Totalitarianisms: Stalin applauded too	17 Mar 2005	LRB	2022-07-06
The Popes Failures	8 Apr 2005	In These Times	2007-08-18
Revenge of Global Finance	21 May 2005	In These Times	2008-12-02
The Constitution is Dead. Long Live Proper Politics	4 June 2005	The Guardian	2019-03-27
Thanks, But Well Do It Ourselves: Against enlightened administration	19 June 2005	In These Times	2008-07-06
Give Iranian Nukes a Chance: In a mad world, the logic of MAD still works	11 Aug 2005	In These Times	2007-02-23
Lenin Shot at Finland Station	18 Aug 2005	LRB, Vol. 27, No. 16, p. 23	2009-11-11
The Obscenity of Human Rights: Violence as Symptom	2005	Lacan dot com, Fall	2005-11-09
With or Without Passion - What's Wrong with Fundamentalism? I	2005	Lacan dot com, Fall	2005-10-13
Move the Underground! - What's Wrong with Fundamentalism? II	2005	Lacan dot com, Fall	2005-10-13
Some Politically Incorrect Reflections on Violence in France & Related Matters	2005	Lacan dot com, Fall	2005-11-25
Objet a as Inherent Limit to Capitalism: on Michael Hardt and Antonio Negri	2005	Lacan dot com, Fall	2005-10-13
The Subject Supposed to Loot and Rape: Reality and fantasy in New Orleans	20 Oct 2005	In These Times	2007-02-23
A Glance into the Archives of Islam	2006	Lacan dot com	2019-04-26
The Antinomies of Tolerant Reason: A Blood-Dimmed Tide is Loosed	2006	Lacan dot com	2006-03-28
Jacques Lacan's Four Discourses	2006	Lacan dot com	2006-10-16
The Parallax View	2006	Lacan dot com	2006-06-03
Jack Bauer and the Ethics of Urgency	27 Jan 2006	In These Times	2007-02-23
Hegel - Chesterton: German Idealism and Christianity	2006	The Symptom, Issue 7, Spring	2006-07-09
Defenders of the Faith	12 Mar 2006	The New York Times	2017-01-14
Atheism is a legacy worth fighting for	13 Mar 2006	The New York Times	2016-11-28
Freud Lives! dreaming	25 May 2006	LRB	2023-06-18
Nobody has to be vile: The Philanthropic Enemy	6 Apr 2006	LRB	2023-06-04
The Liberal Communists of Porto Davos	11 Apr 2006	In These Times	2007-02-23
Lets be Realists, Let's Demand the Impossible!: Why pragmatic politics are doomed to fail in the Middle East	30 Aug 2006	In These Times	2007-05-29
The Family Myth in Hollywood	2007	CINEPHILE, Vol. 3, No. 1, Spring/Summer, p. 42ff.	2019-08-01
On Alain Badiou and Logiques des mondes	2007	Lacan dot com	2019-06-28
Deleuze and the Lacanian Real	2007	Lacan dot com	2007-05-17
Mel Gibson at the Serbsky Institute	2007	The Symptom, Issue 8, Winter	2007-01-04
Denying the Facts, Finding the Truth	5 Jan 2007	The New York Times	2013-03-01
In You More Than Yourself: The revolutionary potential of the Internet is far from self-evident	26 Jan 2007	In These Times	2007-04-01
Knight of the Living Dead	24 Mar 2007	The New York Times	2012-02-07
The Dreams of Others	18 May 2007	In These Times	2007-06-21
How China Got Religion	11 Oct 2007	The New York Times	2012-10-14
The Disturbing Sounds of the Turkish March	6 Nov 2007	In These Times	2007-11-09
Resistance Is Surrender: What to Do about Capitalism	15 Nov 2007	LRB	2022-12-02
China's Valley of Tears: Is authoritarian capitalism the future?	3 Dec 2007	In These Times	2008-03-03
‘Ode to Joy,’ Followed by Chaos and Despair	24 Dec 2007	The New York Times	2012-04-08
The Lacanian Real: Television	2008	The Symptom, Issue 9, Summer	2017-05-17
Tibet: dream and reality	May 2008	Le Monde diplomatique	2019-03-27
Who are the good guys?	30 May 2008	The New York Times	2019-10-25
The Ambiguous Legacy of ‘68	20 June 2008	In These Times	2008-08-28
The Military-Poetic Complex: Radovan Karadzic’s Poetry	14 Aug 2008	LRB	2022-08-15
Democracy versus the people: A new account of Haiti's recent history shows how the genuinely radical politics of Lavalas	14 Aug 2008	New Statesman	2008-09-15
The Audacity of Rhetoric	2 Sep 2008	In These Times	2009-10-23
Don’t Just Do Something, Talk: the financial crisis	9 Oct 2008	LRB	2023-03-12
Through the Glasses Darkly	29 Oct 2008	In These Times	2008-12-16
Why Cynics Are Wrong: The sublime shock of Obama's victory	13 Nov 2008	In These Times	2008-12-19
Use Your Illusions: Obama’s Victory and the Financial Meltdown	20 Nov 2008	LRB	2022-05-26
My Own Private Austria	2009	The Symptom, Issue 10, Spring	2017-08-10
How to Read Lacan	Apr 2009	Lacan dot com	2019-03-22
Two Modes of Ideological Mystification			
How to Begin from the Beginning	8 May 2009	NLR, No. 57, pp. 43–55	2012-06-04
Iran on the Brink	13 July 2009	In These Times	2009-09-18
Berlusconi in Tehran: The Rome-Tehran Axis	23 July 2009	LRB	2022-12-04
Making the Illegal Legal	14 Sep 2009	In These Times	2009-11-26
Populism, Freedom, Democracy and Iran	2009	Literal, Issue 18, Fall	2011-08-11
20 Years of Collapse	9 Nov 2009	The New York Times	2011-08-30
Post-Wall: Neo-Anti-Communism	19 Nov 2009	LRB	2023-05-27
Avatar: Return of the natives	4 Mar 2010	New Statesman	2010-03-15
Green Berets with a Human Face: "The Hurt Locker"	23 Mar 2010	LRB	2022-08-08
Soul of the party: St Paul had it right – using religion to rock the foundations of authority	1 April 2010	New Statesman	2010-04-04
A Soft Focus on War: How Hollywood hides the horrors of war	21 April 2010	In These Times	2010-06-21
Joe Public v the volcano: We are living in an age when we are both able to change nature and more at its mercy than ever	29 April 2010	New Statesman	2010-05-02
‘O Earth, Pale Mother!’	17 June 2010	In These Times	2010-07-28
A Permanent Economic Emergency	19 Aug 2010	NLR, No. 64, pp. 85–95	2012-08-28
Can you give my son a job? China’s Open Secret	21 Oct 2010	LRB	2022-08-16
Barbarism With A Human Face	23 Nov 2010	In These Times	2010-12-03
The End of Nature	2 Dec 2010	The New York Times	2012-05-11
Good Manners in the Age of WikiLeaks: Gentlemen of the Left	20 Jan 2011	LRB	2023-04-13
Europe must move beyond mere tolerance	25 Jan 2011	The Guardian	2013-09-20
The Double Life of Véronique – The Forced Choice of Freedom	1 Feb 2011	The Criterion Collection	2019-01-28
For Egypt, this is the miracle of Tahrir Square	10 Feb 2011	The Guardian	2013-09-21
Corporate Rule of Cyberspace	2 May 2011	Inside Higher Ed	2016-04-10
Israel's best hope lies in a single state	4 Mar 2011	New Statesman	2011-03-07
The Jacobin Spirit – On violence and democracy	26 May 2011	Jacobin, Issue 3, Summer	2011-05-04
A vile logic to Anders Breivik's choice of target	8 Aug 2011	The Guardian	2013-11-20
Shoplifters of the World Unite	25 Aug 2011	LRB	2023-07-09
Welcome to interesting times!	11 Sep 2011	Powision, Issue 10: Krise	2012-04-30
The Violent Silence of a New Beginning	26 Oct 2011	In These Times	2012-01-23
Occupy first. Demands come later	26 Oct 2011	The Guardian	2013-12-03
Democracy is the enemy	28 Oct 2011	LRB	2022-05-24
Beyond the occupations	31 Oct 2011	ABC News (Australia)	2016-10-30
Welcome to Interesting Times	11 Dec 2011	Powision, p. 31ff.	2016-03-05
Sing of the new invasion: Ralph Fiennes's upcoming film adaptation of Shakespeare's Coriolanus shows its versatility	12 Dec 2011	New Statesman	2012-02-15
The Revolt of the Salaried Bourgeoisie: The New Proletariat	26 Jan 2012	LRB	2023-03-26
Slavoj Žižek Responds to His Critics	7 Mar 2012	Jacobin	2012-10-16
If there is a God, then anything is permitted	17 Apr 2012	ABC News (Australia)	2018-10-02
Occupy Wall Street: what is to be done next?	24 April 2012	The Guardian	2013-11-20
The power of woman and the truth of Islam	10 May 2012	ABC News (Australia)	2019-04-19
Save us from the saviours: Europe and the Greeks	7 June 2012	LRB	2022-10-14
Smashing the Spinning Plates	29 June 2012	In These Times	2012-07-17
The politics of Batman	23 Aug 2012	New Statesman	2012-09-01
Occupy Gotham City	18 Sep 2012	In These Times	2012-11-22
Why Obama is more than Bush with a human face	13 Nov 2012	The Guardian	2014-01-08
The west's crisis is one of democracy as much as finance	16 Jan 2013	The Guardian	2013-09-09
Zero Dark Thirty: Hollywood's gift to American power	25 Jan 2013	The Guardian	2013-11-20
Why the free market fundamentalists think 2013 will be the best year ever	17 Feb 2013	The Guardian	2013-08-26
What Europe's Elites Don't Know	20 Feb 2013	In These Times	2013-03-27
The Cyprus crisis is a symptom of what is rotten in the EU	8 Apr 2013	The Guardian	2013-11-20
The simple courage of decision: a leftist tribute to Thatcher	17 Apr 2013	New Statesman	2013-09-05
The Act of Killing and the modern trend of “privatising public space”	12 July 2013	New Statesman	2013-09-21
Trouble in Paradise: The Global Protest	18 July 2013	LRB	2022-12-21
Ágota Kristóf's The Notebook awoke in me a cold and cruel passion	12 Aug 2013	The Guardian	2013-11-20
Freedom in the Cloud	13 Aug 2013	In These Times	2013-09-22
Deaths on the Nile: Is Egypt's revolution following the course of Iran's?	23 Aug 2013	In These Times	2013-08-28
Edward Snowden, Chelsea Manning and Julian Assange: our new heroes	3 Sep 2013	The Guardian	2013-09-14
Syria is a pseudo-struggle	6 Sep 2013	The Guardian	2013-10-09
Is There a Method to the Syrian Madness?	11 Sep 2013	In These Times	2013-10-06
Redefining family values on film	3 Oct 2013	The Guardian	2013-11-20
Who Is John Galt? Now We Know!	10 Oct 2013	In These Times	2013-12-15
Who is responsible for the US shutdown? The same idiots responsible for the 2008 meltdown	11 Oct 2013	The Guardian	2013-10-29
Mandela's Socialist Failure	6 Dec 2013	The New York Times	2013-12-06
If Nelson Mandela really had won, he wouldn't be seen as a universal hero	9 Dec 2013	The Guardian	2014-01-14
The 'fake' Mandela memorial interpreter said it all	16 Dec 2013	The Guardian	2014-01-14
If I ruled the world：Slavoj Žižek	23 Jan 2014	Prospect	
Anger in Bosnia, but this time the people can read their leaders' ethnic lies	10 Feb 2014	The Guardian	2014-02-11
What is an authentic political event?	12 Feb 2014	New Statesman	2014-04-11
The Poetic Torture-House of Language – How poetry relates to ethnic cleansing	3 Mar 2014	Poetry Magazine	2017-10-12
Barbarism with a Human Face: Lenin v. Stalin in Kiev	8 May 2014	LRB	2023-04-30
What Europe Can Learn from Ukraine	8 Apr 2014	In These Times	2014-05-12
Who can control the post-superpower capitalist world order?	6 May 2014	The Guardian	2014-05-13
Fat-free chocolate and absolutely no smoking: why our guilt about consumption is all-consuming	21 May 2014	The Guardian	2014-06-05
Why both the left and right have got it wrong on Ukraine	10 June 2014	The Guardian	2014-07-31
How WikiLeaks opened our eyes to the illusion of freedom	19 June 2014	The Guardian	2014-07-01
Only a radicalised left can save Europe	25 June 2014	New Statesman	2014-06-28
Broken Eggs, But No Omelet	7 July 2014	In These Times	2014-07-18
How capital captured politics: WikiLeaks has shown us that western democracies are now ruled by market forces that debase the very notion of freedom	13 July 2014	The Guardian	2014-07-24
Leaving Democracy to the Experts	12 Aug 2014	In These Times	2014-10-23
Rotherham child sex abuse: it is our duty to ask difficult questions	1 Sep 2014	The Guardian	2014-10-07
ISIS Is a Disgrace to True Fundamentalism	3 Sep 2014	The New York Times	2014-09-03
How the United States Rolls: It's lonely being the global policeman	10 Dec 2014	In These Times	2015-01-02
The Charlie Hebdo massacre: Are the worst really full of passionate intensity?	10 Jan 2015	New Statesman	2015-03-15
The Urgent Necessity of a Syriza Victory in Greece	22 Jan 2015	In These Times	2015-03-12
In the Grey Zone	5 Feb 2015	LRB	2023-04-30
A Note on Syriza: Indebted Yes, but Not Guilty!	20 Feb 2015	Potemkin Review	2015-02-22
Whither Zionism?	2 Mar 2015	In These Times	2015-05-08
Divine violence in Ferguson	9 Mar 2015	Los Angeles Review of Books	2016-07-05
Did he or did he not give Germany the finger?	18 Mar 2015	Al Jazeera English	2015-03-21
A modest rejoinder: “Although I am far from a well-meaning liberal, I simply cannot recognise myself in the lunatic-destructive figure described by Cohen.”	27 Mar 2015	New Statesman	2015-04-13
Whither Argumentation?: A Response to Louis Nayman	1 Apr 2015	In These Times	2015-05-18
On Greece: This is a chance for Europe to awaken	6 July 2015	New Statesman	2015-08-19
Sinicisation: Sinicisation	16 Jul 2015	LRB	2023-04-30
On Greece: the courage of hopelessness	20 July 2015	New Statesman	2015-08-19
How Alexis Tsipras and Syriza Outmaneuvered Angela Merkel and the Eurocrats	23 July 2015	In These Times	2015-08-14
Thanks to the EU's villainy, Greece is now under financial occupation	17 Aug 2015	New Statesman	2015-10-15
What Laibach should know when playing in Pyongyang	19 Aug 2015	Welt	2015-08-23
The Greek Apocalypse: Versailles or Brest-Litovsk?	24 Aug 2015	In These Times	2015-09-17
Ayn Rand's Tea Party lie – Now we know who John Galt is	24 Aug 2015	Salon	2015-08-25
We Can't Address the EU Refugee Crisis Without Confronting Global Capitalism	9 Sep 2015	In These Times	2015-10-16
The Non-Existence of Norway	10 Sep 2015	LRB	2023-05-03
In the Wake of Paris Attacks the Left Must Embrace Its Radical Western Roots	16 Nov 2015	In These Times	2015-12-01
We need to talk about Turkey	9 Dec 2015	New Statesman	2016-01-04
The Need to Traverse the Fantasy	28 Dec 2015	In These Times	2016-02-14
Is something rotten in the state of Turkey?	31 Dec 2015	New Statesman	2016-01-18
The Cologne attacks were an obscene version of carnival	13 Jan 2016	New Statesman	2016-02-01
The spectre of Putogan	3 Feb 2016	New Statesman	2016-03-08
What our fear of refugees says about Europe	29 Feb 2016	New Statesman	2016-03-16
Stranger Danger: To Resolve the Migrant Crisis We Must Recognize the Stranger Within Ourselves	19 Mar 2016	In These Times	2018-04-11
Democracy's Fascism Problem	29 Apr 2016	In These Times	2016-05-21
Beneath the Veil: On the Truth of Islam	6 June 2016	ABC News (Australia)	2019-04-13
The Sexual Is Political	1 Aug 2016	Los Angeles Review of Books	2016-08-03
A Reply to My Critics. Part I	5 Aug 2016	Los Angeles Review of Books	2016-08-07
A Reply to My Critics. Part II	14 Aug 2016	Los Angeles Review of Books	2016-11-03
Clinton, Trump and the Triumph of Global Capitalism	24 Aug 2016	In These Times	2016-10-24
The Lesser Evil: On Clinton, Trump and the Left's Dilemma	6 Nov 2016	In These Times	2016-11-20
The Left's Fidelity to Castro-ation	29 Nov 2016	In These Times	2017-01-13
Lessons From the “Airpocalypse”	10 Jan 2017	In These Times	2017-02-10
Donald Trump's Topsy-Turvy World	16 Jan 2017	Los Angeles Review of Books	2017-02-26
La La Land: A Leninist Reading	19 Feb 2017	Los Angeles Review of Books	2017-03-01
We Must Rise from the Ashes of Liberal Democracy	3 Mar 2017	In These Times	2017-04-26
Lenin Navigating in Unchartered Territories	1 May 2017	Los Angeles Review of Books	2018-07-08
Don't believe the liberals – there is no real choice between Le Pen and Macron	3 May 2017	The Independent	2017-06-15
On Liberal Blackmail: Refusing the False Choice between Marine Le Pen and Emmanuel Macron	5 May 2017	ABC News (Australia)	2019-01-15
Only a New Universalism Can Save Us from the New World Order	11 May 2017	ABC News (Australia)	2018-11-16
Behind the Velvet Curtain – We are experiencing a St. Vitus’ dance of global capitalism that is providing an energetic impulse to populism	25 May 2017	Die Zeit	2019-07-15
The secret to Corbyn's success was rejecting PC culture as much as he rejected rabble-rousing populism	12 June 2017	The Independent	2017-06-27
Fictitious Capital and the Return of Personal Domination	19 June 2017	Los Angeles Review of Books	2019-01-28
Recent European movements are working to get rid of the left – Corbyn should beware their underhanded tactics	26 June 2017	The Independent	2017-07-13
Christian conservatives don't support Donald Trump despite his vulgarity – they support him because of it	14 July 2017	The Independent	2017-07-19
Elections, Popular Pressure, and Inertia	17 July 2017	Los Angeles Review of Books	2019-01-27
The problem with Venezuela's revolution is that it didn't go far enough	9 Aug 2017	The Independent	2017-10-05
How did Trump really end up clashing with North Korea? By pursuing two contradictory foreign policies at the same time	14 Aug 2017	The Independent	2017-10-06
Act Globally, Think Locally!	21 Aug 2017	Los Angeles Review of Books	2018-03-21
Why Donald Trump is wrong about American history and liberals are wrong about the West	5 Sep 2017	The Independent	2017-10-12
Korean nuclear tension: Apocalypse... almost now	11 Sep 2017	RT	2018-02-08
Hurricane Irma will happen again – so we need the answers to some difficult questions about global politics	12 Sep 2017	The Independent	2017-09-12
Ordinary people left behind by God & the Free Market	16 Sep 2017	RT	2019-02-03
Like mice, humans might soon have their brains controlled externally	30 Sep 2017	RT	2019-02-02
This is why the left can't bring themselves to back Catalan independence	4 Oct 2017	The Independent	2019-01-29
Trump-Kim tensions should remind world that nuclear weapons can destroy humanity	7 Oct 2017	RT	2019-02-03
There's a dangerous and popular fashion in Europe to be antisemitic and pro-Zionist at the same time	27 Oct 2017	The Independent	2019-01-29
Blade Runner 2049: A View of Post-Human Capitalism	30 Oct 2017	Los Angeles Review of Books	2019-03-25
Lenin knew that revolution wouldn't happen overnight – we must bear this in mind as capitalism fails us today	6 Nov 2017	The Independent	2019-01-29
America's opioid crisis & modern anxieties prove the limits of capitalism	7 Nov 2017	RT	2018-09-24
Will the new rules of sexuality be like an ashtray with a no-smoking sign?	16 Nov 2017	RT	2018-07-12
A Great Awakening and its Dangers	20 Nov 2017	Los Angeles Review of Books	2018-04-06
Alt-right Trump supporters and left-wing Bernie Sanders fans should join together to defeat capitalism	26 Nov 2017	The Independent	2017-11-29
Today's anti-fascist movement will do nothing to get rid of right-wing populism – it's just panicky posturing	7 Dec 2017	The Independent	2018-01-04
Is it true that only progressive billionaires can save humanity?	8 Dec 2017	RT	2018-03-15
Political Correctness Goes to the Vatican	25 Dec 2017	Los Angeles Review of Books	2018-03-03
Sign a contract before sex? Political correctness could destroy passion	25 Dec 2017	RT	2018-04-17
The US is pursuing two contradictory strategies with North Korea and it could lead to nuclear war	28 Dec 2017	The Independent	2018-01-04
Hegel on Donald Trump's “Objective Humor”	15 Jan 2018	Los Angeles Review of Books	2019-01-28
Sex, Contracts, and Manners	22 Jan 2018	Los Angeles Review of Books	2019-04-06
As Trump, Bannon, Assange & Oprah make headlines: The Empire Strikes Back	22 Jan 2018	RT	2019-02-03
Sex and ’68: Liberal movement revolutionized ‘sexuality’ but at what cost?	8 Feb 2018	RT	2019-02-02
The Actuality of Ernst Lubitsch	12 Feb 2018	Los Angeles Review of Books	2019-02-03
Why do people find Jordan Peterson so convincing? Because the left doesn't have its own house in order	13 Feb 2018	The Independent	2019-04-15
Legacy of 1968 protests: How a leftist revolution helped capitalists win	15 Feb 2018	RT	2019-02-03
A Reply to my Critics Concerning an Engagement with Jordan Peterson	18 Feb 2018	Los Angeles Review of Books	2019-03-03
Sex in the modern world: Can even a 'yes, yes, yes' actually mean 'no?'	4 Mar 2018	RT	2019-02-05
As Putin has proven, political madness is the new status quo	5 Mar 2018	The Independent	2019-02-10
Trump wants to end the opioid crisis. But what if he is himself its prime symptom?	5 Mar 2018	The Spectator (UK)	2019-12-19
Cambridge Analytica didn't abuse the happiness industry – it was used exactly how it was intended to be	27 Mar 2018	The Independent	2019-01-28
Happiness? No, Thanks!	2 Apr 2018	Los Angeles Review of Books	2019-01-27
Assange works for the people – now we need to save him	2 Apr 2018	RT	2019-04-05
We need to examine the reasons why we equate criticism of Israel with antisemitism	8 Apr 2018	The Independent	2019-01-28
Do sexbots have rights?	20 Apr 2018	RT	2019-02-03
Marx Today: The End Is Near… Only Not the Way We Imagined It	30 Apr 2018	Los Angeles Review of Books	2019-03-30
200 years later, we can say that Marx was very often right – but in a much more literal way than he intended	4 May 2018	The Independent	2019-01-28
Should Donald Trump get the Nobel Peace Prize?	5 May 2018	RT	2019-02-03
Troubles with Identity	28 May 2018	Los Angeles Review of Books	2019-01-28
Britain's royal wedding had an emancipatory subtext	29 May 2018	RT	2019-02-03
To understand what just happened in Slovenia, you have to go back to Donald Trump and Roseanne Barr	4 June 2018	The Independent	2019-04-13
The secret of how to defeat Trump lies in Europe	5 June 2018	RT	2019-02-03
EU must create a new world order to stop Donald Trump	12 June 2018	RT	2019-02-02
I hate Donald Trump's policies but it's true – he could go down as one of history's greatest presidents	26 June 2018	The Independent	2019-01-28
Why Did I Sign the Letter in Support of Avital Ronell?	27 June 2018	Los Angeles Review of Books	2019-04-17
The Moebius Strip of Sexual Contracts	16 July 2018	Los Angeles Review of Books	2019-01-28
Democratic left, not liberal establishment, can defeat Trump	24 July 2018	RT	2019-03-29
Three Variations on Trump: Chaos, Europe, and Fake News	29 July 2018	Los Angeles Review of Books	2019-01-27
Why being a philosopher in the heatwave is so particularly unbearable	3 Aug 2018	The Independent	2019-01-28
The US establishment thinks Alexandria Ocasio-Cortez is too radical – with an impending climate disaster, the worry is she isn't radical enough	10 Aug 2018	The Independent	2019-01-28
Saudi-Canada spat reveals the real new world order	12 Aug 2018	RT	2019-02-03
A Brief Post-Script on the Case of Avital Ronell	19 Aug 2018	Los Angeles Review of Books	2019-04-17
Why Netanyahu sees Poland as Israel's most loyal EU ally despite its ongoing problems with antisemitism	23 Aug 2018	The Independent	2018-08-24
Who has the right to bring the public bad news?	23 Aug 2018	RT	2019-02-03
Yes, It's Really About Power!	30 Aug 2018	Los Angeles Review of Books	2019-01-28
Two General Concluding Remarks on the Ronell Case	6 Sep 2018	Los Angeles Review of Books	2019-01-27
Steve Bannon's Brussels plans threaten Europe's liberal legacy	26 Sep 2018	RT	2019-04-06
Acheronta Movebo	30 Sep 2018	Los Angeles Review of Books	2019-01-28
Tragic deaths inspire a Bosnian miracle	11 Oct 2018	RT	2019-02-03
Should the Left's Answer to Rightist Populism Really Be a “Me Too”? Part I	15 Oct 2018	Los Angeles Review of Books	2019-01-27
Will our future be Chinese 'capitalist socialism'?	21 Oct 2018	RT	2019-02-13
Should the Left's Answer to Rightist Populism Really Be a “Me Too”? Part II	22 Oct 2018	Los Angeles Review of Books	2019-01-28
Until the rich world thinks 'one world,' migration will intensify	28 Oct 2018	RT	2019-03-19
To end our global political crisis, the left needs to learn from Donald Trump	29 Oct 2018	The Independent	2019-04-06
The mysterious case of disappearing Chinese Marxists shows what happens when state ideology goes badly wrong	29 Nov 2018	The Independent	2019-04-04
Racism is alive and well in both Europe and Israel – with different victims	2 Dec 2018	RT	2019-02-03
If we want to survive on this planet, we need to abandon the cause of the nation state	3 Dec 2018	New Statesman	2019-03-26
Evald Ilyenkov's Cosmology: The Point of Madness of Dialectical Materialism	10 Dec 2018	Los Angeles Review of Books	2019-01-28
The yellow vest protesters revolting against centrism mean well – but their left wing populism won't change French politics	17 Dec 2018	The Independent	2019-04-11
How Mao would have evaluated the Yellow Vests	21 Dec 2018	RT	2019-02-12
Apparently, clubs now need to hire consent guardians – clearly we've misunderstood human sexuality	31 Dec 2018	The Independent	2019-01-28
Why Secondary Contradictions Matter: A Maoist View	7 Jan 2019	Los Angeles Review of Books	2019-01-07
Current trends in self-reproach & guilt serve interests of elites	11 Jan 2019	RT	2019-02-02
‘Traditional masculinity toxic?’ New universe of subtle corruption emerges	12 Jan 2019	RT	2019-03-01
Roma is being celebrated for all the wrong reasons	15 Jan 2019	The Spectator (USA)	2019-08-19
No, ‘toxic masculinity’ is not an illness	18 Jan 2019	The Spectator (UK)	2019-12-19
The battle for Europe's soul may be lost – the fight against the populists will be about starting afresh	29 Jan 2019	The Independent	2019-02-22
Nomadic // Proletarians	3 Feb 2019	Los Angeles Review of Books	2019-02-07
Toxic masculinity can be heroic, and here are the women that prove it	11 Feb 2019	The Independent	2019-02-15
Let's not demystify the vagina, please	15 Feb 2019	The Spectator (USA)	2019-04-01
Trump or Clinton, Brexit or Remain, Maduro or Guaido? They are both worse!	22 Feb 2019	RT	2019-03-06
They Are Both Worse!	25 Feb 2019	Los Angeles Review of Books	2019-03-07
Fearing establishment, Sanders’ leftist critics offer socialism, without socialism	2 Mar 2019	RT	2019-03-30
From China to the APA, ‘medicalisation’ is used to dismiss political opponents	4 Mar 2019	The Spectator (UK)	2019-07-05
The ‘planetary health diet’ – or communism through the backdoor?	12 Mar 2019	The Spectator (UK)	2019-07-02
Assange helped teach the people about our tarnished freedom – now we are all he has left to defend him	13 Apr 2019	The Independent	2019-04-13
We are already controlled by the digital giants, but Huawei's expansion will usher in China-style surveillance	14 May 2019	The Independent	2019-05-14
Game of Thrones tapped into fears of revolution and political women – and left us no better off than before	21 May 2019	The Independent	2019-05-31
Labeling BDS ‘anti-Semitic’ desecrates the Holocaust in order to legitimize apartheid	25 May 2019	RT	2019-05-31
Transgender dogma is naive and incompatible with Freud	31 May 2019	The Spectator (USA)	2019-06-08
Only a pan-European left can defeat ‘populism’	2 Jun 2019	RT	2019-06-03
Making Use of Religion? No, Thanks!	3 Jun 2019	Los Angeles Review of Books	2019-06-03
Was I right to back Donald Trump over Hillary Clinton? Absolutely	26 Jun 2019	The Independent	2019-07-04
A Literary Fantasy: The Unnameable Subject of Singularity	8 Jul 2019	Los Angeles Review of Books	2019-07-11
The painful death of Syriza carries a bitter warning for Europe's left	8 Jul 2019	The Independent	2019-07-11
In defense of treason — If we really care for the fate of the people who compose our nations, our motto should be: America last, China last, Russia last	9 Jul 2019	The Spectator (USA)	2019-07-10
Anti-Semitism & Me Too complaints challenge freedom of debate	11 Jul 2019	RT	2019-07-11
Truth is many Democrat ‘moderates’ prefer Trump to Sanders in 2020 White House race	2 Aug 2019	RT	2019-08-03
How to boil a frog – Cyril Ramaphosa's versatile simile has much to teach us	3 Aug 2019	The Spectator (USA)	2019-08-19
The Libidinal Economy of Singularity	5 Aug 2019	Los Angeles Review of Books	2019-08-05
Make no mistake, Donald Trump's conflict with China is a genuine war – and it could become violent	8 Aug 2019	The Independent	2019-08-08
The Amazon fires should make it clear. We have got everything wrong on the ‘climate crisis’	4 Sep 2019	The Independent	2019-09-04
Trump will be re-elected because of left-liberal stupidity	5 Sep 2019	The Spectator (USA)	2019-09-08
Margaret Atwood's work illustrates our need to enjoy other people's pain	14 Sep 2019	The Independent	2019-09-14
Israel-Saudi connivance is the real Middle East game-changer	17 Sep 2019	The Independent	2019-09-17
Slavoj Žižek on what really makes him mad	17 Sep 2019	Oxford University Press Blog	2019-09-18
The Fall That Makes Us Like God. Part I	23 Sep 2019	Los Angeles Review of Books	2019-09-23
The Fall That Makes Us Like God. Part II	30 Sep 2019	Los Angeles Review of Books	2019-10-01
Impeaching Trump is not a left-wing project — progressive Democrats shouldn't be fooled	2 Oct 2019	The Independent	2019-10-02
Greta Thunberg is no genius — she's an apostle	4 Oct 2019	The Spectator (USA)	2019-10-05
The Nobel Committee honors an apologist for genocide	15 Oct 2019	The Spectator (USA)	2019-10-15
Europe's leftists are engaged in their own awful betrayal of the Kurds	23 Oct 2019	The Independent	2019-10-24
Today's protests indicate the scale of troubles in our paradise	28 Oct 2019	RT	2019-10-30
Can One Be a Hegelian Today?	28 Oct 2019	Los Angeles Review of Books	2019-10-30
Don't insult Joker by comparing him to Trump	1 Nov 2019	The Spectator (USA)	2019-11-03
For-show female empowerment & gender fluidity are simply the latest instruments of corporate capitalism	5 Nov 2019	RT	2019-11-07
More on Joker: From Apolitical Nihilism to a New Left, or Why Trump is no Joker	11 Nov 2019	Los Angeles Review of Books	2019-11-11
Morales proved in Bolivia that democratic socialism can work – but the people cannot be ignored	20 Nov 2019	The Independent	2019-11-21
Free Julian Assange — his fate is inextricably tied to our own	25 Nov 2019	The Spectator (USA)	2019-12-01
Will the global Left allow right-wing nationalists to take control of society's discontent?	27 Nov 2019	RT	2019-12-01
We must struggle against antisemitism–and also Israeli occupation	3 Dec 2019	The Independent	2019-12-04
The trouble is not with the Jews, but with my accusers	11 Dec 2019	RT	2019-12-11
Big Capital will use every tool at its disposal to crush socialists like Corbyn	17 Dec 2019	RT	2019-12-19
Human sexuality is innately perverse	18 Dec 2019	The Spectator (USA)	2019-12-19
The thin line between Zionism and anti-Semitism	20 Dec 2019	The Spectator (USA)	2019-12-22
Yes, Anti-Semitism Is Alive and Well–But Where?	26 Dec 2019	Los Angeles Review of Books	2019-12-26
Liberals’ ‘humanitarian’ open arms is not a solution to migrant crisis; radical economic changes are needed	27 Dec 2019	RT	2019-12-27
French protests show that it is Macron's vision that is the real utopia	9 Jan 2020	RT	2020-01-10
Why Europe is the biggest loser	17 Jan 2020	Welt	2020-05-26
Where is the Rift? Marx, Lacan, Capitalism, and Ecology	20 Jan 2020	Los Angeles Review of Books	2020-01-21
My Dream of Wuhan	22 Jan 2020	Welt	2020-04-24
Clear racist element to hysteria over new coronavirus	3 Feb 2020	RT	2020-02-03
We're all in the same Boat now – and it's the Diamond Princess	6 Feb 2020	Welt	2020-02-29
US enters brutal ideological civil war as four-party system begins to take form	11 Feb 2020	RT	2020-02-11
The End of the World As We Know It	12 Feb 2020	Welt	2020-03-13
Is Abstract Labor Universal?	17 Feb 2020	Los Angeles Review of Books	2020-02-18
Barbarism with a Human Face	19 Mar 2020	Welt	2020-04-12
What the coronavirus & France protests have in common (and is it time for orgies yet?)	20 Feb 2020	RT	2020-02-20
The Greening of Hegel	24 Feb 2020	Los Angeles Review of Books	2020-02-24
Coronavirus is ‘Kill Bill’-esque blow to capitalism and could lead to reinvention of communism	27 Feb 2020	RT	2020-02-28
Global communism or the jungle law, coronavirus forces us to decide	10 Mar 2020	RT	2020-03-10
Monitor and Punish? Yes, Please!	16 Mar 2020	Los Angeles Review of Books	2020-03-16
Biggest threat Covid-19 epidemic poses is not our regression to survivalist violence, but barbarism with human face	19 Mar 2020	RT	2020-03-20
Covid-19 lockdown survival guide: Guilty pleasures, Valhalla Murders & pretending it's just a game	28 Mar 2020	RT	2020-03-28
We have an appointment with death	1 Apr 2020	Welt	2020-05-27
Why Are We Tired All the Time?	2 Apr 2020	Los Angeles Review of Books	2020-04-02
The future will not follow any of the already imagined Hollywood movie scripts	15 Apr 2020	The Spectator (UK)	2020-04-19
Can Covid-19 remind us that sex is an important channel for sprituality?	20 Apr 2020	RT	2020-04-21
May 1 in the viral world is a holiday for the new working class	1 May 2020	RT	2020-05-01
Epidemics are like wars, they can drag on for years	5 May 2020	RT	2020-05-05
Mind the economy! But mind the right economy!	8 May 2020	Welt	2020-06-21
The Schmidt-Cuomo digital future is a highway to the Matrix	14 May 2020	RT	2020-05-14
The film that perfectly explains the moment we're in – and shows us a way out	16 May 2020	The Spectator (UK)	2020-05-22
The ordeal we face is not lockdown and isolation, but what happens when our societies start to move again	27 May 2020	The Independent	2020-05-27
In American protests, victims of Trump's policies help the criminal erase the crime	30 May 2020	RT	2020-05-30
The right and left are steeped in racism. Change will come elsewhere	9 Jun 2020	The Independent	2020-06-10
Greta and Bernie should be leading in these troubled times, but they are not radical enough	15 Jun 2020	RT	2020-06-15
Power, Appearance and Obscenity: Five Reflections	22 Jun 2020	Los Angeles Review of Books	2020-06-23
Politically correct white people who practise self-contempt are contributing nothing in the fight to end racism	1 Jul 2020	RT	2020-07-01
The only way out of the coronavirus crisis is a new economics that doesn't choose between health and wealth	1 Jul 2020	The Independent	2020-07-02
The Simple Things That Are Hard to Do	20 Jul 2020	Los Angeles Review of Books	2020-08-16
The Will Not to Know	24 Aug 2020	Los Angeles Review of Books	2020-08-24
Belarus's problems won't vanish when Lukashenko goes – victory for democracy also comes at a price	25 Aug 2020	The Independent	2020-08-25
Elon Musk's desire to control our minds is dehumanizing and not what is needed in a socially distanced world	1 Sep 2020	RT	2020-09-02
The treatment of Assange is an assault on everyone's personal freedoms	21 Sep 2020	RT	2020-09-22
Kurc Te Gleda — Through Lubitsch's Looking Glass	28 Sep 2020	Los Angeles Review of Books	2020-09-28
Covid crisis sparked fear of communism & China's rise as superpower. But best way to prevent communism is to follow China	7 Oct 2020	RT	2020-10-08
We should look to how Cuba coped with the fall of the Soviet Union to deal with our new Covid world	23 Oct 2020	RT	2020-10-24
The Limits of Liberal Democracy	26 Oct 2020	Los Angeles Review of Books	2020-10-26
Biden's just Trump with a human face, and the two of them share the same enemy	27 Oct 2020	RT	2020-10-27
Jeremy Corbyn wasn't suspended from the Labour Party for anti-Semitism, he was defenestrated for anti-Capitalism	2 Nov 2020	RT	2020-11-02
Biden's win changes nothing and signifies stalemate that could see Trump run again in 2024	9 Nov 2020	RT	2020-11-09
Trump's flexible relationship with the truth made him more dangerous than a fascist	26 Nov 2020	RT	2020-11-26
Trump's barber paradox – Can the President pardon himself?	8 Dec 2020	The Spectator (USA)	2020-12-08
There will be no return to normality after Covid	8 Dec 2020	RT	2020-12-08
We Need a Socialist Reset, Not a Corporate “Great Reset”	31 Dec 2020	Jacobin	2020-12-31
We're at a grim crossroads in this pandemic: one path leads to utter despair, the other to total extinction	5 Jan 2021	RT	2021-01-05
Trump's greatest treason is the betrayal of populism	11 Jan 2021	RT	2021-01-11
First as Farce, Then as Tragedy?	25 Jan 2021	Los Angeles Review of Books	2021-01-25
Corruption for everybody! – What the wallstreetbets story tells us	1 Feb 2021	The Spectator (USA)	2021-08-04
‘We have to live till we die’ is the Covid-era inspiration we all need	14 Feb 2021	RT	2021-02-14
Biden's words about Putin's (lack of) soul are a regression to vulgar racism	29 Mar 2021	RT	2021-03-31
Paris Commune at 150	12 Apr 2021	Los Angeles Review of Books	2021-04-12
Biden is wrong on Putin	12 Apr 2021	The Spectator (USA)	2021-07-31
Class Struggle Against Classism	10 May 2021	Los Angeles Review of Books	2021-05-10
Israelis’ shame over what their state is doing in West Bank would be sign of truly belonging to Israel	17 May 2021	RT	2021-05-17
The difference between ‘woke’ and a true awakening	10 Jun 2021	RT	2021-06-10
Is communism authoritarian capitalism?	29 Jun 2021	The Spectator (USA)	2021-10-11
Assange turns 50 in jail – a reminder of a Western democracy paradox he exposed, where non-freedom gives a sense of freedom	3 Jul 2021	RT	2021-07-03
How Donald Rumsfeld’s catastrophic ‘unknown unknowns’ approach on Iraq can help us deal with Covid crisis	4 Jul 2021	RT	2021-07-05
Last Exit to Socialism	21 Jul 2021	Jacobin	2021-07-21
Hollywood’s vacuous moral turn	26 Jul 2021	The Spectator (USA)	2021-08-17
The ‘remedies’ that Gates & Soros use to try to offset evils they’ve caused don't cure the disease, but prolong it	29 Jul 2021	RT	2021-07-29
Vikings, Solaris, Katla: The Big Other and Its Vicissitudes	2 Aug 2021	Los Angeles Review of Books	2021-08-02
The global capitalist order is approaching a crisis again, and the vanished radical legacy has to be resuscitated	3 Aug 2021	RT	2021-08-03
The real reason why the Taliban has retaken Afghanistan so quickly, which Western liberal media avoids mentioning	17 Aug 2021	RT	2021-08-28
The true enemy for Islamists is not the West’s neocolonialism or military aggression, but our ‘immoral’ culture	20 Aug 2021	RT	2021-08-29
Can the Taliban have anything in common with political correctness? Surprisingly, there is one thing...	29 Aug 2021	RT	2021-08-29
The Taliban is the proof that our modernity is an unfinished project	7 Sep 2021	RT	2021-09-07
Les Non-Dupes Errent	20 Sep 2021	Los Angeles Review of Books	2021-09-22
Debating whether the Holocaust or colonialism was worse is obscene… both were unspeakable monstrosities	7 Oct 2021	RT	2021-10-10
Vaccinated or not, we are ALL controlled and manipulated	2 Nov 2021	RT	2021-11-03
Beyond a Neoconservative Communism	15 Nov 2021	Los Angeles Review of Books	2021-11-16
The lessons we can learn from China’s silence on a ‘missing’ tennis player	24 Nov 2021	RT	2021-11-24
Omicron bares the world’s real pandemic	2 Dec 2021	RT	2021-12-02
In the West, people aren’t even aware they’re not free	13 Dec 2021	RT	2021-12-14
Why Julian Assange is hated	14 Dec 2021	The Spectator (USA)	2022-01-26
It’s naive to think Bitcoin & NFT give us freedom	8 Jan 2022	RT	2022-01-11
A Muddle Instead of a Movie	10 Jan 2022	Los Angeles Review of Books	2022-01-10
Boringly postmodern and an ideological fantasy	12 Jan 2022	The Spectator (UK)	2022-01-12
AOC and Her Boyfriend’s Leg	7 Feb 2022	Los Angeles Review of Books	2022-02-07
Was Russia’s ‘rape’ of Ukraine inevitable?	24 Feb 2022	The Spectator (USA)	2022-02-26
What Does Defending Europe Mean?	2 Mar 2022	Project Syndicate	2022-03-06
Putin’s Stalinist playbook – The Russian leader has eschewed Lenin in favor of a more familiar figure	3 Mar 2022	The Spectator (USA)	2022-03-12
What Will Grow Out of a Pocket Full of Sunflower Seeds?	7 Mar 2022	Los Angeles Review of Books	2022-03-07
The Stupidity of Nature	22 Mar 2022	Compact	2022-03-26
From Cold War to Hot Peace	25 Mar 2022	Project Syndicate	2022-03-25
Secret bioweapon labs are Putin’s MacGuffin	30 Mar 2022	The Spectator (USA)	2022-05-12
Five Ethico-Political Fragments	11 Apr 2022	Los Angeles Review of Books	2022-04-11
War in a World that Stands for Nothing	18 Apr 2022	Project Syndicate	2022-04-18
Heroes of the Apocalypse	11 May 2022	Project Syndicate	2022-05-13
The Political Implications of Non-Representative Art	16 May 2022	Los Angeles Review of Books	2022-05-16
We must stop letting Russia define the terms of the Ukraine crisis	23 May 2022	The Guardian (US)	2022-05-25
A Pascalean Wager Against Scientific Determinism	6 Jun 2022	Sublation Magazine	
Pacifism is the wrong response to the war in Ukraine	21 Jun 2022	The Guardian (US)	2022-06-21
The Betrayal of the Left	11 Jul 2022	Project Syndicate	2022-07-13
The Communist Desire	25 Jul 2022	Los Angeles Review of Books	2022-07-29
What the “Woke” Left and the Alt-Right Share	3 Aug 2022	Project Syndicate	2022-08-03
Degeneracy, Depravity, and the New Right	17 Aug 2022	Project Syndicate	2022-08-17
Ukraine’s Tale of Two Colonizations	30 Aug 2022	Project Syndicate	2022-09-01
Why Gorbachev Failed	31 Aug 2022	Compact	2022-08-31
Ukraine Is Palestine, Not Israel	14 Sep 2022	Project Syndicate	2022-09-15
On “Legitimate Rapes”	26 Sep 2022	Los Angeles Review of Books	2022-09-26
Women, Life, Freedom, and the Left	5 Oct 2022	Project Syndicate	2022-10-14
The Ukraine Safari	13 Oct 2022	Project Syndicate	2022-10-13
The Russian Kopi Luwak	17 Oct 2022	Sublation Magazine	
The Orgy at the End of the World	27 Oct 2022	Project Syndicate	2022-10-27
The Faces of New Barbarism	31 Oct 2022	Los Angeles Review of Books	2022-11-02
Ethics on the Rocks	22 Nov 2022	Project Syndicate	2022-11-22
Eating the Last Cannibal	30 Dec 2022	Project Syndicate	2022-12-30
Why Lacan Is Not a Buddhist: A Belated Reply to My Critics	1 Jan 2023	Los Angeles Review of Books	2023-01-02
What Lies Ahead?	17 Jan 2023	Jacobin	2023-01-17
Death or Glory in Russia	1 Feb 2023	Project Syndicate	2023-02-18
The Dark Side of Neutrality	17 Feb 2023	Project Syndicate	2023-06-09
Wokeness is Here to Stay	22 Feb 2023	Compact	2023-02-22
Why Politics Is Immanently Theological, Part I	27 Feb 2023	Los Angeles Review of Books	2023-02-27
The Slippery Slope of Occupation	1 Mar 2023	Project Syndicate	2023-03-01
Why Politics Is Immanently Theological, Part II	6 Mar 2023	Los Angeles Review of Books	2023-04-09
Artificial Idiocy	23 Mar 2023	Project Syndicate	2023-04-05
The Post-Human Desert	7 Apr 2023	Project Syndicate	2023-04-13
Suck My Tongue, Crush My Balls	20 Apr 2023	Project Syndicate	2023-04-21
Anti-Semitism and Intersectionality	29 May 2023	Project Syndicate	2023-05-29
Confessions of a Radioactive Mind	13 Jun 2023	Compact	2023-06-22
Without Whistleblowers, the West Is Lost	21 Jun 2023	Project Syndicate	2023-06-21
The Axis of Denial	29 Jun 2023	Project Syndicate	2023-07-30
The left must embrace law and order	4 Jul 2023	New Statesman	
Barbie can't handle the truth	22 Jul 2023	New Statesman	
Ukraine must go to war with itself	14 Aug 2023	New Statesman	
Manipur Is Not Only in India	14 Aug 2023	Los Angeles Review of Books	2023-08-15
Oliver Anthony does not have the answers	21 Aug 2023	New Statesman	
National Derangements	30 Aug 2023	Project Syndicate	2023-08-30
Why the West will keep losing in Africa	4 Sep 2023	New Statesman	
The Dialectic of Dark Enlightenment	12 Sep 2023	Compact	
Absolute Invariants in Physics and Society	18 Sep 2023	Los Angeles Review of Books	2023-09-20
Freedom Without Justice	2 Oct 2023	Project Syndicate	2025-08-05
The Real Dividing Line in Israel-Palestine	13 Oct 2023	Project Syndicate	2023-10-13
The Poet and the Tyrant	13 Oct 2023	Compact	
Who is to blame?	19 Oct 2023	New Statesman	
The Middle East's Deadly Taboos	15 Nov 2023	Compact	
The New Roots of Anti-Semitism	30 Nov 2023	Project Syndicate	2023-12-04
What the left gets wrong about Gaza and “decolonisation”	20 Dec 2023	New Statesman	
Elon Musk ruined my sex life	2 Feb 2024	New Statesman	
The Horror of Taylor Swift Deepfakes	6 Feb 2024	Compact	
Lenin's Lesson for Israel and Ukraine	6 Feb 2024	Project Syndicate	2024-02-06
Haiti's Proud Boys	18 Mar 2024	Project Syndicate	2024-03-18
No Barbarism Without Poetry	5 Apr 2024	Project Syndicate	2024-04-05
Happy Birthday Kant, You Lousy Sadist	22 Apr 2024	Compact	
Canceling Palestine	23 Apr 2024	Project Syndicate	2024-04-28
Protests of Despair	11 May 2024	Project Syndicate	2024-05-11
The Specter of Neo-Fascism Is Haunting Europe	18 Jun 2024	Project Syndicate	2024-06-18
Assange Is Free, But Are We?	27 Jun 2024	Project Syndicate	2024-06-27
We Are All Biomass	23 Jul 2024	Project Syndicate	2024-07-23
The Emancipatory Meaning of the Paris Olympics’ Opening Ceremony	6 Aug 2024	Project Syndicate	2024-08-06
Global Capitalism and Perpetual War	26 Sep 2024	Project Syndicate	2024-09-26
Putin's Ukraine Magic	2 Oct 2024	Project Syndicate	2024-10-04
Nothing New on the Middle Eastern Front	7 Oct 2024	Project Syndicate	2024-12-02
Saving Democracy from Itself	25 Oct 2024	Project Syndicate	2024-10-27
Vance, Dugin, Lacan	25 Oct 2024	Sublation Magazine	
The Left Must Start From Zero	8 Nov 2024	Compact	
Should Ukraine Have Nuclear Weapons?	22 Nov 2024	Project Syndicate	2024-11-22
What Did We Miss in Syria?	13 Dec 2024	Project Syndicate	2024-12-15
Fundamentalist Perverts	9 Jan 2025	Project Syndicate	2025-01-21
The New Face of Protest	13 Feb 2025	Project Syndicate	2025-02-14
Mamdani's Big Bet	10 Nov 2025	Project Syndicate	
How the left misread Gramsci	26 Nov 2025	New Statesman	
When Communissm Is the Only Option	10 Dec 2025	Project Syndicate	
Trump the Rebel King	12 Feb 2026	Project Syndicate	
Mamdani’s American Dream	8 Jul 2026	Project Syndicate	

=== French ===
Title	Date	Publisher	Archived
Une revanche de la finance mondiale	May 2005	Le Monde diplomatique	2005-10-18
La Nouvelle-Orléans, une ville fantôme au cœur du capitalisme	23 Sep 2005	Le Monde	2025-08-07
Milosevic et la jouissance nationaliste	17 Mar 2006	Le Monde	2020-12-01
Le 11-Septembre dans les têtes	12 Sep 2006	Le Monde	2025-08-07
Démocratie ou barbarie numérique	26 Jan 2007	Le Monde	2025-08-07
La subjectivation politique et ses vicissitudes	Jan 2007	Marxismes au XXIe siècle (conférence)	2018-09-03
Essai sur "l'herméneutique" stalinienne	5 July 2007	Marxismes au XXIe siècle (conférence)	2018-03-08
État d’urgence et dictature révolutionnaire	4 Nov 2007	Marxismes au XXIe siècle (conférence)	2015-05-12
La colère, le ressentiment et l'acte: À propos de Colère et temps. Essai politico-psychologique de Peter Sloterdijk	Jan 2008	La Revue internationale des livres et des idées, n° 3	2009-05-04
Le Tibet pris dans le rêve de l’autre	May 2008	Le Monde diplomatique	2008-07-31
La véritable leçon à tirer de Mai 68	2 Jun 2008	Le Monde	2019-09-07
Karadzic et le "complexe poético-militaire"	1 Aug 2008	Le Monde	2021-02-10
Lutte des classes à Wall Street	9 Oct 2008	Le Monde	2012-09-29
Téhéran en crise, ou le retour aux sources de la révolution de 1979	27 Jun 2009	Le Monde	2019-06-02
Pour (enfin) sortir de la nasse	Nov 2010	Le Monde diplomatique	2011-09-05
Mon manifeste européen	13 May 2021	Le Monde	2023-09-13

=== German ===
Title	Date	Publisher	Archived
Das Vermögen der Fetischisten	13 Nov 2000	Der Tagesspiegel	2013-11-02
Der traumatische Andere – Jenseits des Fort-Da-Prinzips	24 May 2002	Der Freitag	2020-07-16
Gefährlicher Glaube	11 Mar 2004	Die Zeit	2004-03-24
Leidenschaft in Zeiten der Political Correctness	13 Mar 2004	Der Standard	2019-02-04
David Lynch: "Lost Highway"	1 Apr 2005	Der Standard	2019-02-04
Ein Film als Behältnis von Bedeutung: „Star Wars III“ oder Die Rache des globalen Kapitals	13 May 2005	Le Monde diplomatique	2019-02-03
"Brokeback Mountain" – Trag es wie ein Mann, Cowboy: Warum "Brokeback Mountain" die Niederlage bei der Oscar-Verleihung verdient hat	8 Mar 2006	Der Standard	2019-02-04
Der Ritter der lebenden Toten: Überlegungen zu den Geständnissen von Khalid Shaikh Mohammed - und darüber, was die Legalisierung von Folter zerstört	13 Aug 2007	Der Standard	2019-02-04
Spartakus sitzt nicht im Pentagon	13 Aug 2007	Der Standard	2019-02-04
Weiße Flecken auf der inneren Landkarte: Äußere Grenzen fallen, neue Mauern entstehen – Sie zu sehen ist die Aufgabe der Zukunft	25 Jan 2008	Der Standard	2019-02-04
Klassenkampf in Washington	12 Oct 2008	Die Zeit	2008-10-15
Der entkoffeinierte Andere	8 Oct 2010	Der Freitag	2020-07-16
Zeit der Monster: Ein Aufruf zur Radikalität	12 Nov 2010	Le Monde diplomatique	2019-02-03
Der wahre Egoist – Rousseaus natürliche "Selbstliebe" ist besser als jede Moral	21 June 2012	Die Zeit	2016-11-11
Die Risse weiter aufreißen – Obama wird vorgeworfen, er spalte das amerikanische Volk, um überparteiliche Lösungen zu finden – was, wenn gerade dies das Gute an ihm ist?	19 Nov 2012	Der Freitag	2012-11-20
Eine weit verbreitete Schwindsucht – Die Finanzkrise forciert den globalen Trend, Verfassungsrechte zu beschneiden	24 Jan 2013	Der Freitag	2013-01-27
Trauriger Witz – Die Zypern-Krise ist ein Symptom für das, was in der EU grundsätzlich falsch läuft	10 Apr 2013	Der Freitag	2013-05-08
200 Jahre Richard Wagner: Was weiß Brünnhilde?	16 May 2013	Die Zeit	2017-02-09
Ärger im Paradies – Die Unruhen in Istanbul und Rio zeigen: Erst der Fortschritt ermöglicht den Aufstand. Nur diejenigen protestieren, denen es besser geht. Revolte ist Luxus	30 June 2013	Die Zeit	2014-08-22
Unsere neuen Helden – Assange, Manning und Snowden stehen für eine neue Ethik der Verantwortung	5 Sep 2013	Der Freitag	2020-07-16
US-Haushaltsstreit: Jetzt wissen wir endlich, wer John Galt ist!	17 Oct 2013	Die Zeit	2016-10-15
König muss König sein – Wie Hollywood von Absolutisten in demokratischem Gewand und der Unvereinbarkeit von Beruf und Kindern erzählt	21 Oct 2013	Der Freitag	2014-03-31
Das wahre Erbe – Wie geht man weiter als Mandela, ohne bei Mugabe zu landen?	16 Dec 2013	Der Freitag	2020-07-16
Authentische Empörung – Zum ersten Mal seit dem Auseinanderbrechen Jugoslawiens demonstrieren Menschen auf dem Balkan nicht gegen - sondern miteinander	11 Feb 2014	Der Freitag	2020-07-16
Rechtspopulismus: Barbarei mit menschlichem Antlitz	16 Apr 2014	Die Zeit	2016-06-10
WikiLeaks: Das Ende der Unschuld	23 Jun 2014	Der Freitag	2016-10-06
Grenzen des Multikulturalismus – Die Lehren von Rotherham. Ein Aufschrei	5 Sep 2014	Die Zeit	2016-07-19
Tisa: Die Freiheit des Geldes	23 Oct 2014	Die Zeit	2016-07-14
Globales Schlamassel	8 Jan 2015	Die Zeit	2017-02-17
Wer hat die Kraft der Leidenschaft?	28 Jan 2015	Die Zeit	2016-06-30
Was ist jetzt noch links? – In dieser Woche erleben wir einen Kampf um die demokratische Leitkultur. Es geht nicht um die Griechen. Es geht um uns alle!	5 July 2015	Die Zeit	2015-11-19
„Yes means Yes“: Was kann ich sagen, wenn ich Sex mit dir will?	29 July 2015	Welt	2015-07-30
Was Laibach in Pjöngjang wissen müssen	19 Aug 2015	Welt	2015-09-24
Syriza: Ekstatische Energien	23 Aug 2015	Die Zeit	2016-03-30
Wenn die Utopie explodiert	27 Sep 2015	Die Zeit	2015-10-01
Störung unter der Kuppel – Wir müssen den Klassenkampf wieder auf die Tagesordnung setzen – sonst bleibt unser Mitgefühl mit den Pariser Opfern eine hohle Geste	23 Nov 2015	Die Zeit	2015-11-25
"Pokémon Go" ist Ideologie! – Das Trendgame dieses Sommers imitiert Mechanismen von Vorurteilen und Missachtung	12 Sep 2016	Die Zeit	2016-11-30
Die schlimme Wohlfühlwahl – Trump ist abstoßend. Was ist noch abstoßender? Der wirtschaftshörige und aggressive Konsens, für den Hillary Clinton steht	6 Nov 2016	Die Zeit	2016-11-09
Wo aber Gefahr ist, wächst das Rettende auch – Donald Trumps Wahlsieg bringt eine große Gefahr mit sich. Aber die Linke lässt sich nur durch eine solche drohende Katastrophe mobilisieren	13 Nov 2016	Die Zeit	2019-06-07
Kubakrise 1962: Castro drängte Chruschtschow zum Atomkrieg	28 Nov 2016	Welt	2018-11-08
Der Sieg eines Mannes, der seine Haare als Perücke trägt	20 Jan 2017	profil.at	2017-03-26
Mehr Selbstkritik, bitte!	3 Feb 2017	NZZ	2019-11-21
Die Ausweitung der Kampfzonen – Der liberale Westen hat die wahre Bedeutung von Trumps Sieg noch gar nicht verstanden	16 Feb 2017	Die Zeit	2017-09-28
Hinter dem samtenen Vorhang – Wir erleben einen Veitstanz des globalen Kapitalismus. Und der bringt den Populismus so richtig in Schwung	23 May 2017	Die Zeit	2017-05-28
Das Leben ist nun einmal krass	25 Mar 2017	NZZ	2017-03-25
Ihr verteidigt auch nur eure Privilegien	31 May 2017	NZZ	2017-06-19
Peter Sloterdijk: Im Herzen ein Kommunist	21 June 2017	Die Zeit	2017-07-29
Die Revolution findet doch statt, nur anders	26 June 2017	NZZ	2017-06-26
Wer zuletzt lacht, hat's verstanden – Über Donald Trump und seine zahllosen Entgleisungen kann man sich leicht lustig machen. Den Durchblick bringt das nicht, im Gegenteil	2 Aug 2017	NZZ	2022-01-12
Das Ende der Menschlichkeit	23 Aug 2017	NZZ	2017-08-23
Willkommen in Trisolaris: Naturkatastrophen gibt es seit Jahrtausenden. Neu ist aber, dass wir in einer postreligiösen Zeit leben	13 Sep 2017	NZZ	2017-09-13
Nur ein Sokrates kann uns retten	6 Oct 2017	NZZ	2017-10-06
Flucht in den Rausch – Was hat die Drogenkrise in den Vereinigten Staaten mit unserer Wirtschaftsform zu tun? Ein Ausnüchterungsversuch	22 Nov 2017	Die Zeit	2017-11-26
Werden die Paradise Papers und die Aufdeckung der sexuellen Übergriffe wirklich unsere Gesellschaft verändern?	28 Nov 2017	NZZ	2017-11-28
Die wahren Zurückgelassenen werden aufbegehren	13 Dec 2017	NZZ	2018-01-09
Gott ist weder gerecht noch ungerecht: Er ist ohnmächtig	3 Jan 2018	NZZ	2018-02-28
Die Linke pflegt ihre Fetische statt die Mächtigen zu kritisieren	5 Feb 2018	NZZ	2019-04-13
"Black Panther": Endlich ein schwarzer Superheld	28 Feb 2018	Die Zeit	2018-03-03
Die Selbstunterwerfung der Frau	8 Mar 2018	NZZ	2018-03-10
Glück? Nein danke! – Die Grundlagen der Wahlbeeinflussung durch Cambridge Analytica lieferte die Glücksforschung. Diese gehört auf den Prüfstand gestellt	4 Apr 2018	Die Zeit	2018-04-10
Kommunismus heisst heute: Vergiss die Revolution. Denk an die Gemeingüter	17 Apr 2018	NZZ	2018-04-17
Wie ein Dieb am helllichten Tag – Die Erben von Marx sollten nicht erfolglos gegen den Kapitalismus protestieren. Denn die Zeit nach ihm beginnt gerade	8 May 2018	Die Zeit	2018-05-11
Wer für Grundrechte von Robotern plädiert, treibt ein doppeltes Spiel: Er will die Freiheit der Menschen einschränken	13 May 2018	NZZ	2018-05-14
Es wird eine Welt geben, in der jeder an Gott glauben müssen soll	25 June 2018	NZZ	2018-07-01
Die demokratische Linke kann Trump besiegen – nicht das liberale Establishment	30 July 2018	RT Deutsch	2018-07-31
Fake-News, wohin das Auge reicht, und die Wahrheit ist am Ende? Mitnichten. Wir haben es mit vielen kleinen Wahrheiten zu tun, und das ist ein Fortschritt	6 Aug 2018	NZZ	2018-08-06
Danke, Donald Trump! – Erst im Moment der Gefahr offenbart sich das Potenzial der europäischen Idee	8 Aug 2018	Die Zeit	2018-09-05
Streit zwischen Saudis und Kanada offenbart die tatsächliche neue Weltordnung	15 Aug 2018	RT Deutsch	2018-08-16
Ein Klüngel aus privaten und staatlichen Akteuren will unsere Freiheit rauben. Aber die Bürger-Wut wächst	30 Sep 2018	NZZ	2018-10-01
Migration wird so lange zunehmen, bis die reiche Welt den "eine Welt"-Gedanken annimmt	5 Nov 2018	RT Deutsch	2018-11-06
Freiheit bedeutet stets die Freiheit, anderen weh zu tun. Sie wird im Zeitalter der sozialen Netzwerke durch eine Ethik der sanften Zensur ersetzt	18 Jan 2019	NZZ	2019-01-18
"Traditionelle Männlichkeit toxisch?" – Wie ein neues Universum subtiler Korruption entsteht	20 Jan 2019	RT Deutsch	2019-02-03
Soll denn nun auch alles Erotische entzaubert werden? In was für langweiligen Zeiten leben wir eigentlich?	14 Mar 2019	NZZ	2019-12-28
Lasst hundert Wikileaks erblühen!	13 Apr 2019	Welt	2020-05-27
Rechtspopulisten sind nicht das Problem, Linkspopulisten haben sich verrannt – und die Grünen sind die neue Partei des Status quo	14 Jun 2019	NZZ	2019-06-16
Wir brauchen mehr Leute wie Julian Assange	17 Jun 2019	Welt	2020-05-27
Wir weiden uns am Unglück der anderen: warum wir in den ideologischsten aller Zeiten leben	27 Aug 2019	NZZ	2019-11-11
Eine Amtsenthebung Trumps? Nicht so einfach, wie es aussieht	2 Oct 2019	NZZ	2019-10-04
Wer Trump mit dem Joker vergleicht, beleidigt den Joker	7 Nov 2019	Welt	2020-05-27
Das System am toten Punkt: Wie "Joker" gnadenlos die Krankheiten unserer Zeit aufzeigt	10 Nov 2019	RT Deutsch	2019-11-10
Überlässt die globale Linke die Unzufriedenen der Gesellschaft den rechten Nationalisten?	9 Dec 2019	RT Deutsch	2019-12-09
Eine neue Form von Systemkritik: Wie die rechten Populisten die linken Dissidenten von einst beerbt haben	2 Jan 2020	NZZ	2020-03-20
Falsche Freunde	9 Jan 2020	Der Freitag	2020-02-12
Liebe Linke: Vergesst die Revolution! Besinnt euch stattdessen auf das, was einmal anständige konservative Politik war	6 Feb 2020	NZZ	2020-02-06
Brutaler ideologischer Bürgerkrieg in den USA im Wandel zum Vier-Parteien-Staat	23 Feb 2020	RT Deutsch	2020-02-23
Kein Weg zurück	26 Feb 2020	Der Freitag	2020-05-16
Wir Verdrängungskünstler: wie das Coronavirus uns verändert	4 Mar 2020	NZZ	2020-06-18
Der Mensch wird nicht mehr derselbe gewesen sein: Das ist die Lektion, die das Coronavirus für uns bereithält	13 Mar 2020	NZZ	2020-04-04
Corona-Virus setzt unter Zugzwang – globaler Kommunismus oder Gesetz des Dschungels	14 Mar 2020	RT Deutsch	2020-03-14
Halte dich an Rituale, Formeln, Marotten – Tipps von Slavoj Žižek zum erfolgreichen Überleben in der Quarantäne	5 Apr 2020	NZZ	2020-04-07
Die Epidemie hat die Ökologie begraben: Aber hängen die beiden Fragen (und auch jene nach dem Rassismus) doch zusammen?	18 Jun 2020	NZZ	2020-06-18
Greta und Bernie sollten in diesen unruhigen Zeiten führen – aber sie sind nicht radikal genug	20 Jun 2020	RT Deutsch	2020-06-21
Selbstverachtung politisch korrekter Weißer nützt nichts im Kampf gegen Rassismus	4 Jul 2020	RT Deutsch	2020-07-04
Die neue Frivolität der Krawallmacher und die rassistische Seite der antirassistischen Proteste	7 Jul 2020	NZZ	2022-01-12
Das Virus befällt den Menschen, aber auch und vor allem: Der Geist des Menschen ist selbst ein Virus	27 Aug 2020	NZZ	2020-09-28
Sie töten ihn langsam	6 Oct 2020	Der Freitag	2020-10-07
Der beste Weg, den Kommunismus zu verhindern, ist, China zu folgen	11 Oct 2020	RT Deutsch	2020-10-23
Die Zeit der sommerlichen Sorglosigkeit ist vorbei: warum der Staat nun durchgreifen muss	30 Oct 2020	NZZ	2025-02-23
Bidens Sieg wird nichts ändern – und Trump könnte 2024 wieder da sein	11 Nov 2020	RT Deutsch	2020-11-11
Mit Trump sehen wir das polare Gegenteil zum Stalinismus	28 Nov 2020	RT Deutsch	2022-03-08
Es wird keine Rückkehr zur Normalität geben – Wir treten in eine posthumane Ära ein	13 Dec 2020	RT Deutsch	2022-03-08
Was meinen wir eigentlich, wenn wir sagen, Gott sei bei uns (selbst in den grössten Katastrophen)?	24 Dec 2020	NZZ	2025-02-23
Was wir in der COVID-Ära von Rammstein lernen können	1 Mar 2021	RT Deutsch	2024-12-11
Bidens Äußerungen über Putin sind ein Rückfall in vulgären Rassismus	4 Apr 2021	RT Deutsch	2025-07-26
Du verbreitest Gerüchte, an denen du selbst zu zweifeln vorgibst: So funktioniert die neue postfaktische Welt	21 Apr 2021	NZZ	2022-01-12
Israel – Scham fürs eigene Land wäre wahres Zeichen der Zugehörigkei	22 May 2021	RT Deutsch	2024-12-11
Wie wirkt sich Corona-Müdigkeit aus? Kurz gesagt: Sie führt in die planetare Katastrophe	9 Jun 2021	NZZ	2025-02-22
Der Unterschied zwischen "woke" und wahrem Erwachen	14 Jun 2021	RT Deutsch	2024-12-184
Assange 50: Das Paradoxon der Freiheit als erlebte Nicht-Freiheit	4 Jul 2021	RT Deutsch	2024-12-14
Mitleid ist der falsche Weg, die globalen Probleme aus der Welt zu schaffen	10 Aug 2021	NZZ	2022-01-12
Unsere Antwort auf die Taliban – der kollektive Kampf gegen die Klimakatastrophe	18 Aug 2021	Berliner Zeitung	2021-08-18
Die Taliban sind der Beweis, dass unsere Moderne ein unvollendetes Projekt ist	14 Sep 2021	RT Deutsch	2024-12-07
Die obszöne Debatte darüber, ob der Holocaust oder der Kolonialismus schlimmer war	10 Oct 2021	RT Deutsch	2024-12-20
Wie griechische Impfgegner zu betrügen versuchten – und dabei selbst übers Ohr gehauen wurden	22 Nov 2021	NZZ	2021-11-22
Die neue Corona-Mutation Omikron entlarvt die wahre Pandemie dieser Welt	3 Dec 2021	RT Deutsch	2024-12-07
Freiheit bedeutet für Putin, dass jeder seinen Platz kennt	27 Feb 2022	Berliner Zeitung	2022-02-27
Was bedeutet es, Europa zu verteidigen?	23 Mar 2022	Der Standard	2023-10-01
Warum Russland und USA eine „kastrierende Operation“ durchmachen sollten	28 Mar 2022	Berliner Zeitung	2022-03-28
Polen kämpft nicht gegen Russland, sondern gegen die Einheit der EU	2 Apr 2022	Berliner Zeitung	2022-04-02
Warum ich bei Russia Today veröffentlicht habe	8 May 2022	Berliner Zeitung	2022-11-25
Russland sollte nicht das Land sein, das rote Linien diktiert	19 May 2022	Berliner Zeitung	2022-05-19
Angst vor einem Krieg ohne Ende	20 May 2022	Der Standard	2024-03-15
Jordan Peterson: Für ihn ist der Westen so „entartet“ wie die Ukraine für Russland	1 Aug 2022	Berliner Zeitung	2022-08-01
Ukraine: Kolonialisierung durch den Westen in vollem Gange	29 Aug 2022	Berliner Zeitung	2022-08-31
Der Kommunismus: Eine verlorene Sache, die die Welt retten kann	5 Sep 2022	Berliner Zeitung	2022-09-06
Ukraine: Die Geschichte zweier Kolonisationen	16 Sep 2022	Der Standard	2022-10-01
Frauen geben der Neuen Rechten ein menschliches Gesicht	4 Oct 2022	Berliner Zeitung	2022-10-27
Wladimir Putin will den Heiligen Krieg, wollen ihn die Russen auch?	14 Oct 2022	Berliner Zeitung	2022-10-14
Ob Russland, China oder Europa, die Debattenkultur wird barbarischer	30 Oct 2022	Berliner Zeitung	2022-11-10
Slavoj Zizek vermisst die Liberalen, findet viele Linke extrem woke und viele Rechte extrem rechts	19 Nov 2022	Berliner Zeitung	2022-12-19
Über den Tod der Romantik, vulgäre ChatGPT-Bots und unechten Sex	25 Feb 2023	Berliner Zeitung	2023-03-08
In Israel sollte eine Koalition inklusive Palästinenser regieren	4 Mar 2023	Berliner Zeitung	2023-03-05
ChatGPT sagt das, was unser Unbewusstes radikal verdrängt	7 Apr 2023	Berliner Zeitung	2023-04-07
Ohne Whistleblower wie Julian Assange ist der Westen verloren	25 Jun 2023	Der Standard	2025-08-07
„Indiana Jones“, „Barbie“ und „Oppenheimer“: Wer verträgt die Wahrheit nicht?	20 Jul 2023	Berliner Zeitung	2023-07-21
In der Sowjetunion nahm man die Poesie ernst	18 Sep 2023	Berliner Zeitung	2025-08-07
Die wahre Trennlinie zwischen Israel und Palästina	18 Oct 2023	Der Standard	2024-10-18
Haitis Proud Boys	21 Mar 2024	Der Standard	2024-03-21
Schämt euch für das, was ihr seid	10 Aug 2024	Der Standard	2024-08-10
Putins Zaubertricks in Sachen Ukraine	11 Oct 2024	Der Standard	2024-10-11
Volle Macht für die Feudalherren der Neokonzerne	28 Jan 2025	Berliner Zeitung	2025-01-28
Warum Trumps Gaza-Vorschlag dem Westen schaden würde	5 Feb 2025	Berliner Zeitung	2025-02-06
Was die Massenproteste in Serbien so besonders und so subversiv macht	25 Feb 2025	Der Standard	2025-02-25
Trumps Oval Office hat die Pfade der Diplomatie verlassen	5 Mar 2025	Berliner Zeitung	2025-03-05
Was wir von Trump lernen können	4 Apr 2025	Berliner Zeitung	2025-04-04
Wie der Trumpismus den Weg zur Feudalherrschaft ebnet	11 Apr 2025	Berliner Zeitung	2025-04-11
Europa starb beim G7-Gipfel in Kanada – ein Nachruf	21 Jun 2025	Berliner Zeitung	2025-06-21
Das Versagen der Linken – Warum die Rechte die Arbeiterklasse gewinnt	8 Aug 2025	Berliner Zeitung	2025-08-06

=== Basque ===
Title	Date	Publisher	Archive
Poterea, apparentiaa eta obscaenitatea: bortz reflectione	6 Jul 2020	Zeropolia/Zeropolis/ゼロポリス	2020-11-12
Auto-contemptua praktikêtzen duten persona zuri politikoki-correctuak ez dira razismoa amaitzekotz borrokaari NEHOLAKO contributionerik egiten ari	9 Jul 2020	Zeropolia/Zeropolis/ゼロポリス	2020-11-12
Egitekotz zailak diren gauza simpleak	25 Jul 2020	Zeropolia/Zeropolis/ゼロポリス	2020-11-12
Ez jakitekotz nahia	12 Oct 2020	Zeropolia/Zeropolis/ゼロポリス	2020-11-12
Lukashenko joaiten denean Byelorussia.aren problêmaak ez dira desagerturen – dêmokratiaaren garhaipenak ere pretiu bat du	12 Oct 2020	Zeropolia/Zeropolis/ゼロポリス	2020-11-12
Gure gogoak controlatzekotz Elon Musk'en desideriua dehumanizantea da eta ez da mundu socialki-distantiatu batetan behar dena	12 Oct 2020	Zeropolia/Zeropolis/ゼロポリス	2020-11-12
Assange’ri eman tractamentua guztion askatasun personalen gaineko assaltu bat da	12 Oct 2020	Zeropolia/Zeropolis/ゼロポリス	2020-11-12
Kurc te gleda – Lubitsch'en speculuan zehar	12 Oct 2020	Zeropolia/Zeropolis/ゼロポリス	2020-11-12
Covid-krisiak communismoarekiko eta China.a superpotere bezala altzatzearekiko beldurra phiztu zuen. Alta, communismoa praevenitzekotz modurik hoberena China.ari JARRAITZEA da	12 Oct 2020	Zeropolia/Zeropolis/ゼロポリス	2020-11-12
Gure Covid-mundu berriari aitzin egitekotz, Cuba.ak Soviet Batasun.aren erorieraari nola aitzin egin zeraukon begiratu behar genduke	24 Oct 2020	Zeropolia/Zeropolis/ゼロポリス	2020-11-12
Dêmokratia liberalaren limiteak	26 Oct 2020	Zeropolia/Zeropolis/ゼロポリス	2020-11-12
Jeremy Corbyn ez dute Partitu Laboristêtik anti-semitismoarengatik suspendetu; anti-capitalismoarengatik defenestratu dute	03 Nov 2020	Zeropolia/Zeropolis/ゼロポリス	2020-11-12
Biden’en garhaipenak ez du deus aldatzen eta blokatze-egoeraa significatzen du: horrek +2024an [AM+12an] Trump berraurkeztea eragin lezake	09 Nov 2020	Zeropolia/Zeropolis/ゼロポリス	2020-11-12
Trump’ek egiaarekin zuen relatione flexibileak berhori fascistê bat baino arriskutsuago egiten zuen	27 Nov 2020	Zeropolia/Zeropolis/ゼロポリス	2020-11-27

=== Ukrainian ===
- "ПОЧАТИ СПОЧАТКУ Славой ЖИЖЕК". New Left Review, nr. 57, pp. 43–55. May 8, 2009.

=== Greek ===
- "ENANTION TΩN ANΘΡΩΠΙΝΩΝ ΔΙΚΑΙΩΜΑΤΩΝ". New Left Review, nr. 34, pp. 115–131. July xx, 2005.

=== Portuguese ===
- "A visāo em paralaxe". New Left Review, nr. 25, pp. 121–134. January xx, 2004.
- "Como começar do começo". New Left Review, nr. 57, pp. 43–55. May 8, 2009.

=== Catalan ===
- « Una revenja de les finances mundials... ‘La guerra de les galàxies’, episodi 3 », dans le Monde diplomatique - édition catalane, 18 mai 2005.
- "Una emergència econòmica permanent". New Left Review, nr. 64, pp. 85–95. August 19, 2010.

=== Spanish ===
Title	Date	Publisher	Archived
De Joyce-el-Síntoma al Síntoma del Poder	1997	Lacanian Ink 11, pp. 12–25	2006-05-27
Contra el Doble Chantaje	Mar 1999	NLR, nr. 234, pp. 37–45.	2008-07-24
Tu Puedes	18 Mar 1999	LRB, vol. 21, nr. 6	2000-12-04
Cuando el partido se suicida	Nov 1999	NLR, nr. I/238, pp. 26–47	2019-02-07
Bienvenido al desierto de lo Real	Jan 2000	Lacanian Ink, pp. 64-81	2009-10-27
Por qué a todos nos encanta odiar a Haider	Mar 2000	NLR, nr. 2, pp. 37–45.	2019-02-07
Corre lola corre	Dec 2000	Acheronta, nr. 12	2008-05-04
Bienvenido al desierto de lo Real	7 Oct 2001	Lacan dot com	2006-05-27
¿Estamos en guerra? ¿Tenemos un enemigo?	23 May 2002	LRB, vol. 24, nr. 10	2002-10-21
Catástrofe Real e Imaginaría	28 Feb 2003	In These Times	2009-10-27
¿Demasiada democracia?	14 Apr 2003	Lacan dot com	2009-10-27
¿Cuanta Democracia es Demasiada?	19 May 2003	In These Times	2009-10-27
Quiero mi chamarra mental Philips	Sep 2003	LRB, vol. 25, nr. 10	2003-10-06
Aprendiendo a amar a Leni Riefenstahl	10 Sep 2003	In These Times	2006-05-27
Un Lenin ciberespacial: ¿por qué no?	16 Nov 2003	International Socialism, 2002, nr. 95	2003-11-23
El Mac Guffin Iraquí	4 Dec 2003	Lacan dot com	2004-07-09
La perspectiva parallax	Jan 2004	NLR, nr. 25, pp. 121–134	2019-02-07
Cristianos, Judíos y Otros Criminales: Una Crítica de Jean-Claude Milner	Nov 2004	Lacan dot com	2006-05-27
Repensar Lenin	Feb 2005	Memoria, nr. 192	2008-02-04
Zizek.htm Capitalistas, sí..., pero zen...	May 2005	Le Monde diplomatique	2006-08-20
Gracias, pero lo haremos nosotros mismos: Contra el Gobierno Ilustrado	19 June 2005	In These Times	2009-10-27
Contra los derechos humanos	July 2005	NLR, nr. 34, pp. 115–131	2019-02-07
El orden social es siempre frágil	3 Oct 2005	Clarín	2019-04-19
Francia violenta, la sociedad en riesgo	12 Nov 2005	Clarín	2006-02-11
Nadie tiene que ser vil: o Los Buenos Hombres de Porto Davos	6 Apr 2006	LRB, vol. 28, nr. 7, p. 10	2007-11-28
Cinco años después:El fuego en la mente de los hombres	10 Sep 2006	Perfil	2009-10-27
Los sueños de los otros	18 May 2007	In These Times	2009-10-27
Populismo, libertad, democracia e Irán	2009	Literal, Issue 18, Fall, pp. 4–8	2019-09-13
Cómo empezar por el principio	8 May 2009	NLR, nr. 57, pp. 43–55	2019-02-07
Un permanente estado de excepción económica	19 Aug 2010	NLR, nr. 64, pp. 85–95	2019-02-07

- Non-exhaustive list of Žižek in castellano.

- El ambiguo legado del '68 (20 de junio de 2008)
- ¿Han reescrito Michael Hardt y Antonio Negri el Manifiesto Comunista para el Siglo XXI?
- Dije economía política, estúpido
- Contra el goce
- De Joyce-el-Síntoma al Síntoma del Poder
- El valle de lágrimas chino (diciembre de 2007)
- Los inquietantes sonidos de la Marcha Turca (noviembre de 2007)
- Más en ti que tú mismo (sociedad y ciberespacio, enero de 2007)
- ¡Seamos realistas, pidamos lo imposible! (análisis sobre Líbano e Israel, agosto de 2006)
- Los comunistas liberales de Porto Davos
- El Waterloo liberal
- Sobre los sucesos violentos en Francia
- Acerca de la libertad
- El espectro de la ideología / En Revista Observaciones Filosóficas
- De la moral victoriana al goce postmoderno; Žižek
- Lenin disparado en una estación finlandesa
- Ideology Reloaded
- Quiero mi chamarra mental
- Matrix, o las dos caras de la perversión
- Bienvenidos al desierto de lo Real (1999)
- La medida del verdadero amor es: Puedes insultar al otro
- La carretilla vacía.
- Contra el gobierno ilustrado.
- Un Buda, un hamster y los fetiches de la ideología (Sobre Budismo)
- La Venganza de las Finanzas Mundiales (sobre Budismo)
- Artículos de Slavoj Žižek en español
- Beauvois y la libertad leninista, prólogo al Tratado de la servidumbre liberal, de Jean-Léon Beauvois.

=== Italian ===
- "Capitalisti sì, ma solo zen...". Le Monde diplomatique (Italian edition). May xx, 2005. Archived from the original on 2016-03-06.
- «Il filosofo: «Sto con Kim Kardashian, incarna l’essenza della celebrità», from Corriere della Sera, October 2016.

=== Norwegian ===
Title	Date	Publisher	Archived
Parallakse	Jan 2004	NLR, nr. 25, pp. 121–134	2013-03-26
Moralkrise? Absolutt!	1 Mar 2005	Le Monde diplomatique	2016-08-18
Gi iranske atomvåpen en sjanse!	1 Apr 2005	Le Monde diplomatique	2007-12-11
Hvilket Europa vil vi ha?	1 June 2005	Le Monde diplomatique	2011-10-06
Flukten fra New Orleans	1 Oct 2005	Le Monde diplomatique	2011-10-06
Den sosialøkonomiske muren	1 Nov 2005	Le Monde diplomatique	2011-10-06
Hatet mot Annetheten	1 Dec 2005	Le Monde diplomatique	2011-10-06
Nøkkelen til Freuds drømmeteori	1 May 2006	Le Monde diplomatique	2011-10-06
Permanent unntakstilstand	1 Feb 2007	Le Monde diplomatique	2011-07-24
Levende død	1 Apr 2007	Le Monde diplomatique	2011-10-06
Hollywoods sanne venstreside	4 May 2007	Le Monde diplomatique	2011-09-19
En fri verden – av slumbyer	1 June 2007	Le Monde diplomatique	2011-10-06
Hitchcocks visuelle motiver	3 July 2007	Le Monde diplomatique	2011-07-24
Virkeligheten bak virkeligheten	3 Aug 2007	Le Monde diplomatique	2011-10-06
Det jødiske spørsmålet	Sep 2007	Le Monde diplomatique	2016-08-03
Slutt å gjør noe, snakk!	Nov 2008	Le Monde diplomatique	2013-07-20
Imperiet med menneskelig ansikt	Feb 2009	Le Monde diplomatique	2016-08-18
Hva skjer når ingenting skjer?	Sep 2009	Le Monde diplomatique	2016-08-03
Hegel på Haiti	Oct 2009	Le Monde diplomatique	2016-08-09
Tjue mirakuløse år	Dec 2009	Le Monde diplomatique	2016-08-06
Askens lærdom	5 May 2010	Le Monde diplomatique	2011-09-14
Virkelighetens fantasifulle funksjon	5 Mar 2010	Le Monde diplomatique	2011-09-19
Barbari med et menneskelig ansikt	Oct 2010	Le Monde diplomatique	2016-07-01
Permanent økonomisk unntakstilstand	28 Oct 2010	Le Monde diplomatique	2011-09-19
Med slike venner trenger ikke Europa fiender	10 Aug 2011	Le Monde diplomatique	2011-09-18
Tausheten i en ny begynnelse	Nov 2011	Le Monde diplomatique	2016-04-14
Borgerskapets lønnsrevolt	Feb 2012	Le Monde diplomatique	2016-04-15
Frels Europa fra frelserne	Jun 2012	Le Monde diplomatique	2016-08-09
Proletariatets diktatur i Gotham City	Sep 2012	Le Monde diplomatique	2016-04-15
Velkommen til det åndelige dyrerike	Nov 2012	Le Monde diplomatique	2016-04-15
Obamas små lysglimt	Dec 2012	Le Monde diplomatique	2016-04-14
De blinde leder de blinde	Feb 2013	Le Monde diplomatique	2016-04-14
Krise, hvilken krise?	Mar 2013	Le Monde diplomatique	2016-08-03
Rabinovitsj på Kypros	May 2013	Le Monde diplomatique	2016-04-14
Trøbbel i paradis	Jul 2013	Le Monde diplomatique	2016-04-14
Døden på Nilen	Sep 2013	Le Monde diplomatique	2016-04-15
Endelig vet vi hvem John Galt er!	Nov 2013	Le Monde diplomatique	2016-04-14
Sinnet i Bosnia	Mar 2014	Le Monde diplomatique	2016-04-15
Kun en radikalisert venstreside kan redde Europa	Jul 2014	Le Monde diplomatique	2016-04-14
Frihet, demokrati og TISA	Aug 2014	Le Monde diplomatique	2016-07-02
Multikulturalismens grenser	Oct 2014	Le Monde diplomatique	2016-04-14
Terrorister uten overbevisning	Jan 2015	Le Monde diplomatique	2016-04-15
Ensom politimann i en global verden	Jan 2015	Le Monde diplomatique	2016-04-13
Miljø mot Moder Jord	Jun 2015	Le Monde diplomatique	2016-06-16
Norge eksisterer ikke	Sep 2015	Le Monde diplomatique	2016-06-11
Vulgaritetens uutholdelige letthet	Mar 2016	Le Monde diplomatique	2016-06-05
Fremmede i et fremmed land	Apr 2016	Le Monde diplomatique	2016-06-21
La La Land, en leninistisk lesning	Mar 2017	Le Monde diplomatique	2019-11-11
Apokalypse, sånn cirka nå	Oct 2017	Le Monde diplomatique	2019-11-11
Beslutninger i terrorens tid	Feb 2018	Le Monde diplomatique	2019-11-11
Hva må gjøres når kuppelen vår lekker?	Nov 2018	Le Monde diplomatique	2019-11-11
Begge er verst	Mar 2019	Le Monde diplomatique	2019-11-11
La hundre WikiLeaks blomstre	Apr 2019	Le Monde diplomatique	2019-11-11
Huawei og allmenningenes skjebne	Jun 2019	Le Monde diplomatique	2019-11-11
