= The Year of Living Dangerously =

The Year of Living Dangerously may refer to:

- The Year of Living Dangerously (novel), a 1978 novel by Christopher Koch set in Indonesia in the summer and fall of 1965
  - The Year of Living Dangerously (film), a 1982 Peter Weir film adapted from the novel
- "Year of Living Dangerously", a song from the 2012 Scissor Sisters album Magic Hour

== See also ==
- The Year of Dreaming Dangerously, a work by Slavoj Zizek
- "The Year of Washing Dangerously", an episode of King of the Hill
- Years of Living Dangerously, a documentary television series
- The Year of Living Biblically, a 2007 book
- The Year of Voting Dangerously by Maureen Dowd, a collection of her New York Times columns; 2016
