= End Times: Elites, Counter-Elites, and the Path of Political Disintegration =

Social Sciences Book

End Times: Elites, Counter-Elites, and the Path of Political Disintegration is social sciences non-fiction book by Peter Turchin, published in 2023 by Allen Lane and Penguin Press.

== Reception ==
A review in The Guardian said that the book is on apocalypse. It identifies cyclical trends in history and has found a keen audience among Silicon Valley elites. A critical review in the compact magazine said that core concept of the book which are elite overproduction suffers from conceptual vagueness and methodological arbitrariness. The review was titled "Peter Turchin’s False Prophecy". Kirkus reviews mentioned the book as a "well-informed yet heavy, disturbing assessment of where we are now". The New York Times review by Francis Fukuyama said that the book frames the present and near future in similarly cyclic terms.
