= Trouble in Paradise =

Trouble in Paradise is an idiom used to describe problems in supposedly positive situations.

Trouble in Paradise may also refer to:

== Books ==
- Trouble in Paradise (novel), a 1998 crime novel by Robert B. Parker
- Trouble in Paradise, a 1985 translation of the 1979 novel Les Coulisses du ciel by Pierre Boulle
- Trouble in Paradise, a 2006 book in the Undercover Brothers series by Franklin W. Dixon
- Trouble in Paradise, a 2014 book by Slavoj Žižek

== Film and television ==
- Trouble in Paradise (1932 film), a 1932 film by Ernst Lubitsch
- Trouble in Paradise (1950 film), a West German comedy film
- Trouble in Paradise (1989 film), a 1989 television film by Di Drew
- Trouble in Paradise (1989 Dutch film), a 1989 Dutch film by Robbe De Hert
- Trouble in Paradise (Irish TV series), a 2007 drama television series featuring Angeline Ball
- Trouble in Paradise (TV series), a 2009 Australian documentary television series

== Music ==
=== Albums ===
- Trouble in Paradise (Anri album), 1986
- Trouble in Paradise (Chlöe album), 2024
- Trouble in Paradise (Deborah Allen album), 1980, or its title track
- Trouble in Paradise (La Roux album), 2014
- Trouble in Paradise (Randy Newman album), 1983
- Trouble in Paradise (Souther-Hillman-Furay Band album), 1975, or its title track
- Trouble in Paradise, a 2011 album by Andru Donalds
- Trouble in Paradise, a 2004 album by B. J. Cole
- Trouble in Paradise, a 2005 album by Elemeno P
- Trouble in Paradise, a 2019 album by Elhae
- Trouble in Paradise, a 1986 album by Romanovsky and Phillips, or its title track

=== Songs ===
- "Trouble in Paradise" (Loretta Lynn song), 1974
- "Trouble in Paradise" (Rufus Wainwright song), 2019
- "Trouble in Paradise", a 1960 song by The Crests
- "Trouble in Paradise", a 1981 song by The Greg Kihn Band
- "Trouble in Paradise", a 1983 song by Al Jarreau from his album Jarreau
- "Trouble in Paradise", a 1980 song by Huey Lewis and the News from their album Huey Lewis and the News
- "Trouble in Paradise", a 1988 song by Bruce Springsteen from his album Tracks
- "Trouble in Paradise", a 2019 song by Alice Merton from her album Mint

== Video games ==
- Dig Dug II: Trouble in Paradise, a 1985 arcade game sequel
- Lilo & Stitch: Trouble in Paradise, a 2002 video game tie-in to the Disney animated film Lilo & Stitch
- Viva Piñata: Trouble in Paradise, a 2008 video game sequel

== Other uses ==
- Trouble in Paradise, wrestler Kofi Kingston's finishing move
- "Trouble in Paradise", from the series of audiobooks Doctor Who: Destiny of the Doctor
