= Sohrab Ahmari =

Iranian-American writer and journalist (born 1985)

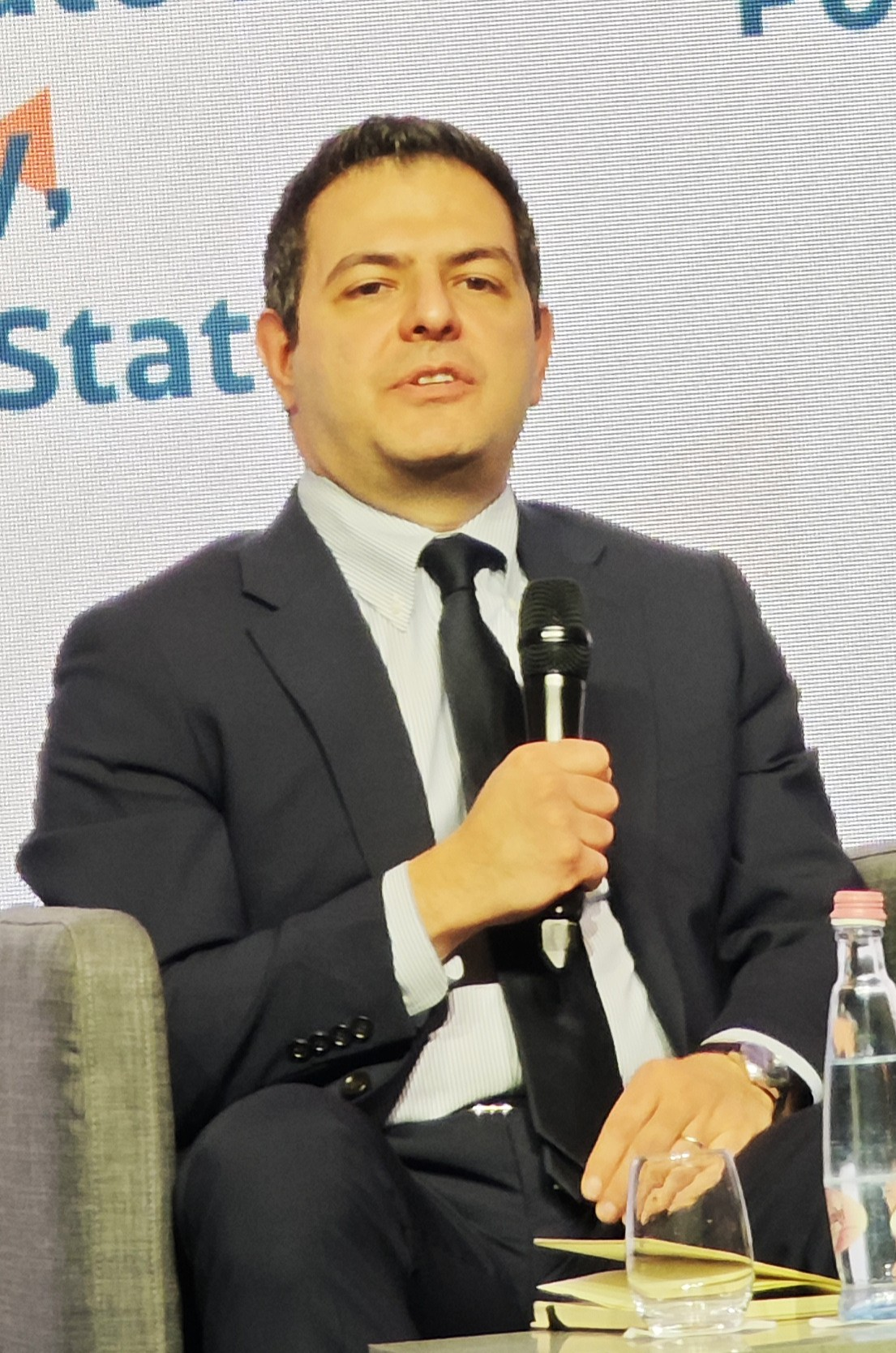
- Ahmari in 2026
- Born: February 1, 1985 (age 41); Tehran, Iran
- Education: Utah State University; University of Washington (BA); Northeastern University (JD)
- Occupations: Journalist, editor, and writer
- Employer(s): Compact (2021–present); The New York Post (2018–2021); Commentary (2017–2018); The Wall Street Journal (2012–2017)
- Spouse: Ting Li (m. 2014)
- Children: 2

Sohrab Ahmari (Persian: سهراب احمری, romanized: Sohrāb Aḥmarī; born February 1, 1985) is an Iranian-American journalist, writer, and editor. He is the U.S. editor of UnHerd and a founding editor of the online magazine Compact. He is a contributing editor of The Catholic Herald, and a columnist for First Things. Previously, he served as the op-ed editor of the New York Post, an editor with The Wall Street Journal opinion pages, and as a senior writer at Commentary.

Ahmari is the author of The New Philistines (2016), a critique of how identity politics are corrupting the arts; From Fire, by Water (2019), a spiritual memoir about his conversion to Catholicism; The Unbroken Thread: Discovering the Wisdom of Tradition in an Age of Chaos (2021) and Tyranny, Inc.: How Private Power Crushed American Liberty – and What to Do About It (2023).

Ahmari advocates an isolationist foreign policy and was an advisor to the United States Vice President JD Vance during President Trump's second term. In June 2026, Ahmari flew with JD Vance on Air Force Two to Switzerland for negotiations with Iran, despite having no security clearance.

== Early life and education ==
Ahmari was born in Tehran, Iran, on February 1, 1985, to an artist mother, Niloofar Ziae, and an architect father, Parviz Ahmari. His parents divorced in 1991 but continued living together in his maternal grandparents' home, where he grew up. He described his family as educated, affluent supporters of the Iranian Revolution who "had come to bitterly regret it". He recounted his parents' lifestyle as Westernized, secular, and "almost bohemian", which he cited as the reason for his interrogation by the religious police as a child. In late 1998, he and his mother immigrated to the United States, settling in Utah.

While in college, Ahmari joined a Trotskyist organization. In 2012, he earned a Juris Doctor (J.D.) degree from Northeastern University School of Law in Boston. Between college and law school, he completed a two-year commitment to Teach for America in the Rio Grande Valley region of South Texas.

== Career ==
While attending law school, Ahmadi began working as a freelance journalist, inspired in part by the protests following the disputed 2009 Iranian presidential election. He contributed articles to publications such as The Boston Globe, The Wall Street Journal, The New Republic, The Chronicle of Higher Education, and Commentary.

Ahmari co-edited with Nasser Weddady the 2012 book Arab Spring Dreams: The Next Generation Speaks Out for Freedom and Justice from North Africa to Iran, an anthology of the top essays submitted by young Middle Eastern dissidents to the Dream Deferred Essay Contest. The Times Literary Supplement writes that Weddady and Ahmari "perceptively edited this collection of winning entries" from the Dream Deferred contest and that "some of these young writers [featured in the anthology] possess more clarity than all the pundits combined." The book received endorsements from Polish Nobel Peace Prize winner Lech Wałęsa and feminist icon Gloria Steinem, who wrote the anthology's foreword.

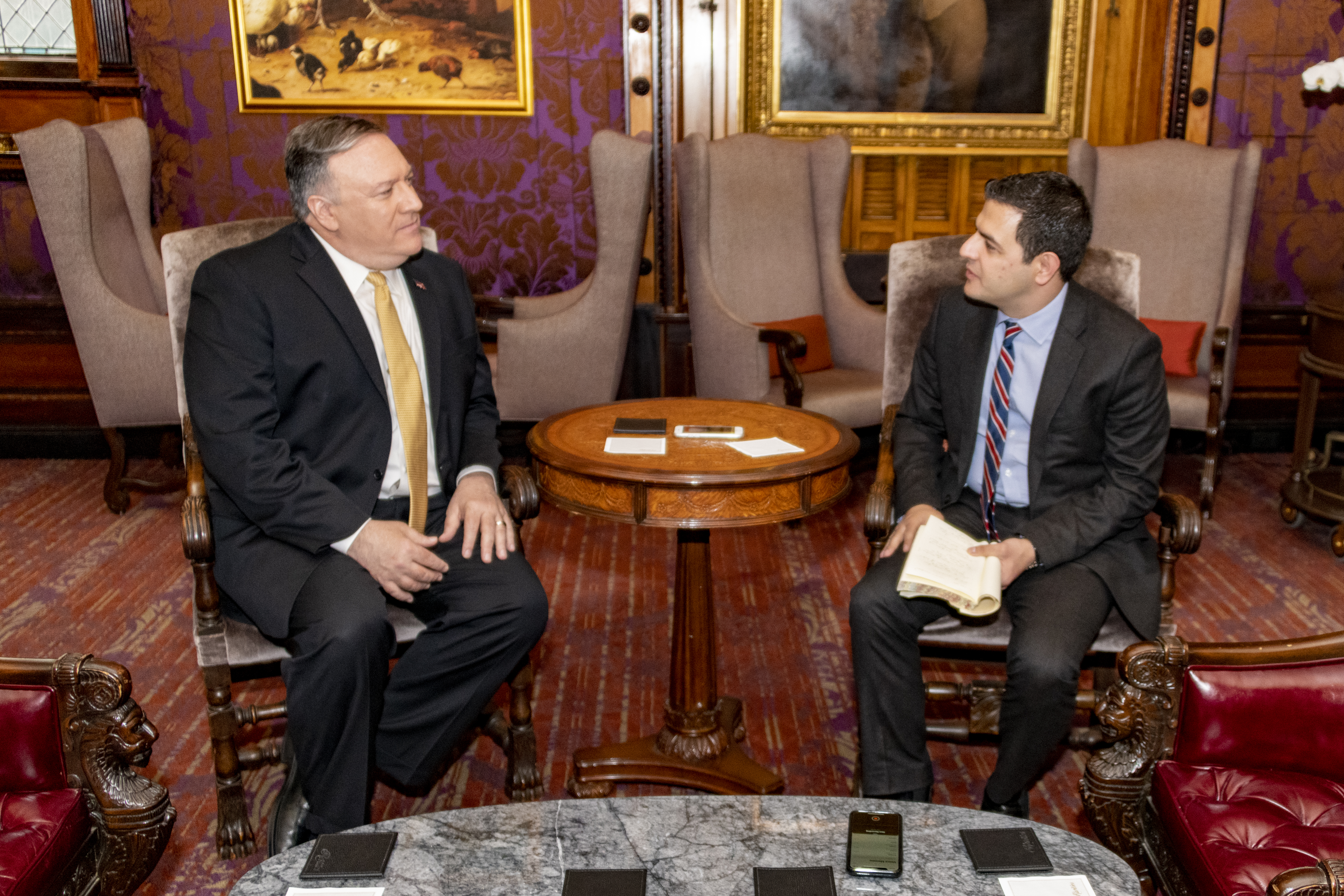
Ahmari interviewed Mike Pompeo for the New York Post

After serving as a Robert L. Bartley fellow at The Wall Street Journal in 2012, Ahmari joined the publication as assistant books editor. He then served as an editorial page writer based in London, writing editorials and commissions and editing op-eds for The Journal's European edition. In these positions, Ahmari wrote book reviews, op-eds, and conducted interviews with prominent politicians, activists, and intellectuals for The Journal's "Weekend Interview" feature.

Ahmari's book, The New Philistines, about his belief that identity politics are corrupting the arts, was released on October 20, 2016, from Biteback Publishing. In January 2019, Ignatius Press published his spiritual memoir, From Fire, by Water, about his conversion to Catholicism. The Unbroken Thread: Discovering the Wisdom of Tradition in an Age of Chaos was released in 2021. His most recent book, Tyranny, Inc.: How Private Power Crushed American Liberty – and What to Do About It, was released in 2023.

== Political views ==
Ahmari had previously identified with neoconservatism and criticized politicians such as Donald Trump, Vladimir Putin, and Marine Le Pen, whom he considered to stand for a global trend towards illiberalism and increasingly polarized populist politics. However, he became a more outspoken critic of progressivism after joining the conservative magazine Commentary and has since supported both Trump and Viktor Orbán.

Ahmari is pro-life. After the Republican Party's disappointing turnout in the 2022 midterm elections, he published an op-ed in The New York Times that blamed this on the lack of a coherent campaign message and suggested that the American right-wing should do more to address economic difficulties facing the working class.

=== Dispute with David French ===
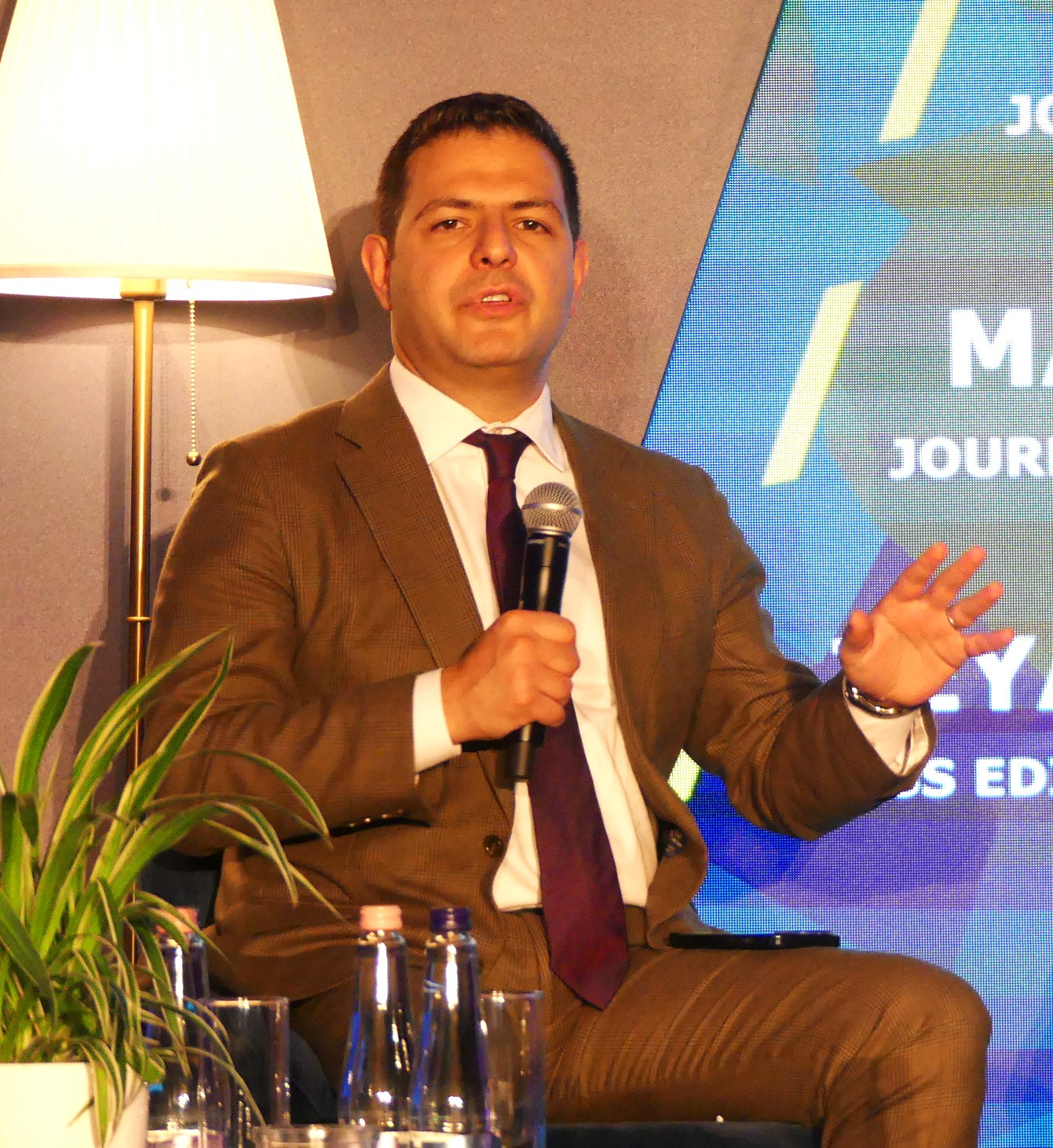
Sohrab Ahmari speaking at Mathias Corvinus Collegium in June 2023

A high-profile dispute between Ahmari and National Review writer David French broke out over the summer of 2019 as a result of the publication of Ahmari's polemic "Against David French-ism", sparking numerous essays and commentaries in politically conservative publications like National Review and The American Conservative, as well as in moderate and progressive outlets like The New York Times, The New Yorker, and The Atlantic.

The dispute began on May 26, 2019, when Ahmari expressed on Twitter his frustration with a Facebook advertisement for a children's drag queen reading hour at a library in Sacramento, California, which he described as "transvestic fetishism". In the tweet, Ahmari argued that there is no "polite, David French-ian third way around the cultural civil war". This prompted a response from French in a May 28 essay in National Review entitled "Decency Is No Barrier to Justice or the Common Good". The dispute escalated significantly after Ahmari published the essay "Against David French-ism" in the conservative religious journal First Things on May 29, 2019. In the essay, Ahmari argued that French was insufficiently socially conservative, and that his belief in individual autonomy was contributing to the overall degradation of American society. The direct targeting of French and the impromptu creation of the "David French-ism" political philosophy led the essay to gain significant notoriety, prompting a response from French and the publication of numerous commentaries. On September 5, 2019, French and Ahmari engaged in an in-person political debate moderated by New York Times columnist Ross Douthat at the Catholic University of America in Washington D.C., again prompting a flurry of commentaries.

The dispute centered on their differing opinions on how conservatives should approach cultural and political debate, with Ahmari deriding what he calls "David French-ism,” a political persuasion he defines as believing "that the institutions of a technocratic market society are neutral zones that should, in theory, accommodate both traditional Christianity and the libertine ways and paganized ideology of the other side". He argues that this belief leads to an ineffective conservative movement, and contends that the best way for culturally conservative values to prevail in society is a strategy of "discrediting ... opponents and weakening or destroying their institutions", which he maintains is a tactic already utilized by progressives, leaving conservatives who adhere to the David French-style of politics impotent in what he views as a raging culture war in the United States. He argues that the political realm should be viewed as one of "war and enmity,” and that the power of the government should be directly utilized to impose culturally conservative values on society. French, by contrast, advocates a conservative libertarian approach in which decency, civility, and respect for individual rights are emphasized, and argues that Ahmari's beliefs "forsake" the philosophy of classical liberalism that the Founding Fathers of the United States espoused. He placed particular criticism on Ahmari's desire for direct government intervention in the lives of individuals, which he argues is not only antithetical to liberty but is a politically ruinous tactic for conservatives, who would end up on the receiving end of progressive policies if the government were given greater license to interfere in the private lives of individuals.

=== Dispute with right-wing online movements ===
Ahmari has been very critical of movements that he considers to be part of the "woke right", with special attention being paid to the online persona Bronze Age Pervert, as well as right-wing historical revisionists platformed by Tucker Carlson.

== Funding controversy ==
Vanity Fair reported that Ahmari's publication, Compact Magazine, had openly attended events hosted by and received extensive funding from the Soros family's Open Society Foundations. Previously, Salon had reported that Peter Thiel was behind the publication, but this later report contradicted the claim.

== Personal life ==
Ahmari is married to architect Ting Li, with whom he has a son and a daughter.

Ahmari was an atheist from the age of 12. After attending Mass for several years, he announced his conversion to Catholicism following the 2016 Normandy church attack. In September of that year, he wrote a three-page article about his conversion for The Catholic Herald, which appeared as the cover story of its September 30, 2016, issue.

== Bibliography ==
- (2023) Tyranny, Inc.: How Private Power Crushed American Liberty--and What to Do About It. Forum Books.
- (2021) The Unbroken Thread: Discovering the Wisdom of Tradition in an Age of Chaos. Convergent Books.
- (2019) From Fire, by Water: My Journey to the Catholic Faith. Ignatius Press. ISBN 9781621642022.
- (2016) The New Philistines. Biteback Publishing. ISBN 9781785901270.
- (2012) Arab Spring Dreams: The Next Generation Speaks Out for Freedom and Justice from North Africa to Iran (co-edited with Nasser Weddady). Palgrave Macmillan. ISBN 9780230115927.
