= Josefina Ayerza =

Writer/psychoanalyst

Josefina Ayerza (born 1950) is a writer and a psychoanalyst who lives and works in New York City.

== Biography ==
Born in Buenos Aires, Argentina, in the 1970s she moved to Paris and then settled in NYC where she established a private practice. J. Ayerza is a member of the World Association of Psychoanalysis (WAP).

== Magazine ==
In 1990, she founded her own magazine, called Lacanian Ink, which gives special prominence to philosophy in dialogue with art, both marked by characteristics of the present period. J. Ayerza’s articles are published in Artforum, in Flash Art, in Lacanian Ink, L'Ane and Du on a regular basis.

== Website ==
In 1997 Josefina Ayerza created the site Lacan dot com. Its archives contain scholarly work and videos of Jacques Lacan, Slavoj Žižek, Alain Badiou, Jacques-Alain Miller as well as a vast bibliography of contemporary living artists.

== Others ==
In 1999 Josefina Ayerza started a series of cultural events in New York City featuring international philosophers in The Drawing Center, The New Museum of Contemporary Art, Deitch Projects and Tilton Gallery.
