= Nasser Weddady =

Mauritanian-American activist

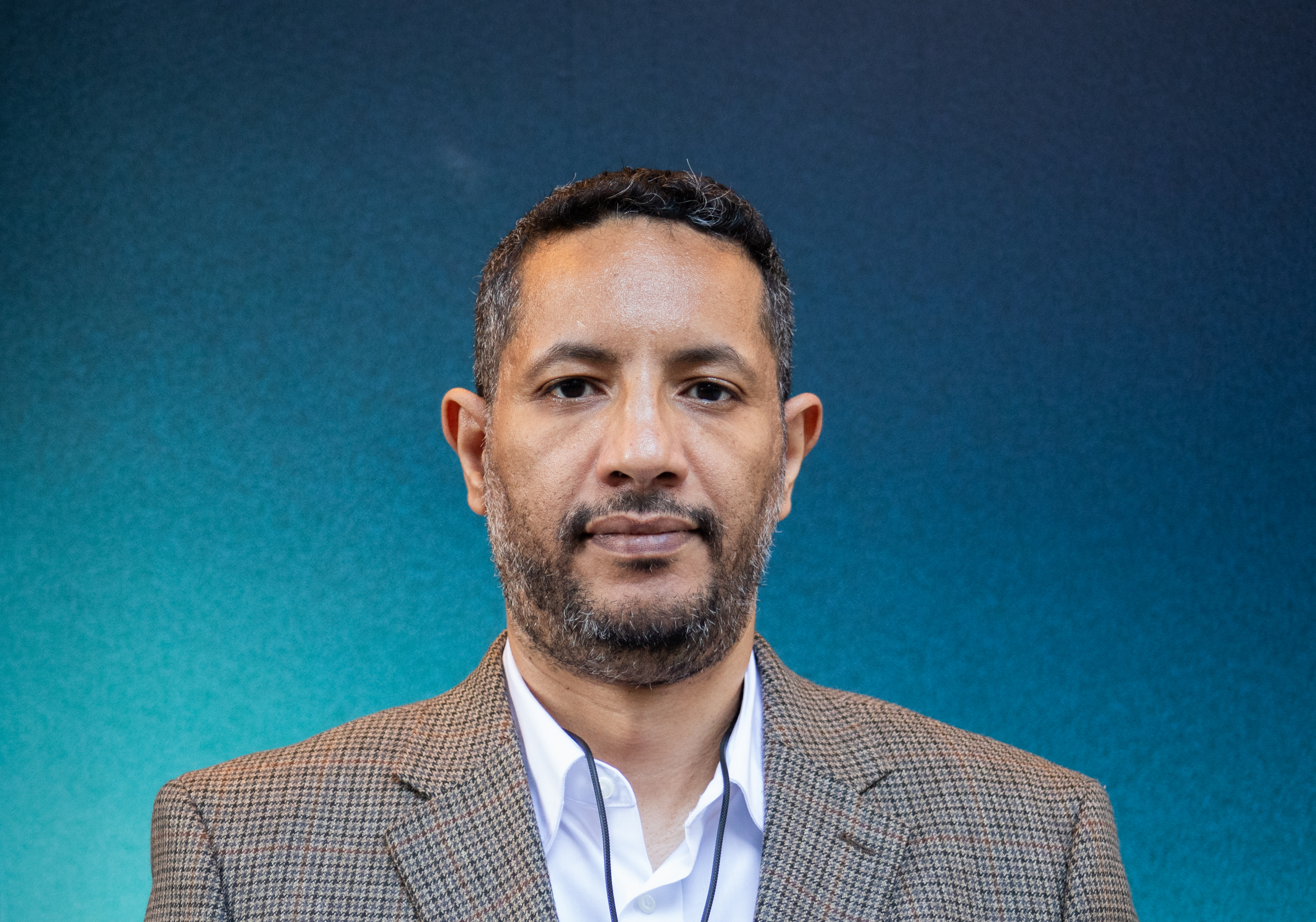
Nasser Weddady at Oslo Freedom Forum 2025

Nasser Weddady (Arabic: ناصر ودادي) is a Mauritanian-American activist known for his social media activism during the Arab Spring.

== Biography ==
Weddady is the son of a Mauritanian diplomat who served as Mauritania's ambassador to Ethiopia, Nigeria, Libya, Benin, and Syria. Consequently, Weddady grew up primarily in Syria and Libya. He speaks fluent Arabic, English, French, Spanish, and Hebrew.

When his parents returned to Mauritania in the 1990s he became involved with the country’s opposition movement. In 1999, Weddady left the country and sought asylum in the United States.

== Career ==
In 2007, Weddady joined the American Islamic Congress as Director of Civil Rights Outreach. In 2009, he aided prosecutors in the Tarek Mehanna case who were seeking to understand the sources of radicalization in the Islamic community. He left the AIC in April 2014.

In 2011, during the events of the Arab spring Weddady used Twitter, Facebook and blogs to train activists in the Middle East and draw media attention to critical issues and developments. SocialFlow, the social media tracker, ranked him among the top four most influential Twitter users during the uprisings. Weddady has also been credited with contributing to the release of numerous imprisoned activists and bloggers in the MENA region.

In 2012, Weddady co-edited with journalist Sohrab Ahmari the anthology Arab Spring Dreams, a collection of the best essays from the Dream Deferred Essay Contest. Weddady has been published in The New York Times, The International Herald Tribune, The Wall Street Journal, Boston Globe, and Baltimore Sun and has appeared on numerous media outlets.

Nasser Weddady has stated in his bio that he is involved with law enforcement agencies, such as the FBI, and advised on "radicalization" activities.
