= Project Syndicate =

Nonprofit international media organisation

- Formation: 1995; 31 years ago
- Type: Not-for-profit organization
- Purpose: Promotion of media freedom and increased accessibility to a variety of global opinions.
- Headquarters: Prague, Czech Republic, registered office at 9 Bay Colony Court, East Hampton, NY 119 37, United States, company ID: 26 – 146 99 01
- Official language: English
- Staff: 11–50
- Website: www.project-syndicate.org

Project Syndicate is an international nonprofit media organization that publishes and syndicates commentary and analysis on a variety of global topics. All opinion pieces are published on the Project Syndicate website, and also distributed to a wide network of partner publications for print. As of 2019, it has a network of 506 media outlets in 156 countries.

Project Syndicate provides commentaries on a wide range of topics, from economic policy and strategies for growth worldwide to human rights, Islam, and the environment. It also offers monthly series dedicated to Africa, Europe, Asia, and Latin America, as well as to China and Russia. RealClearWorld also named Project Syndicate one of the top five world news sites for 2012.

A not-for-profit organization, Project Syndicate relies primarily on contributions from newspapers in developed countries, which make up roughly 60% of its membership base, to enable it to offer its services at reduced rates, or for free, to newspapers in countries where journalistic resources may not be readily available. Project Syndicate has also received grants from ZEIT-Stiftung and the Bill & Melinda Gates Foundation.

Project Syndicate translates its columns from English into 18 languages: Arabic, Bengali language, Chinese, Czech, Dutch, French, German, Hindi, Indonesian, Italian, Kazakh, Norwegian, Persian, Polish, Portuguese, Russian, Spanish, and Swahili.

== Contributors ==
Project Syndicate has around 80 authors who submit opinion commentaries on a regular or monthly basis.
