= Living in the End Times =

2010 book by Slavoj Žižek

- Author: Slavoj Žižek
- Language: English
- Publisher: Verso Books
- Publication date: 2010
- Media type: Print (Hardcover and Paperback)
- Pages: 416
- ISBN: 978-1844677023

Living in the End Times is a book by Slovenian philosopher Slavoj Žižek published by Verso Books in 2010.

== Summary ==
Žižek deploys the structure of Kübler Ross's five stages of grief in order to frame what he sees as the emergent political crises of the 21st century. Thus the five chapters of the book correspond to denial (ideological obfuscation in the form of mass media, New Age obscurantism), anger (violent conflict, particularly religious fundamentalism), bargaining (political economy), depression (the “post-traumatic subject”) and acceptance (new radical political movements).

Concluding with a compelling argument for the return of a Marxian critique of political economy, Žižek also divines the wellsprings of a potentially communist culture—from literary utopias like Kafka's community of mice to the collective of freak outcasts in the television series Heroes.
