= Lacanian Ink =

Lacanian Ink is a cultural journal based in New York City and founded in 1990 by Josefina Ayerza. The purpose of the publication was to provide the American intellectual scene with the theoretical perspective of European post-structuralism. It features major analyses of psychoanalytic theory, poetry, philosophy and contemporary art. A distinctive element of its contents is the dissemination of the work of French psychoanalyst Jacques Lacan, whereby the seminars given by Jacques-Alain Miller at Paris VIII on Lacanian theory have become available in English.

Richard Kostelanetz in his book Soho: The Rise and Fall of an Artist's Colony notes that Lacanian Ink, together with a number of other journals involved in contemporary culture, have been witnesses to the century's last decade phenomena. "Today, there are but three of these magazines that continue... Bomb Magazine and Lacanian Ink are two of them."

== History ==
From its inception, Slovenian philosopher Slavoj Žižek joined the editorial board bringing out first drafts of his books in the magazine. Since then, he has been published in Lacanian Ink regularly. He aptly expressed the axiom guiding the work of Lacanian Ink: "By rejecting the assertion of identities associated with cultural studies Lacanian Ink outlines a new philosophical universalism." In 2000 French philosopher Alain Badiou joined the editorial board with specialized writing on Lacanian theory and the European Marxist tradition.

In 1997, Lacan dot com became the official site for Lacanian Ink, integrating the texts of its various theorists with an extensive special section on contemporary artists. Notably, the archives of the site include a wide variety of articles and essays by Slavoj Žižek, Jean-Luc Nancy and Alain Badiou, as well as by other modern and contemporary French theorists.

== See also ==
- Bomb (magazine)
