= Der Freitag =

German weekly newspaper

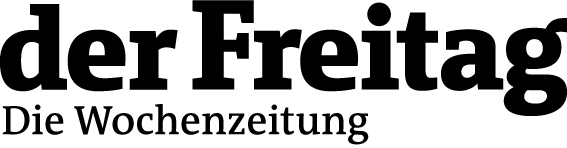

- Type: Weekly (print); Daily (online)
- Format: Rhenish
- Owner: Jakob Augstein
- Publisher: Jakob Augstein
- Founded: 9 November 1990
- Political alignment: Social liberalism
- Language: German
- Headquarters: Berlin
- Circulation: 25,466 (IVW 2/2023)
- ISSN: 0945-2095
- Website: www.freitag.de

Der Freitag (literally The Friday, stylized der Freitag) is a German weekly national newspaper, established in 1990 and published in Berlin. It focuses on politics, culture and the economy, and is published in Rhenish format. The newspaper's publisher is Jakob Augstein, who was also editor from 2013 to 2022. Augstein and other family members control 24% of German news magazine Der Spiegel. The newspaper has won several awards, such as European Newspaper of the Year and World's Best Designed Newspaper.

== History ==
The newspaper was founded on 9 November 1990 as simply Freitag. One of its predecessors, Sonntag ("Sunday"), was established in 1946. The paper originally described itself as "the East West Weekly", having been established in the year of German reunification, but underwent a substantial rebranding in 2009: the name was changed to "der Freitag" and the slogan "das Meinungsmedium" (roughly "the medium for opinions") was added. In Jakob Augstein 2008 acquired the paper. The Society for News Design judged it one of the three "World's Best Designed Newspapers" in 2010. Starting with edition 36 on September 5, 2019 der Freitag was published with the new slogan „Die Wochenzeitung" („the weekly newspaper") and a redesigned front page. The paper's logo was placed higher up and the front-page picture enlarged. According to the publishing house the new slogan aims to emphasise der Freitag's „strength as a weekly paper and as a medium for background reporting and analysis".

== Profile ==
Since its relaunch in 2009 the newspaper consists of three sections – Politics, Culture and Everyday Life, plus an additional economics section each month. It also has a monthly arts supplement called "Kultur+," which features current stage productions, exhibitions and cultural events. Several times a year, the paper includes literature supplements on new fiction and non-fiction. A "Guardian-Reportage" is included six times a year. This is a Long Read extracted from the British newspaper The Guardian and translated into German. Der Freitag has a syndication agreement with the Guardian, and prints a number of German translations of 'Guardian' content in every issue. Besides its weekly print edition, Der Freitag also publishes online daily.

== Circulation ==
Der Freitag's circulation has increased in the past few years. The current paid circulation amounts to 23.822 copies. Subscriptions account for 79% of paid circulation. Since its relaunch in the first quarter of 2009, the number of subscriptions has grown by 132%.

== Web presence ==
freitag.de is der Freitag's internet portal. The site was completely redesigned on 5 February 2014 and consists of articles from the print newspaper, online articles and contributions from the Freitag community (giving readers are the opportunity to publish their own content and opinions), as well as texts translated into German from its British syndication partner The Guardian. The editors work on both the print and online editions. Since November 2014, der Freitag digital offers the content of the current issue as a web app for mobile devices.

== Further activities ==
Since October 2009 the newspaper has been hosting a regular series of political talks called "Freitag-Salon." Since 2015, the talks have been organised with the Berlin radio station radioeins which broadcasts discussions between Freitag's Jakob Augstein and a guest. Until February 2019 the radioeins und Freitag Salon took place in Berlin's Maxim-Gorki-Theatre. Since March 2019 the talks have been moved to Volksbühne Berlin.

== Awards ==
Together with Frankfurter Allgemeine Sonntagszeitung and The New York Times der Freitag was chosen as World's Best Designed Newspaper 2009 by the Society for News Design in Orlando, Florida, in February 2010. In March of the same year its online content was chosen as web magazine of the year in the Lead Awards in Hamburg. In 2013 der Freitag received a silver medal in the category lead paper of the year. At the German Art Directors Club Awards held in Frankfurt am Main in May 2010, the online content received a bronze nail in the Online Editorial category. Ulrike Winkelmann, Head of the Political Affairs Department, was awarded the Alternative Media Prize 2011 for her satirical contribution to the Thilo Sarrazin debate entitled "Integrate yourselves!". In December 2011 Jakob Augstein was awarded the Bert-Donnepp-Preis – Deutscher Preis für Medienpublizistik in 2011, with a "special honour". In November 2018, der Freitag won the award of European Newspaper of the Year 2018 in the category Weekly Newspaper at the 20th European Newspaper Award.
