= Enjoy Your Symptom! =

1992 book by Slavoj Žižek

- Author: Slavoj Žižek
- Subject: Philosophy
- Genre: Non-fiction
- Publisher: Routledge
- Publication date: 1992

Enjoy Your Symptom! is a 1992 book by Slovenian philosopher and cultural theorist Slavoj Žižek. The book's title refers to Lacanian psychoanalysis. The White Review describes the book as "an exploration of Lacan's famous aphorism that 'a letter always arrives at its destination'".
