= Compact (American magazine) =

Online political magazine

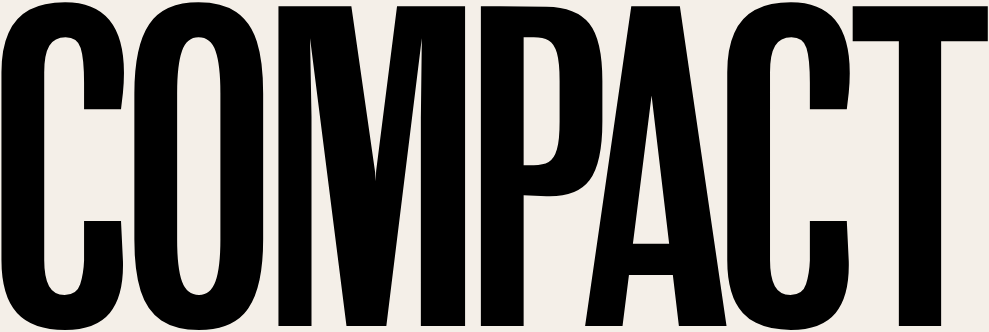
- Editor: Matthew Schmitz
- Categories: Culture, politics
- Founder: Sohrab Ahmari, Edwin Aponte, and Matthew Schmitz
- Founded: 2022
- Country: United States
- Language: English
- Website: www.compactmag.com

Compact is an American online magazine that began operating in March 2022. The magazine was co-founded by Edwin Aponte, a populist and founder of the online magazine The Bellows; Matthew Schmitz, previously an editor of the ecumenical religious journal First Things; and conservative Catholic opinion journalist Sohrab Ahmari.

When Compact was launched, its listed contributors and contributing editors were described by The New York Times as ideologically diverse, including religiously conservative Catholics, populists, and dissident Marxist feminists. The magazine's editorial line has been critical of liberalism from both the left and the right.

== History ==
Planning for the launch of the Compact began in 2020 between Ahmari and Schmitz, who later incorporated Aponte on the condition that half of the site's content cover "material concerns". Compact launched without a paywall for its first few weeks, then adopted a reader-funded model, requiring a paid subscription to access content on the site. Aponte exited the magazine in late 2022 over political differences after the U.S. Supreme Court decision Dobbs v. Jackson Women's Health Organization was leaked to the public.

In 2024, Vanity Fair reported that George Soros’s Open Society Foundations (OSF) have provided financial support to Compact. In 2023, OSF awarded Compact magazine $200,000. Co-founder Aponte told Vanity Fair that original funders included entrepreneur and political activist Peter Thiel (although Thiel denied this) and Thomas Klingenstein, chair of the board of the Claremont Institute.

== Positions ==
The magazine's website states that it "seeks to advance a governing consensus devoted to the common good." In 2022, Stephanie Slade, writing in Reason, described it as the new home of post-liberalism, whose editors espouse "intense religious conservatism [with] a whiff of socialism". Slade wrote: "By bringing a 'labor populism' with deep roots in the socialist tradition and a 'political Catholicism' that questions the very separation of church and state under a single roof, Compact has built an intellectual meeting place not just for post-liberal conservatives but for anti-liberals of every stripe". According to Danny Postel, writing in New Lines Magazine in 2023, its approach is a "synthesis of communitarian conservatism and social democracy". According to Matt McManus, writing in Jacobin in 2023, it is "an ideologically syncretic outlet in the spirit of Christopher Lasch". McManus further wrote that "Compact's ambition is to argue for a strong social democratic state that also resists libertine ideologies and upholds local, national, familial, and religious communities". Washington Monthly summarized its position as "populist economics and paleoconservative values". In 2024, Vanity Fair described Compact as illberal, giving the examples that it favorably covers Viktor Orbán's authoritarian policies in Hungary, criticizes the liberal concept of the open society. Politico noted that it has "assertively promoted" both Donald Trump and JD Vance.

== Contributors ==
In 2022, the magazine included columnists such as Christopher Caldwell, Lee Smith, Malcom Kyeyune, and Nina Power; and contributing editors including Adrian Vermeule, Glenn Greenwald, Liel Leibovitz, Michael Tracey, Patrick Deneen, Paul Embery, and Slavoj Žižek. Other notable contributors include Curtis Yarvin.
