= List of people from Ljubljana =

This is a list of notable individuals who were born or lived in Ljubljana:

Coats of arms of Ljubljana

== Authors ==
- Anton Aškerc (1856–1912), poet
- Vladimir Bartol (1903–1967), author
- Adam Bohorič (1520–1598), Protestant preacher, author and philologist
- Peter Božič (1932–2009), writer, playwright, journalist, and politician
- Ivan Cankar (1876–1918), writer, playwright, and essayist
- Peter Čeferin (born 1938), attorney, writer, playwright
- Aleš Debeljak (1961–2016), poet, essayist and sociologist
- Anton Funtek (1862–1932), writer, poet, editor and translator
- Alojz Gradnik (1882–1967), poet
- Drago Jančar (born 1948), writer and essayist
- Jože Javoršek (1920–1990), author, essayist, playwright and translator
- Taras Kermauner (1930–2008), literary historian and essayist
- Mile Klopčič (1905–1984), poet and translator
- Edvard Kocbek (1904–1981), poet, essayist, writer and politician
- Srečko Kosovel (1904–1926), poet
- Ferdo Kozak (1894–1957), writer, playwright, and politician
- Juš Kozak (1892–1964), writer
- Primož Kozak (1929–1981), playwright and essayist
- Taja Kramberger (born 1970), poet, essayist and anthropologist
- Anton Tomaž Linhart (1756–1795), playwright and historian
- Janez Menart (1929–2004), poet and translator
- Josip Murn (1879–1901), poet
- Lili Novy (1885–1958), poet
- Iztok Osojnik (born 1951), poet
- Marko Pohlin (1735–1801), author, philologist
- France Prešeren (1800–1849), poet
- Alenka Puhar (born 1945), columnist, historian, political activist
- Samo Resnik (1962–2011), Slovenian journalist, essayist, political activist, writer and poet
- Tomaž Šalamun (1941–2014), poet
- Mirca Župnek Sancin (1901–1970), composer
- Dominik Smole (1929–1992), writer and playwright
- Bojan Štih (1923–1986), stage director, literary critic and essayist
- Gregor Strniša (1930–1987), poet and playwright
- Veno Taufer (1933–2023), poet
- Ivan Tavčar (1851–1923), writer, editor and politician
- Igor Torkar (1913–2004), writer and playwright
- Primož Trubar (1508–1586), Protestant preacher and writer
- Josip Vidmar (1895–1992), literary critic, essayist and politician
- Anton Vodnik (1901–1956), poet, art historian, and critic
- France Vodnik (1903–1986), literary critic, essayist, translator and poet
- Valentin Vodnik (1758–1819), poet
- Demetrio Volčič (1931–2021), Slovenian-Italian journalist
- Constant von Wurzbach (1818–1893), Austrian biographer
- Dane Zajc (1929–2005), poet
- Vitomil Zupan (1914–1987), writer
- Oton Župančič (1872–1949), poet and playwright

== Architects and visual artists ==
- Aleksa Ivanc Olivieri (1916–2010), Slovenian painter, graphic designer and art restorer, who lived and worked in France
- Rihard Jakopič (1869–1943), painter
- Ivana Kobilca (1861–1926), painter
- Fredy Malec Koschitz(1914–2001), painter and woodcarver
- Zoran Mušič (1909–2005), painter
- Leopoldina Pelhan (1880–1947), Slovenian bobbin-lace maker, teacher of bobbin lace making, draughtswoman and designer
- Mira Pintar (1891–1980), Slovenian bank clerk, artist, and art collector
- Jože Plečnik (1872–1957), architect
- Edvard Ravnikar (1907–1993), architect
- Francesco Robba (1698–1757), Italian sculptor
- Jakob Savinšek (1922–1961), sculptor
- Carl Schütz (1745–1800), Austrian engraver and architect
- Barbara Jožefa Struss (1805 –1880), drawing teacher and painter
- Avgusta Šantel (1876–1968), painter, teacher and printmaker
- Vladimir Šubic (1894–1946), architect
- Damijan Stepančič (born 1969), Slovene painter and illustrator

== Statesmen, politicians, diplomats and religious leaders ==
- Juro Adlešič (1884–1962), politician, Mayor of Ljubljana
- Fran Albreht (1889–1963), Mayor of Ljubljana, poet
- Andrej Bajuk (1943–2011), Prime minister of Slovenia (2000)
- Joze Brilej (1910–1981), politician, diplomat, ambassador, chief justice of the supreme court of Slovenia until his death
- France Bučar (1923–2015), first Chairman of the Slovenian National Assembly (1990–1992)
- Carlos, Duke of Madrid (1848–1909), claimant to the Spanish throne.
- Philipp von Cobenzl (1741–1810), Austrian diplomat
- Etbin Henrik Costa (1831–1875), politician, Mayor of Ljubljana
- Karl Deschmann (1821–1889), Mayor of Ljubljana, historian
- Anton Füster (1808–1881), Austrian radical activist
- Anastasius Grün (1806–1876), liberal politician and poet.
- Ivan Hribar (1851–1941), politician and diplomat, mayor of Ljubljana
- Edvard Kardelj (1910–1979), Communist leader
- Boris Kidrič (1912–1953), Communist leader
- Ciril Kotnik (1895–1948), Yugoslav diplomat and anti-fascist hero
- Milivoj Lajovic (1921–2008), Australian politician
- Janez Potočnik (born 1958), European Commissioner
- Ciril Ribičič (born 1947), politician, jurist, and author
- Anton Rop (born 1960), politician
- Dimitrij Rupel (born 1946), politician and writer
- Marjan Šarec (born 1977), Slovene prime minister
- Matjaž Šinkovec (born 1951), diplomat, author, translator and politician
- Sergiy Verigin (1868–1938), clergyman
- Gregor Virant (born 1969), public servant and politician

== Performing artists ==
- Josipina Eleonora Hudovernik (1863–1945), nun, music teacher, headmistress and composer
- Bojan Adamič (1912–1995), composer, conductor, photographer
- Maks Bajc (1919–1983), actor
- Leo Funtek (1885–1965), violinist, conductor, arranger and music professor
- Jarmila Gerbič (1877–1964), Slovenian soprano, opera singer, concert vocalist and music teacher
- Johann Berthold von Höffer (1667–1718), nobleman and composer
- Željko Ivanek (born 1957), actor
- Lina Kuduzović (born 2002), child singer
- Dragica Legat Košmerl (1883–1956), Slovenian zither player, zither teacher, and composer
- Peter Lovšin (born 1955), rock icon, singer, writer
- Ula Ložar (born 2002), child singer
- Ana Roner Lavrič (1869–1957), Slovenian organist
- Dubravka Tomšič Srebotnjak (born 1940), pianist and music teacher
- Zlatko Šugman (1932–2008), actor
- DJ Umek (born 1976), deejay and music producer

== Scientists and academics ==
- Robert Blinc (1933–2011), physicist
- Katja Boh (1929–2008), sociologist, politician and diplomat
- Miran Božovič (born 1957), philosopher
- Bibijana Čujec (1926-2022), physicist
- Božidar Debenjak (born 1935), philosopher
- Mladen Dolar (born 1952), philosopher
- Joannes Disma Floriantschitsch de Grienfeld (1691–1757), Carniolan astronomer, mathematician, geographer, and cartographer
- Bogo Grafenauer (1916–1995), historian
- Jovan Hadži (1884–1972), zoologist
- Hermann Haus (1925–2003), scientist
- Peter Jambrek (born 1940), jurist, sociologist, and public intellectual
- Taras Kermauner (1930–2008), literary historian and essayist
- Milan Komar (1921–2006), philosopher
- Emil Korytko (1813–1839), Polish philologist and ethnographer
- Janko Kos (born 1931), literary historian, theoretician, and critic
- Milos Krofta (1912–2002), Slovenian engineer and businessman
- Ernst Mally (1879–1944), philosopher
- Vasilij Melik (1921–2009), historian
- Tamara Griesser Pečar (born 1947), historian
- Anton Peterlin (1908–1993), physicist
- Fritz Pregl (1869–1930), chemist, Nobel Prize winner
- Janko Prunk (born 1942), historian
- Rado Riha (born 1948), philosopher
- Renata Salecl (born 1961), philosopher, sociologist, legal theorist and columnist
- Vasko Simoniti (born 1951), historian
- Marko Snoj (born 1959), linguist
- Janez Strnad (1934–2015), physicist and populariser of natural science
- Marija Šuštar (1905–1989), ethnochoreologist and folklorist
- Johann Gregor Thalnitscher (1655–1719), lawyer and historian
- Miha Tišler (1926–2021), chemist
- Gregor Tomc (born 1952), sociologist and musician
- Milan Vidmar (1885–1962), electrical engineer, chess player and philosopher
- Josef Kalasanz von Erberg (1771–1843), botanist, historian, and collector
- Johann Weikhard von Valvasor (1641–1693), scholar, polymath, member of the Royal Society
- Egon Zakrajšek (1941–2002), mathematician and computer scientist
- Slavko Ziherl (1945–2012), psychiatrist
- Slavoj Žižek (born 1949), sociologist and philosopher
- Sigismund Zois (1747–1819), natural scientist
- Alenka Zupančič (born 1966), philosopher

== Athletes ==
- Milenko Ačimovič (born 1977), football player
- Pia Babnik (born 2004), golfer
- Alenka Bikar (born 1974), track and field
- David Brekalo (born 1998), football player
- Brigita Bukovec (born 1970), track and field
- Miro Cerar (born 1963), gymnast
- Boštjan Cesar (born 1982), football player
- Ivo Daneu (born 1937), basketball player
- Luka Dončić (born 1999), NBA basketball player for the Los Angeles Lakers
- Goran Dragić (born 1986), NBA basketball player for the Milwaukee Bucks
- Zoran Dragić (born 1989), NBA basketball player
- Marko Elsner (1960–2020), football player
- Luka Gregorc (born 1984), ATP tennis player
- Samir Handanović (born 1984), football player
- Urška Hrovat (born 1974), alpine skier
- Tomaz Humar (1969–2009), mountaineer
- Kaja Juvan (born 2000), tennis player
- Srečko Katanec (1981–1994), football player
- Jaka Lakovič (born 1978), basketball player
- Zlatan Ljubijankič (born 1983), football player
- Erazem Lorbek (born 1984), basketball player
- Petra Majdic (born 1979), Nordic skier
- Maksimilijan Mihelčič (1905–1958), football player
- Radoslav Nesterovič (born 1976), NBA basketball player
- Džoni Novak (born 1969), football player
- Milivoje Novakovič (born 1979), football player
- Brane Oblak (1965–1985), football player
- Jan Oblak (born 1993), football player
- Aljaž Pegan (born 1974), gymnast
- Janez Perme (born 1982), retired Slovenian footballer
- Mitja Petkovšek (born 1977), gymnast
- Rok Petrovič (1966–1993), alpine skier
- Tadej Pogačar (born 1998), cyclist
- Mateja Svet (born 1968), alpine skier
- Andraž Šporar (born 1994), football player
- Jurij Tepeš (born 1989), ski jumper
- Miran Tepeš (born 1961), ski jumper
- Sašo Udovič (born 1968), football player
- Primož Ulaga (born 1962), ski jumper
- Haris Vučkić (born 1992), football player
- Aljoša Žorga (born 1947), basketball player

== People who lived in Ljubljana temporarily ==
- Miodrag Bulatović (1930–1991), Serb-Montenegrin writer
- Eugène de Beauharnais (1781–1824), Viceroy of Italy
- Gabriel Gruber (1740–1805), Austrian Jesuit and engineer
- Antonija Höffern (1803–1871), Slovene noblewoman and educator
- Emil Korytko (1813–1839), Polish ethnographer, philologist and translator
- Gustav Mahler (1860–1911), Austrian composer
- Charles Nodier (1780–1844), French author
- Joseph Radetzky (1766–1858), Austrian general
- Mirko Ramovš (1935–2023), Slovene ethnochoreologist
- Boris Sket (1936–2023), Slovenian zoologist and speleobiologist
- Frančiška Urbančič Štebi (1884–after 1968), Slovenian teacher and first Slovenian woman to graduate from a Slovenian high school with permission to enroll at a university
