= List of Slovene philosophers =

Slovene philosophy includes philosophers who were either Slovenes or came from what is now Slovenia.

== Medieval philosophy ==
- Herman of Carinthia (c. 1100 – c. 1160)

== Renaissance ==
- Matija Hvale (Latinized: Matthias Qualle) (1470–1518)

== Enlightenment ==
- Anton Ambschel (1746–1821)
- Franc Samuel Karpe (1747–1806)

== 19th-century philosophy ==
=== Laical philosophy ===
- Anton Füster (1808–1881)

=== Neo-Scholasticists ===
- Anton Mahnič (1850–1920)
- Aleš Ušeničnik (1868–1952)

== 20th-century philosophy ==
=== Post-World War II philosophy ===
==== Phenomenologists ====
- Ivo Urbančič (born 1930)
- Tine Hribar (born 1941)
- Dean Komel (born 1960)

==== Personalists ====
- Edvard Kocbek (1904–1981)
- Edvard Kovač (born 1950)

==== Marxists ====
- Božidar Debenjak (born 1935)
- Lev Kreft (born 1951)

==== Lacanians and critical theorists ====
- Slavoj Žižek (born 1949)
- Renata Salecl (born 1962)
- Mladen Dolar (born 1951)
- Rastko Močnik (born 1944)
- Rado Riha (born 1948)
- Jelica Šumič Riha (born 1958)
- Alenka Zupančič (born 1966)
