= Continent (journal) =

- Discipline: Philosophy, Media Studies, Communication Studies
- Language: English
- Edited by: Jamie Allen, Paul Boshears, Bernhard Garnicnig

Publication details
- History: 2010-present
- Open access: Yes

Standard abbreviations
- ISO 4: Continent

Indexing
- ISSN: 2159-9920

Links
- Journal homepage

Continent (styled as continent.) is an online open access scholarly journal founded in 2010 that publishes a range of subjects including philosophy, literature, and arts. The journal is listed in the Directory of Open Access Journals and has received a seal of approval from SPARC Europe. The Editors are supported by Contributing Editors Ben Segal, Feliz Lucia Molina, Sherrin Frances, Fintan Neylan, Frederick Arias, Rosemary Lee, Isaac Linder, John Gallic, Matt Bernico and Sophie Wagner.

Continent is published under a Creative Commons license using a modified version of Open Journal Systems being developed between Jamie Allen and Bernhard Garnicnig, and its advisory board comprises:

- Simon Critchley, The New School for Social Research, New York
- Christopher Fynsk, The Centre for Modern Thought
- Erin Manning, Concordia University
- Ben Marcus, Columbia University
- Todd May, Clemson University
- J. Hillis Miller, University of California Irvine
- Lucia Santaella, São Paulo Catholic University
- Clay Shirky, New York University

== Indexing ==
The journal is indexed by The Philosophers' Index.

== Events ==
Continent participated in the BABEL 2012 post-medieval conference "Cruising in the ruins: the question of disciplinarity in the post/medieval university" at Northeastern University in Boston and presented a panel called All In A Jurnal's Work: A BABEL Wayzgoose critiquing and questioning the idea of the academic journal. Continent also appeared at the University of Basel's "Aesthetics in the 21st Century" conference in September 2012.

In June 2013, Continent sponsored its first academic conference in Tirana, Albania. Organized by Adam Staley Groves of the National University of Singapore, Vincent W.J. van Gerven Oei of the University of New York in Tirana, and Nico Jenkins of Husson University and the Honors College at the University of Maine, and entitled Pedagogies of the Disaster, the three-day conference featured keynote presentations by Chris Fynsk of the University of Aberdeen, Judith Balso of the Collège International de Philosophie, Paris; European Graduate School, Saas-Fee, Oliver Feltham of the American University of Paris, and Andreas Vrahimis of the University of Cyprus. The conference sought to interrogate and challenge both the idea of teaching as well as being taught, and a catalogue of the event is available from punctum books.
