= Stepančić =

Stepančić is a South Slavic surname. Notable people with the surname include:

- Damijan Stepančič (born 1969), Slovene painter and illustrator
- Luka Stepančić (born 1990), Croatian handball player
