= Vače =

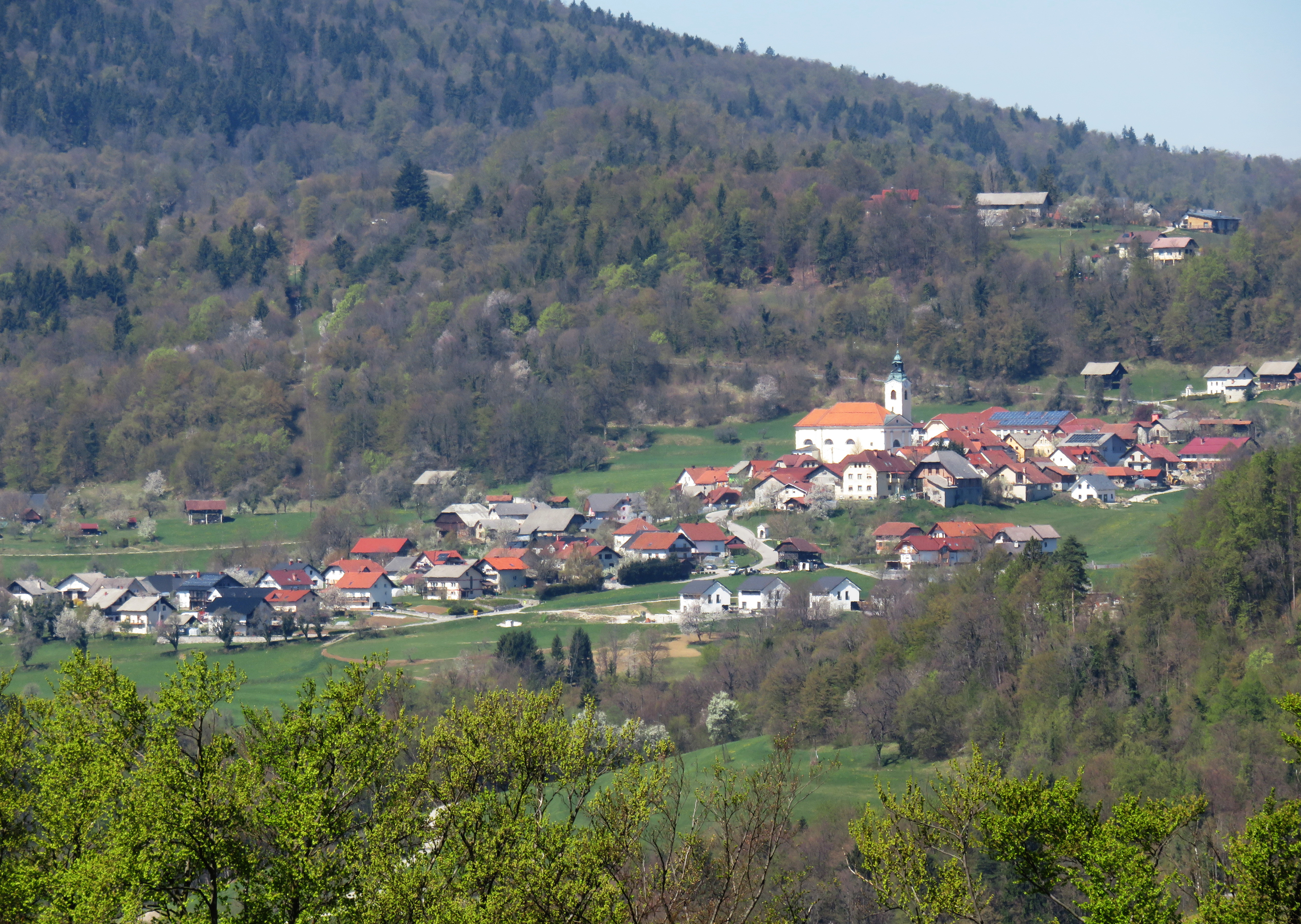

- Location in Slovenia
- Coordinates: 46°7′10.39″N 14°50′16.82″E
- Country: Slovenia
- Traditional region: Upper Carniola
- Statistical region: Central Sava
- Municipality: Litija

Area
  - Total: 1.75 km^{2} (0.68 sq mi)
- Elevation: 521.3 m (1,710 ft)

Population (2002)
  - Total: 312
- Postal code: 1252

Vače (pronounced [ˈʋaːtʃɛ]; German: Waatsch) is a settlement in the Municipality of Litija in central Slovenia. The area is part of the traditional region of Upper Carniola and is now included with the rest of the municipality in the Central Sava Statistical Region.

== Archaeological finds ==
The settlement is best known for the Hallstatt-period Vače situla (Slovene: situla z Vač, vaška situla), an archaeological treasure of Slovenia, which was discovered in neighboring Klenik in 1882. It is a bronze vessel with a triple figurative frieze. Another important find was the Vače belt-plate (pasna spona z Vač), also discovered in Klenik.

== Church ==
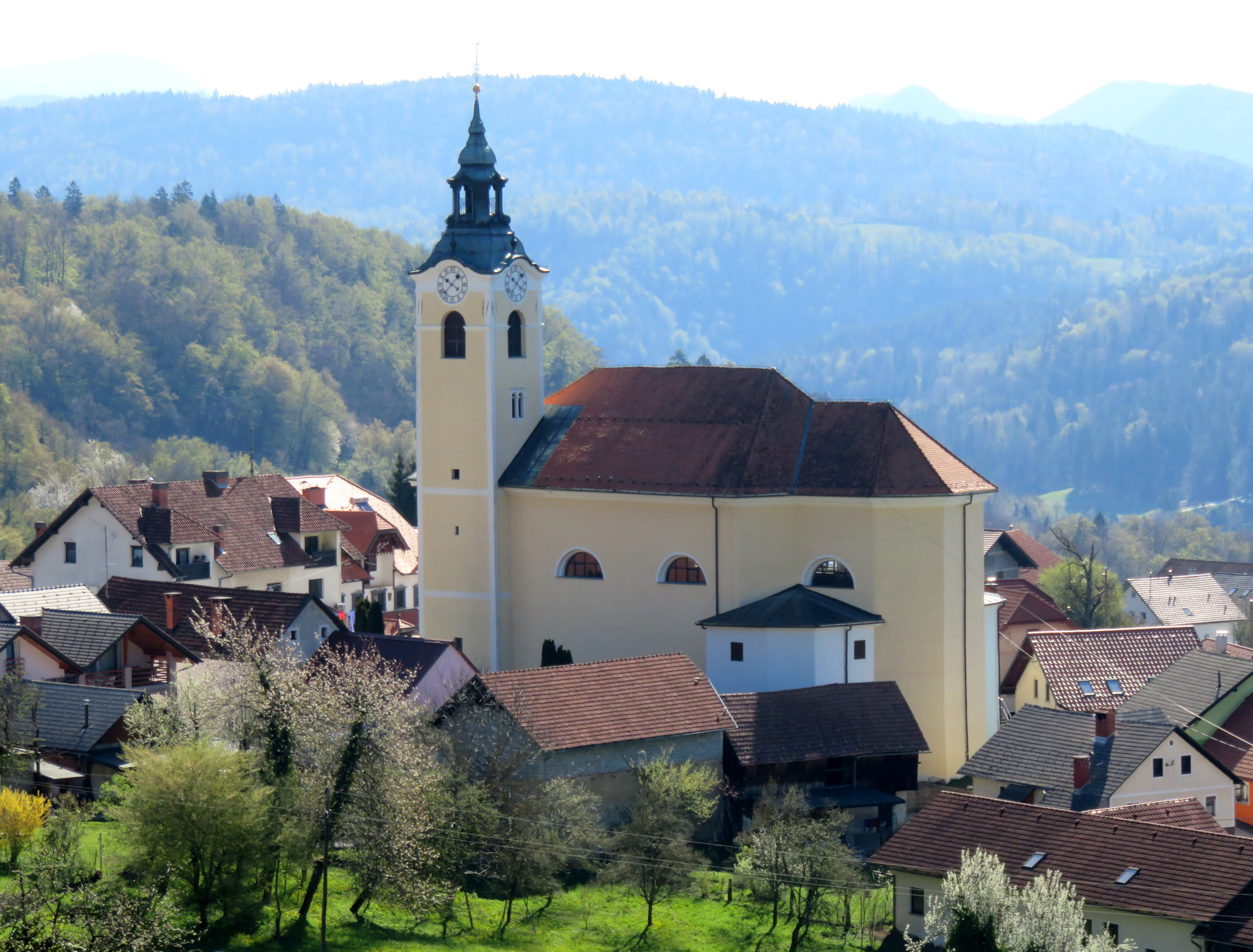
Saint Andrew's Church

The local parish church is dedicated to Saint Andrew and belongs to the Roman Catholic Archdiocese of Ljubljana. It was built in 1844 on the site of an earlier building that was destroyed by fire.

== Notable people from Vače ==
- Matthias Qualle (1470–1518), Slovene philosopher

== Gallery ==
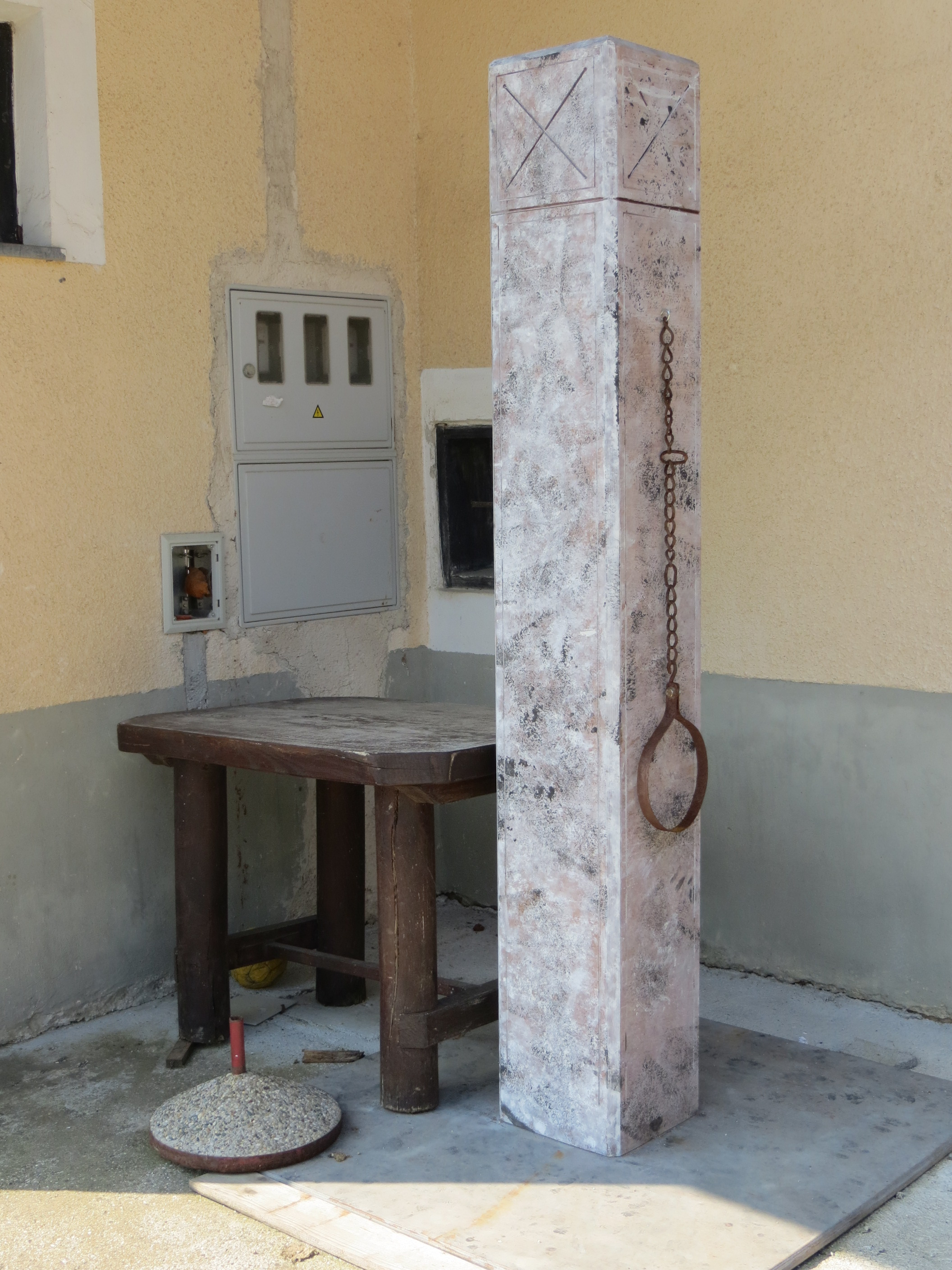
Pillory

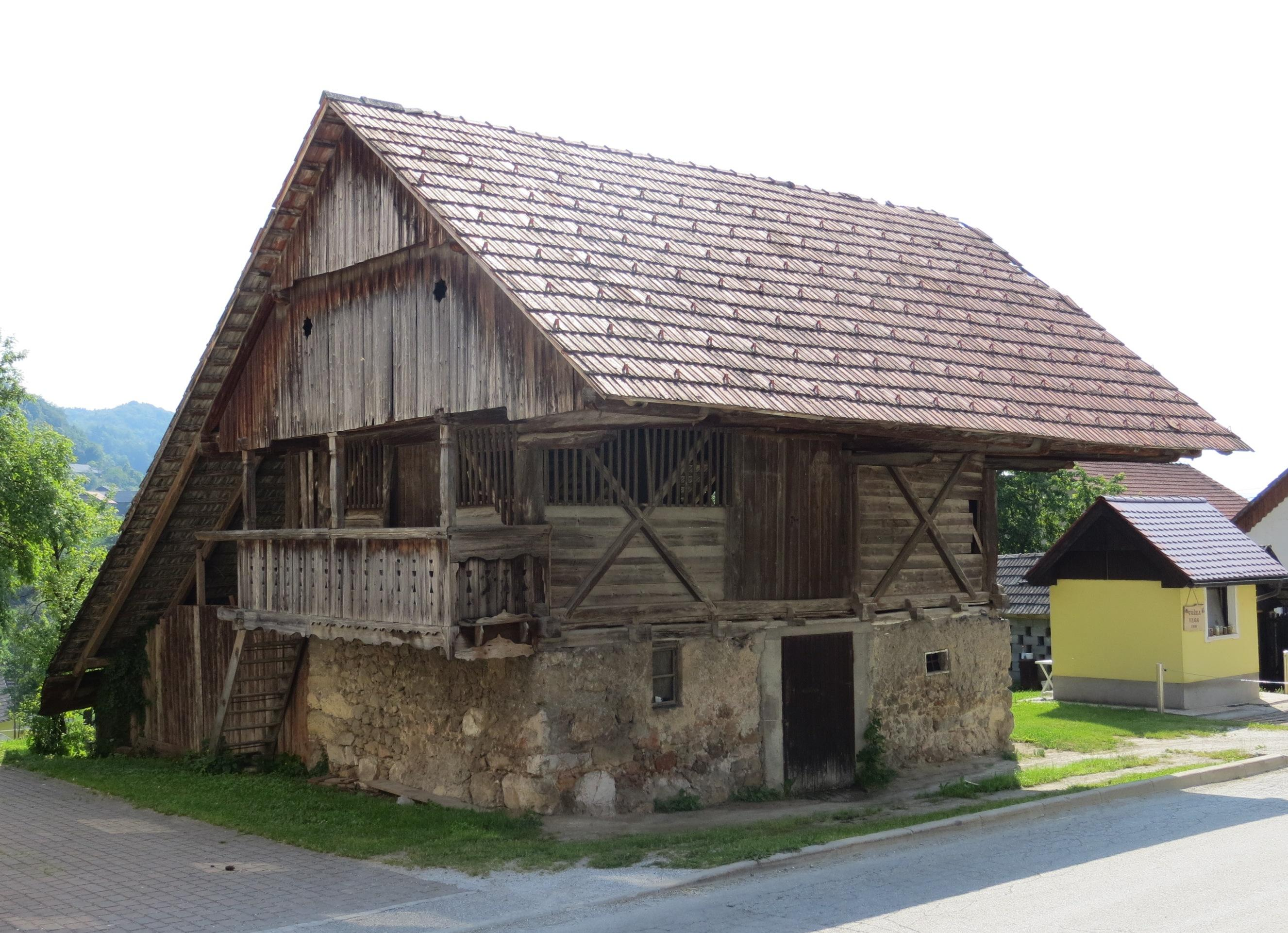
Traditional building
