= Agon Hamza =

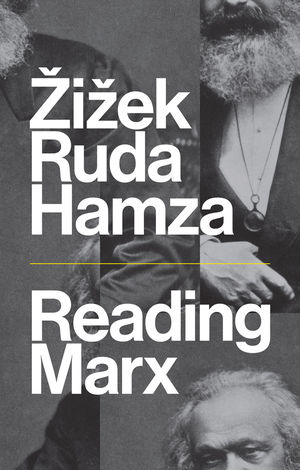
Reading Marx (2018), cover page

Agon Hamza (born 1984) is a philosopher and a political theorist from Kosovo. Influenced by Žižek and his readings of German Idealism, Marx and Marxist tradition in general; his work develops further the Hegelian-Marxist concepts of state, religion and politics. He is the author of Althusser and Pasolini: Philosophy, Marxism and Film (2016) and the co-author of Reading Marx (2018) and Reading Hegel (2021) alongside Slavoj Žižek and Frank Ruda, as well as From Myth to Symptom: The Case of Kosovo (2013) with Slavoj Žižek.

He is the founder and co-editor-in-chief of the international journal of political thought and philosophy Crisis and Critique.

== Life ==
Hamza is an Assistant professor of political philosophy at Institute of Social Sciences and Humanities, in Skopje, North Macedonia. He briefly served as political advisor to the Prime Minister of the Republic of Kosovo, Albin Kurti, in 2020. He received his Ph.D. in 2017 from The Research Center of the Slovenian Academy of Sciences and Arts (ZRC SAZU), under the supervision of Jelica Šumič Riha on the work of the French Marxist philosopher Louis Althusser. He is a regular contributor to a daily newspaper in Kosovo, and contributed from 2020 to 2021 to the Philosophical Salon in a monthly feature, "The R-Files” (short for “The Review Files”), with Frank Ruda. He has written for Al-Jazeera, Los Angeles Review of Books (LARB).

== Works ==
- Repeating Žižek. Durham: Duke University Press. 2015
- Slavoj Žižek and Dialectical Materialism. Basingstoke, Palgrave Macmillan. 2016 (with Frank Ruda)
- Althusser and Theology: Religion, Politics and Philosophy. Leiden, Brill, 2016
- Althusser and Pasolini: Philosophy, Marxism, and Film. Basingstoke, Palgrave Macmillan. 2016/2018
- Reading Marx. (with Slavoj Žižek and Frank Ruda) London, Polity Press, 2018.
- Reading Hegel. (with Slavoj Žižek and Frank Ruda) London, Polity Press, 2021.

== See also ==
- Hegelian Marxism
