= Hallstatt Archaeological Site in Vače =

Archaeological site in Klenik, Slovenia

The Hallstatt Archaeological Site in Vače is an Eastern Hallstatt archaeological site in Klenik, a village near Vače on the border between the Styria and Lower Carniola regions in central-eastern Slovenia. It is best known for the Vače Situla, one of the most notable archaeological treasures of Slovenia.

== Investigations ==
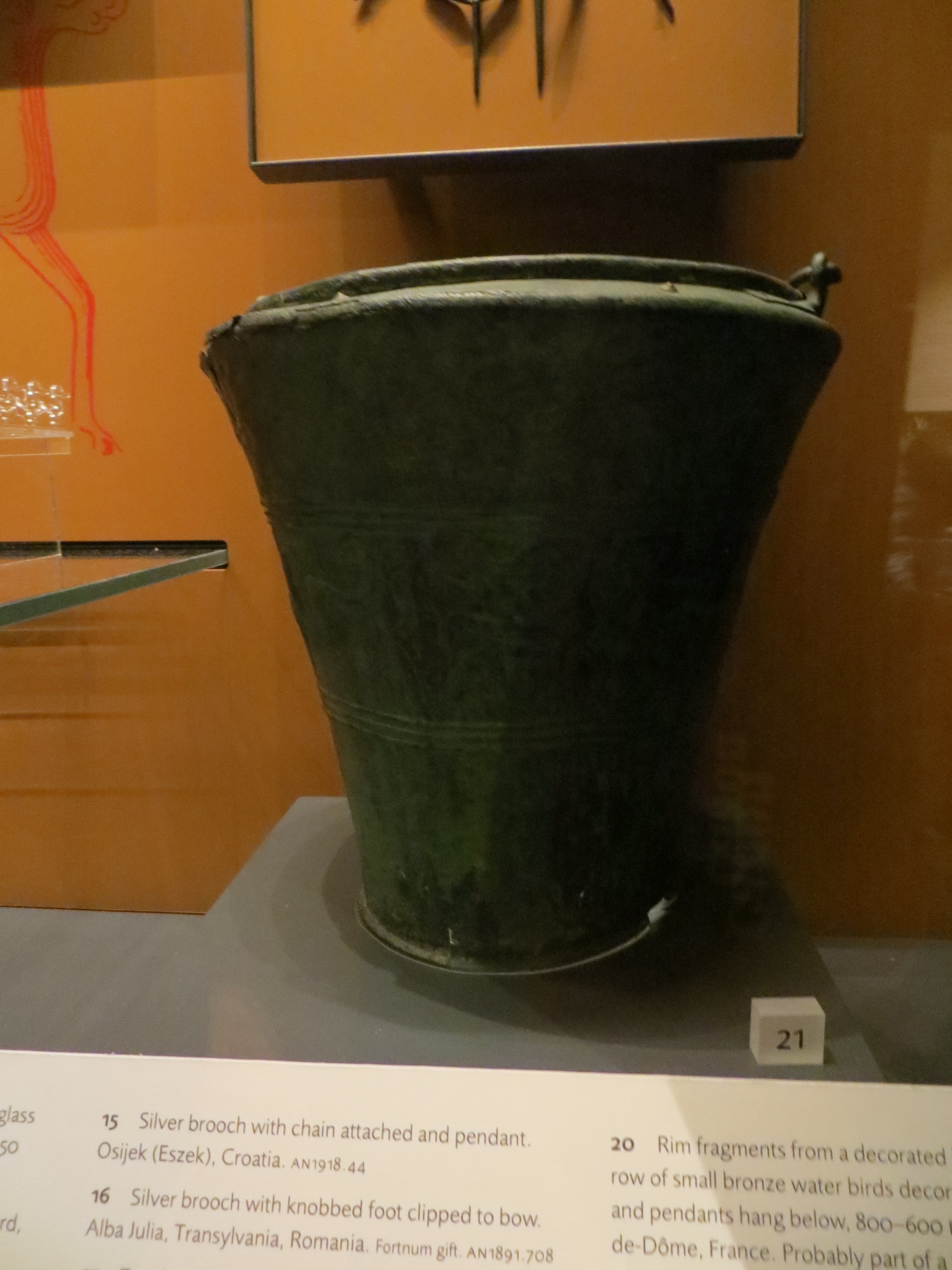
Situla from Vače archaeological site in the Ashmolean Museum, Oxford

Archaeological investigations near Vače—north of Klenik and east of Slemšek Hill (680 metres or 2,230 feet)—revealed foundations of a number of houses and graves from an Iron Age Illyrian settlement. Local farmers found the first graves at the site in 1877, and organized excavations began in 1878 under Karel Dežman, Ferdinand Schulz (1849–1936), and Ferdinand von Hochstetter. Prince Ernst Windischgrätz (1827–1918) directed excavations from 1879 to 1881, followed by the Academy of Sciences in Vienna in 1881.

In 1882, the Vače Situla was found in the Ronkar Ravines (Slovene: Ronkarjeve drage, part of Klenik) by the local farmer Janez Grilc from the Pleze Farm, who sold it to Provincial Museum of Carniola.

Further excavations were carried out by Princess Marie of Windisch-Graetz in 1905, 1907, and 1913, by Walter Schmid (1875–1951) from 1932 to 1935, and by France Stare (1924–1974) in 1945.

== Museums ==
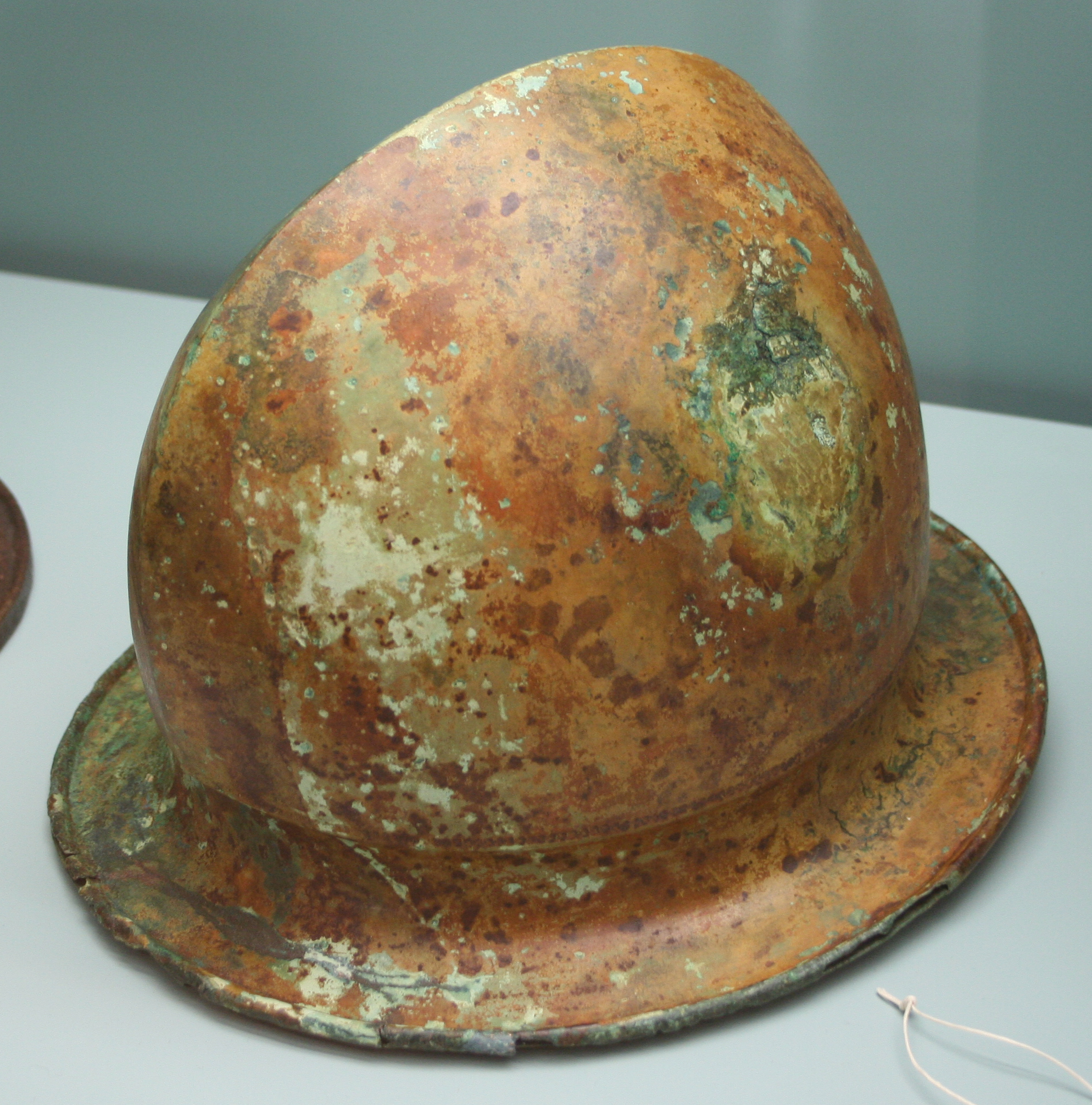
A Negau helmet excavated at the site. Kept by Museum of Prehistory and Early History (Berlin)

Most of artifacts, that were excavated at the site, are now part of the collections of the National Museum of Slovenia in Ljubljana, and the National History Museum in Vienna. Some of them were sold to museums in Harvard, Oxford and Berlin by Duchess Marie Antoinette of Mecklenburg, a daughter of the princess who surveyed some excavations. Those are now kept by museums in Graz, Austria; Museum of Prehistory and Early History, Berlin, Germany; Ashmolean Museum, Oxford, UK; and Peabody Museum, Harvard, US.

== Local trail ==
A local archaeological trail with eleven stops and explanatory signs has been set up in nature, that includes the Iron Age cemeteries and an Iron Age settlement excavated there.
