= Klenik, Litija =

Settlement in Upper Carniola, Slovenia

Klenik
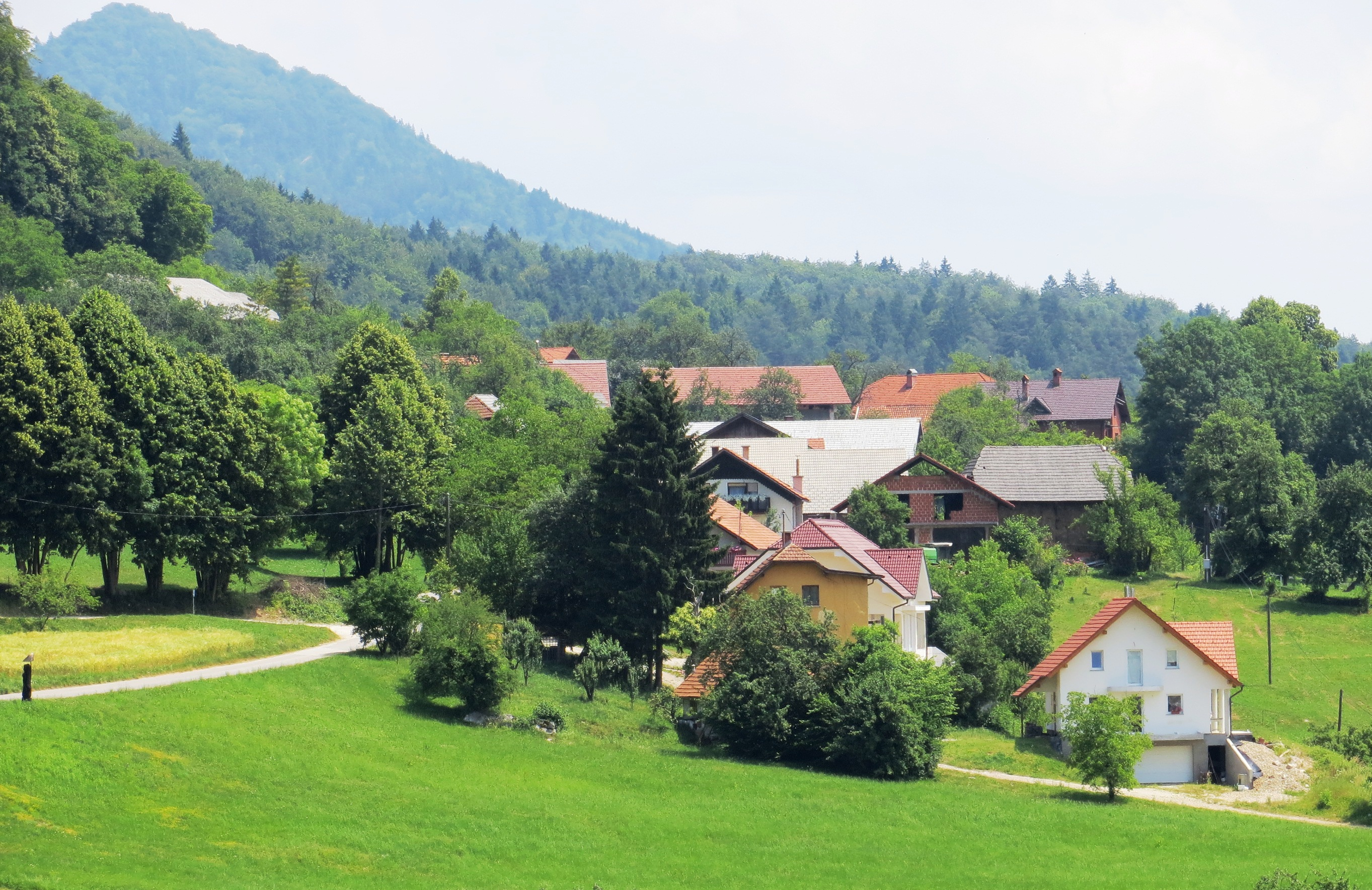

- Location in Slovenia
- Coordinates: 46°7′15.94″N 14°50′49.88″E
- Country: Slovenia
- Traditional region: Upper Carniola
- Statistical region: Central Sava
- Municipality: Litija

Area
  - Total: 1.16 km^{2} (0.45 sq mi)
- Elevation: 548.7 m (1,800 ft)

Population (2002)
  - Total: 65
- Postal code: 1252

Klenik (pronounced [ˈkleːnik]) is a settlement east of Vače in the Municipality of Litija in central Slovenia. The area is part of the traditional region of Upper Carniola. It is now included with the rest of the municipality in the Central Sava Statistical Region; until January 2014 the municipality was part of the Central Slovenia Statistical Region.

== Hallstatt Archaeological Site in Vače ==
North of Klenik and east of Slemšek Hill (680 metres or 2,230 feet), near Vače, is the Hallstatt Archaeological Site in Vače, where the Vače situla, one of the most notable archaeological treasures of Slovenia, was discovered in the Ronkar Ravines (Slovene: Ronkarjeve drage, part of Klenik).

== Church ==
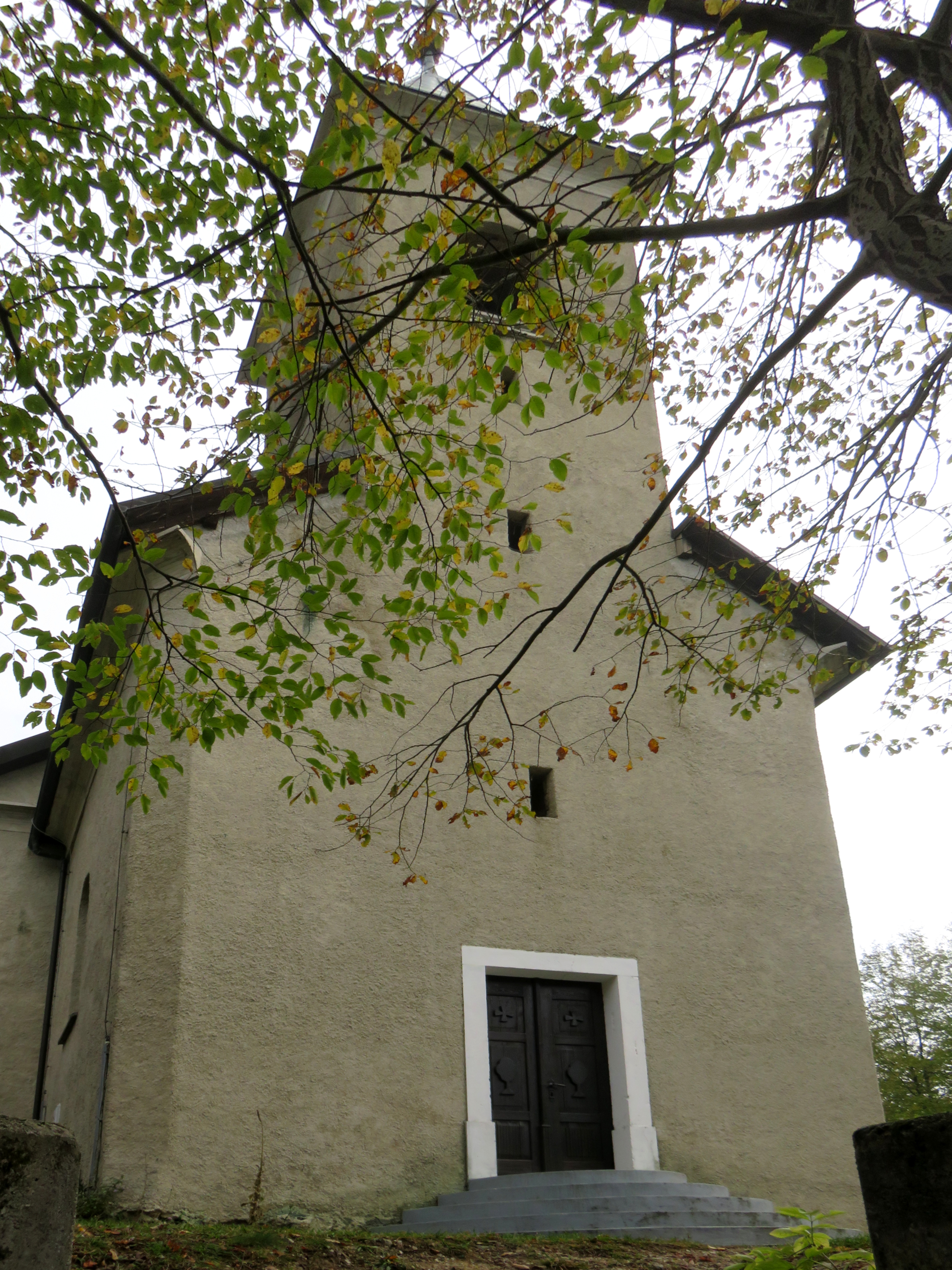
Holy Cross Church

The local church, which stands on Slemšek Hill, is dedicated to the Holy Cross and belongs to the Parish of Vače. It was restored in the 1990s. It was built in 1898 on the site of an earlier structure damaged in the 1895 earthquake. The furnishings date from 1906 and were created by the Ljubljana sculptor Andrej Rovšek Jr. (1864–1907).

== Notable people ==
Notable people that were born or lived in Klenik include:

- Franc Celestin (1843–1895), philosopher, literary historian, writer, and translator
