= Joachim Vadian =

Swiss humanist, scholar and mayor

Vadianus
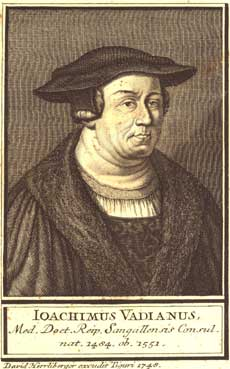
- Engraving by David Herrliberger from Zürich, 1748, after an older original
- Born: Joachim von Watt; 29 November 1484; St. Gallen, Abbey Principality of St. Gallen
- Died: 6 April 1551 (aged 66); St. Gallen, Abbey Principality of St. Gallen
- Other name: Joachim Vadian
- Occupations: Scholar, historian, editor
- Known for: Leading humanist scholar of the sixteenth century

Joachim Vadian (29 November 1484 – 6 April 1551), born as Joachim von Watt, was a humanist, scholar, mayor and reformer in the free city of St. Gallen.

== Biography ==
Vadian was born in St. Gallen into a family of wealthy and influential linen merchants. After having gone to school in St. Gallen, he moved to Vienna at the end of 1501, where he took up studies at faculty of arts the university, in particular under Conrad Celtis and Matthias Qualle.

In Vienna, he changed his name to Joachimus Vadianus; like so many other humanists, he preferred a Latin name to express his admiration for the classic masters. He evaded the outbreak of the bubonic plague of 1506/07 by moving to Villach where he worked as a teacher and studied music. A study trip through northern Italy brought him to Trent, Venice, and Padua, where he met the Irish scholar Mauritius Hibernicus.

In 1509 completed his studies with the degree of Master of Arts and returned for a short while to St. Gallen, where he studied the scriptures in the library of the abbey of St. Gall. He returned to Vienna, where he had some success as a writer. From 1512 on, he held the chair of poetry at the university of Vienna—he had gained some reputation as the author of Latin poems. In 1513, he visited Buda, and the following year, he was named poeta laureatus by emperor Maximilian I. In 1516, he was even named a Dean of the University of Vienna.

In the following years, Vadian studied medicine and sciences, in particular geography and history under Georg Tannstetter, called Collimitius. In 1517, he was graduated as a doctor of medicine, and subsequently moved back to his hometown, St. Gallen. On that voyage, he visited many of his humanist acquaintances in Leipzig, Breslau, and Kraków. In 1518, he climbed the Pilatus mountain near Lucerne, the first documented ascent to its top.

In St. Gallen, he was appointed city physician (Stadtarzt), and on 18 August 1519 he married Martha Grebel, the sister of Conrad Grebel who would later become a leading figure of the Anabaptist movement. In 1521, he succeeded his father Leonhard, who had died on 20 December 1520, as a member of the city council. The beginning of the Reformation in Switzerland (he was a friend of Huldrych Zwingli) made him, who had never had a theological schooling, study ecclesiastic texts. From 1522 on, he sided with the new, reformed interpretation and henceforth was its most important proponent in St. Gallen. When he was elected mayor of the city in 1526, he led the conversion of St. Gallen to Protestantism, and managed to maintain that new state even after the victory of the Catholic cantons in the Second War of Kappel. Vadian wrote several theological texts after 1522, helping disseminate the reformatory views.

He died in St. Gallen. In his testament, he donated his large private library to the city. His collection became the nucleus of the cantonal library of St. Gallen, which is named Vadiana.

== Selected works ==
- Vadian: De poetica et carminis ratione liber, Vienna 1518. A comprehensive work on the history of literature.

Modern critical edition with German translation in 3 vols: Joachim Vadianus, De Poetica by Peter Schäffer (Humanistische Bibliothek, Reihe II: Texte, 21, I-III). Wilhelm Fink, Munich 1973-1977, vol. 1 [ISBN unspecified]; vol. 2 ISBN 3-7705-1119-0; vol. 3 ISBN 3-7705-1120-4

- Vadian: Grosse Chronik der Äbte des Klosters St. Gallen, St. Gallen 1529. A history of the abbots of the abbey of St. Gallen.
- Vadian: Epitome trium terrae partium, Asiae, Africae et Europae..., Zürich 1534. A world atlas (one of the first to include America).
- Vadian: Aphorismorum de consideratione eucharistiae libri VI, St. Gallen 1535. A theological treatise arguing for the reformed interpretation of the eucharist as a symbolism.
