= Vače Belt-Plate =

Ancient bronze artwork

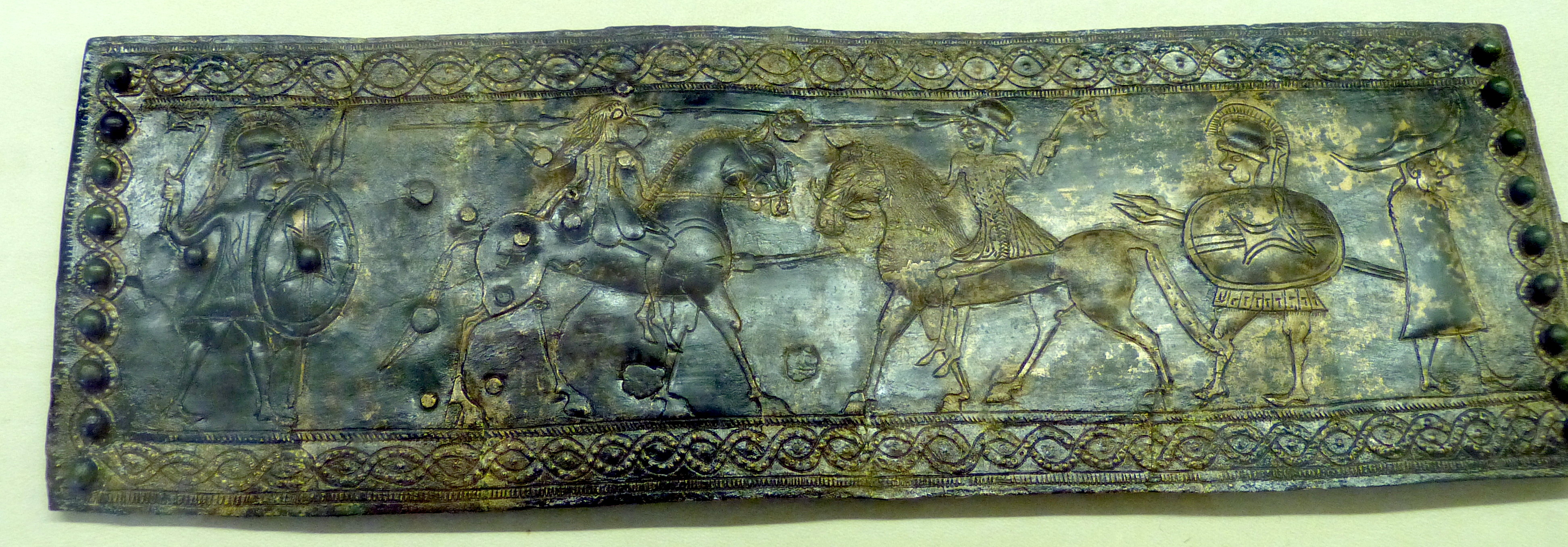
- Material: bronze
- Size: height: 28.5 cm (11.2 in)
- Created: 5th century BC
- Discovered: Hallstatt Archaeological Site in Vače, at the time Austria-Hungary (now Slovenia)
- Present location: Natural History Museum in Vienna

The Vače Belt-Plate (Slovene: pasna spona z Vač or vaška spona, German: Gürtelblech von Vače) is one of the best examples of Illyrian art and toreutic art.

== Discovery ==
The Vače Belt-Plate was discovered at the Hallstatt Archaeological Site in Vače, Slovenia, where several Illyrian situlae were found, the best known of which is the Vače Situla.

== The artifact ==
The belt-plate dates to the 5th century BC and is displayed at the Vienna Natural History Museum. It is 28.5 cm long and depicts five figures, four of which are warriors in combat. Two of the central warriors are on horseback. These may be depictions of mythological events.
