= Sha Xin Wei =

American academic

Sha Xin Wei is a media philosopher and professor at the School of Arts, Media + Engineering in the Herberger Institute for Design and the Arts + Ira A. Fulton Schools of Engineering and the School of Complex Adaptive Systems in the Global Futures College at Arizona State University. He has created ateliers such as the Synthesis Center at Arizona State University, the Topological Media Lab at Concordia University, and Weightless Studio in Montreal for experiential experiments and experimental experience.

He has served as Professor at the European Graduate School and New Centre for Research and Practice.

== Education and career ==
Sha Xin Wei was trained in Mathematics at Harvard University and Stanford University.

He obtained an interdisciplinary Ph.D. in 2001 on differential geometric performance and the technologies of writing in Mathematics, Computer Science, and History & Philosophy of Science at Stanford University.

Following his studies in mathematics, for more than a decade Sha worked in the fields of scientific computation, mathematical modeling, and the visualization of scientific data and geometric structures. In 1995, he extended his work to network media authoring systems and media theory, coordinating the Interaction and Media Group at Stanford University.

In the late '90s, Sha co-founded Pliant Research to explore adaptable technologies and launched the Sponge art group in San Francisco to create experimental performance art. His work has been featured at international venues like Ars Electronica, V2, and Postmasters Gallery.

Sha was assistant professor in the School of Literature, Communication and Culture at the Georgia Institute of Technology in Atlanta from 2001 to 2004.

He also established the Topological Media Lab for the study of gesture and improvisation of collectively meaningful movement from both experiential and computational media perspectives at the Graphics and Visualization and Usability Center in the College of Computing.

Previously, he served at Concordia University in Montreal, Canada as the Canada Research Chair in Media Arts and Sciences and as associate professor of Fine Arts and Computer Science. In 2005 he became the Director of Hexagram's Active Textiles and Wearable Computers Axis. During his time at Concordia University, he directed the Topological Media Lab as an atelier for the study of gesture, distributed agency, and materiality with application to the phenomenology of performance and the built environment. Sha has created anticipatory and participatory governance platforms for the United Nations Development Program’s Navigating Uncertainty simulations in seven countries and the Abductive Heuristics role playing simulations for heat scenarios with ASU’s Media and Immersive eXperience Center.

Sha has been a visiting scholar or faculty in History of Science at Harvard University as well as the Program in Science, Technology, and Society at The Massachusetts Institute of Technology (MIT), Centre for Modern Thought at King's College, Aberdeen, History and Philosophy of Science & Department of French and Italian at Stanford University. He is Senior Fellow with the ASU-Santa Fe Institute’s Center for Biosocial Complex Systems and Building21 at McGill University.

Since 2017 Sha has lectured at the European Graduate School on philosophy, media and alternate ecologies and economies.

He is a member of the editorial boards of the Artificial Intelligence and Society Journal, the Experimental Practices book series and the Architectural Intelligences book series with Rodopi Press, Inflexions, FibreCulture, and the International Journal of Creative Interfaces & Computer Graphics.

Sha has served on the governing boards of Alliance for the Arts in Research Universities, and Leonardo International Society for the Arts, Sciences and Technology.

Sha is the founder and director of Weightless Studio, an engineering and computational design studio specialized in the creation of innovative responsive environments and complex system simulations.

== Research and work ==
Sha's research integrates topological thinking with poiesis, play, and process across arts and sciences.

His work includes responsive environments, movement arts, gesture-based interaction, and media philosophy. He has published in fields ranging from human-computer interaction and wearable technology to experimental philosophy and science and technology studies.

He founded the Topological Media Lab at the Georgia Institute of Technology and later directed research at Concordia University in Montréal, where he was the first Canada Research Chair in Media Arts and Sciences.

== Artistic work ==
He is known for his work in media art, particularly in developing responsive environments that integrate gesture, movement, voice, and environmental elements. His installations often involve interdisciplinary collaboration and use time-based media to explore the relationship between human experience and built environments.

His notable projects include TGarden (2001–2002), created with the art research groups Sponge and FoAM. Exhibited at venues such as Ars Electronica (Austria), V2_ Institute for the Unstable Media (Netherlands), and Future Physical (UK), the work received support from organizations including the Daniel Langlois Foundation and the Rockefeller Foundation. In 2010, he co-created IL Y A, a multi-channel video membrane installation supported by the Fonds de recherche du Québec – Société et culture as part of a research program on spatial and temporal textures. In 2016, he directed Palimpsest Time Lenses, exhibited at the Musée des arts et métiers in Paris, which was part of the broader Synthesis Time Lenses series.

Other works include Membrane (2004), Ouija (2009), E-Sea (2008), and WYSIWYG: CIDZIY (2012), as well as media instruments developed for the performance Frankenstein’s Ghosts. His installations have been presented at international festivals including DEAF, Elektra, Medi@Terra, and eArts. He has also co-founded the research collectives Sponge (San Francisco) and Weightless (Montréal).

== Honors and awards ==
Sha's collective and individual art works have been recognized with awards from the Daniel Langlois Foundation for Art, Science, and Technology, the LEF Foundation, the Canada Foundation for Innovation, the Creative Work Fund (New York), the Rockefeller Foundation and the Social Sciences and Humanities Research Council of Canada.

== Selected publications ==
=== Books ===
- Sha, Xin Wei (2013). Poiesis and Enchantment in Topological Matter. The MIT Press Ser. Arkady Plotnitsky. Cambridge: MIT Press. ISBN 978-0-262-01951-4.

Articles

- Sha, Xin Wei (May 3, 2020). "The Square Root of Negative One is Imaginary". Angelaki. 25 (3): 64–82. doi:10.1080/0969725x.2020.1754023. ISSN 0969-725X.
- Lyu, Yanjun; Mechtley, Brandon; Hayes, Lauren; Sha, Xin Wei (2020), "Tableware: Social Coordination Through Computationally Augmented Everyday Objects Using Auditory Feedback", Lecture Notes in Computer Science, Cham: Springer International Publishing, pp. 332–349, doi:10.1007/978-3-030-59987-4_24, ISBN 978-3-030-59986-7
- Sha, Xin Wei; Freed, Adrian; Navab, Navid (April 27, 2013). "Sound design as human matter interaction". CHI '13 Extended Abstracts on Human Factors in Computing Systems. New York, NY, USA: ACM. pp. 2009–2018. doi:10.1145/2468356.2468718. ISBN 978-1-4503-1952-2.
- Sha, Xin Wei; Fortin, Michael; Navab, Navid; Sutton, Timothy (October 25, 2010). "Ozone: Continuous state-based media choreography system for live performance". Proceedings of the 18th ACM international conference on Multimedia. New York, NY, USA: ACM. pp. 1383–1392. doi:10.1145/1873951.1874221. ISBN 978-1-60558-933-6.
- Sha, Xin Wei; Fortin, Michael; Rousseau, Jean-Sébastien (October 19, 2009). "Calligraphic video: A phenomenological approach to dense visual interaction". Proceedings of the 17th ACM international conference on Multimedia. New York, NY, USA: ACM. pp. 1091–1100. doi:10.1145/1631272.1631518. ISBN 978-1-60558-608-3.
- Sha, Xin Wei; Gill, Satinder (2005). "Gesture and response in field-based performance". Proceedings of the 5th conference on Creativity & cognition - C&C '05. New York, New York, USA: ACM Press. p. 205. doi:10.1145/1056224.1056253. ISBN 1-59593-025-6.
- Sha, Xin Wei (2004). "Differential Geometrical Performance and Poiesis". Configurations. 12 (1): 133–160. doi:10.1353/con.2005.0007. ISSN 1080-6520.
- Sha, Xin Wei (2002). "Resistance Is Fertile: Gesture and Agency in the Field of Responsive Media". Configurations. 10 (3): 439–472. doi:10.1353/con.2004.0006. ISSN 1080-6520.
