= Vače Situla =

Early Iron Age ritual bronze vessel found in Slovenia

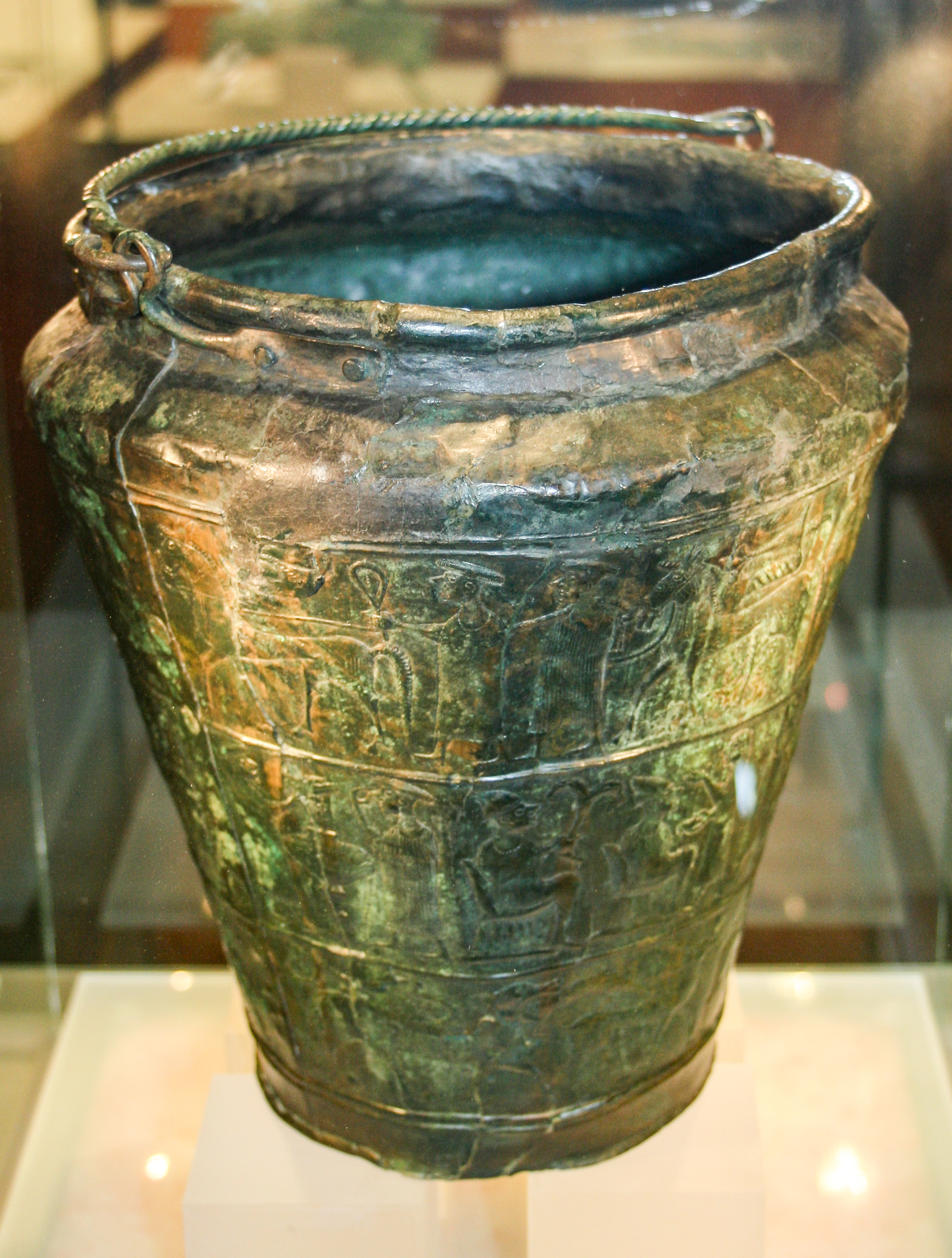
- Vače Situla, now on display in the National Museum of Slovenia

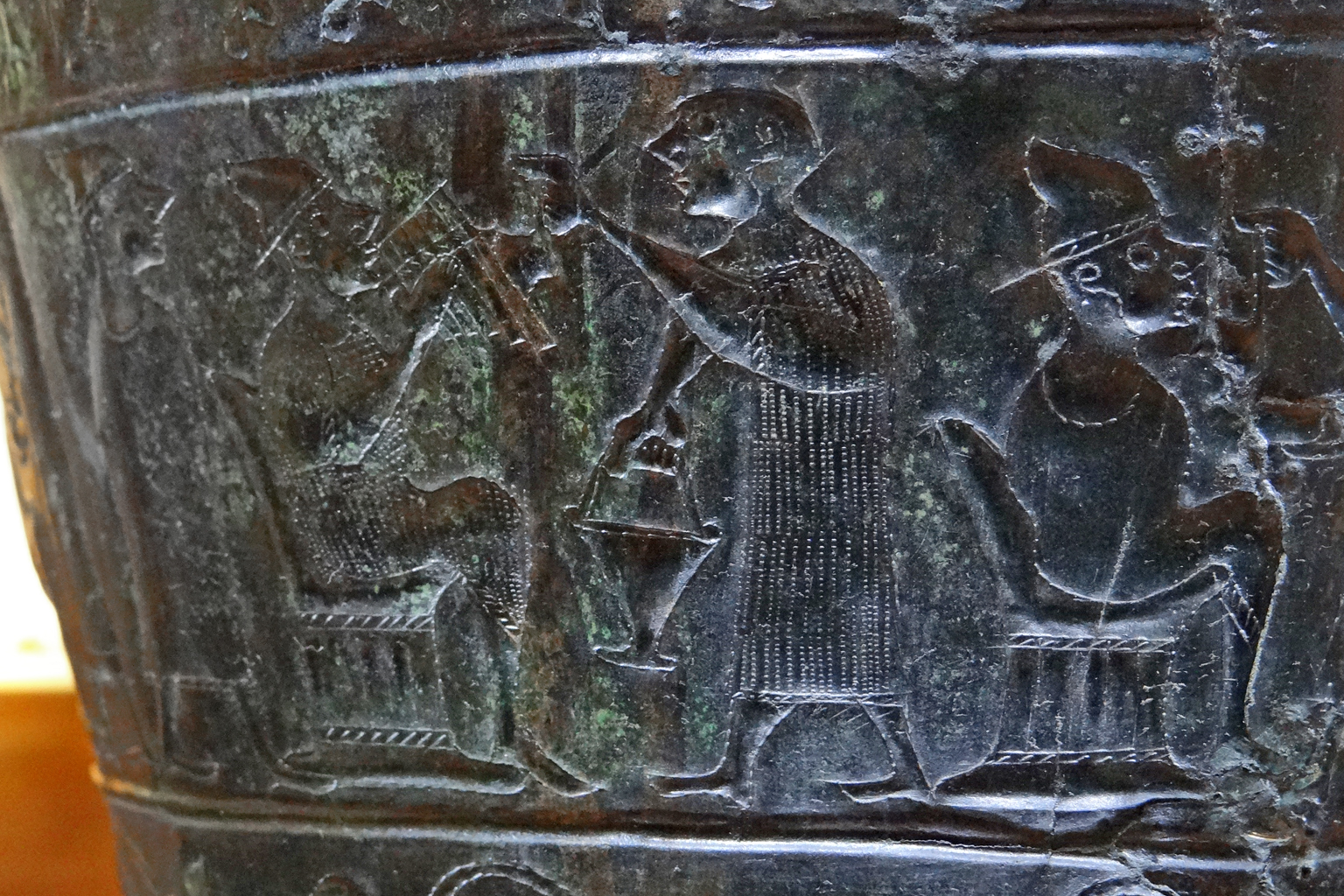
- Material: bronze
- Size: height: 23.8 cm (9.4 in)
- Created: 5th century BC
- Discovered: 1882 at Hallstatt Archaeological Site in Vače, at the time Austria-Hungary (now central Slovenia) by Janez Grilc
- Present location: National Museum of Slovenia

The Vače Situla (Slovene: situla z Vač, also vaška situla) is an ornamented Early Iron Age ritual bronze vessel (situla) found in the second half of the 19th century at the Hallstatt Archaeological Site in Vače in central Slovenia. It counts among the highest-quality such vessels in general and among the most precious archeological artifacts of the country. Dating from the 5th century BC, it is considered to be one of the oldest situla objects of the northern Illyrians found in the Eastern Hallstatt zone. The vessel has three rows of relief that show the ordinary life of the ruling class and also reflect the religious understanding of the world in that time. It is on display in the National Museum of Slovenia.

== Discovery ==
It was discovered by the farmer Janez Grilc in the beginning of 1882 (by oral tradition on 17 January, but most probably in March that year). The situla lay at a depth of 1.5 metres (4 feet 11 inches). In the same year, after the director of the Provincial Museum of Carniola (Kranjski deželni muzej), Karel Dežman, was informed about the find, it was purchased by a museum agent for 18 florins and 20 kreutzers. Later, the museum estimated its value at about 6,000 florins.

== Artifact ==
The situla is 23.8 centimetres (9.4 in) high and is made of three separate pieces of bronze sheets, coupled with bronze rivets. The holder is made of thick torqued wire and has the ends in the form of stylized duck's head. It was made in toreutic technique and may have been used as a ritual vessel for holding holy water. Its volume has been estimated to 2 litres (0.44 imp gal; 0.53 US gal).

== Friezes ==
The situla is decorated with three horizontally parallel rows of bas relief, showing warriors, ritual combat, and animals using small figures. The upper one shows a solemn procession of warriors on foot, on horses, and on two chariots. The middle one shows the main happening: at first a sacrifice of grain, followed by a celebration, with four worthies sitting on their thrones and each one receiving gifts from other men. This is followed by a scene showing ritual wrestling for a trophy (a pot helmet with a long crest). The bottom one shows eight animals in a row: the first one is a lion with a wolf's tail, devouring an animal leg, followed by three does and four ibexes. The upper two rows form a continuum, similar to an epic. The vessel's reliefs show influences of the Etruscan art.

== Legacy ==
The small figures taken from this situla are used as background graphics in the Slovenian passport and are shown enlarged five times on a bronze replica standing at the beginning of the local Vače archaeological trail, tours of which are led by a family theater group from Vače. Other important monuments along the archaeological trail are the Iron Age cemeteries in the Ronkar Ravines (Slovene: Ronkarjeve drage) and at the Reber, Nad Lazom, and Drage sites, with a former terrace settlement at the Spodnja Krona and Zgornja Krona sites.

== Gallery ==
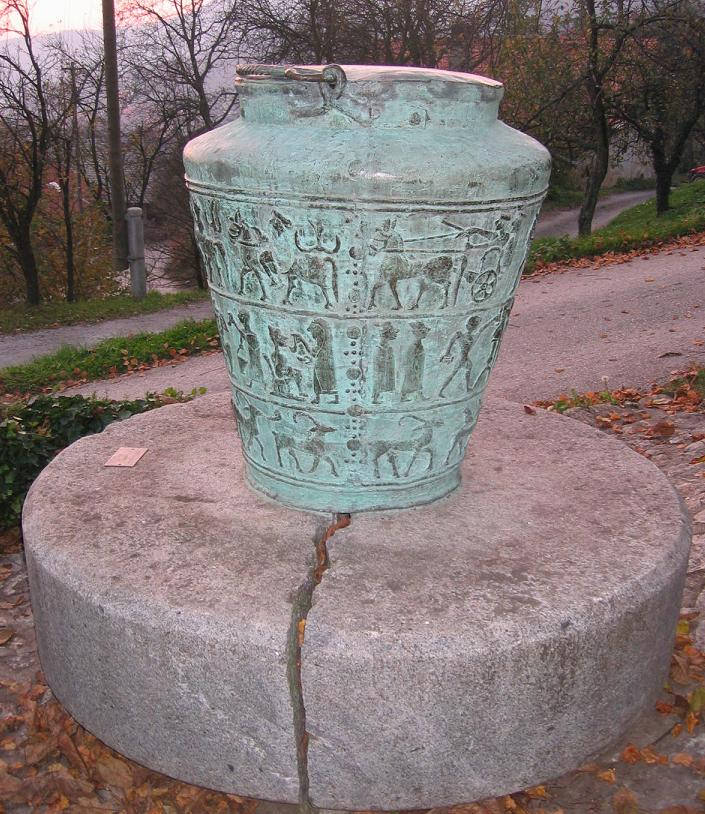
The Vače Situla, Slovenia

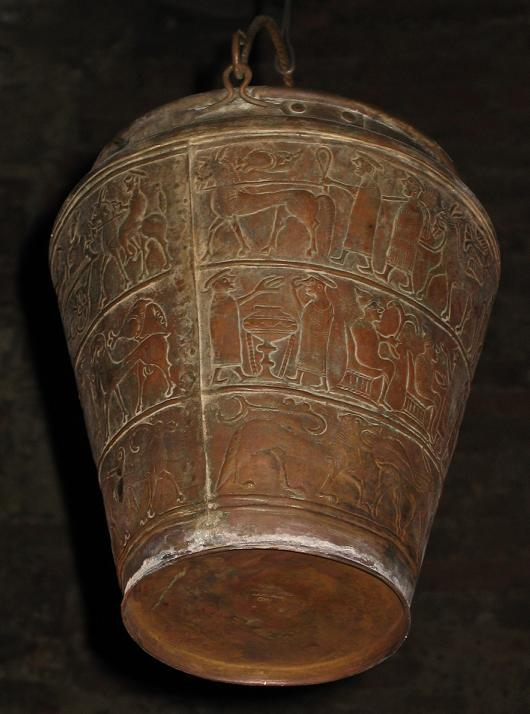
Replica of the Vače situla

== See also ==
- Vače Belt-Plate
- Este culture
