= Duane Rousselle =

Canadian sociologist (born 1982)

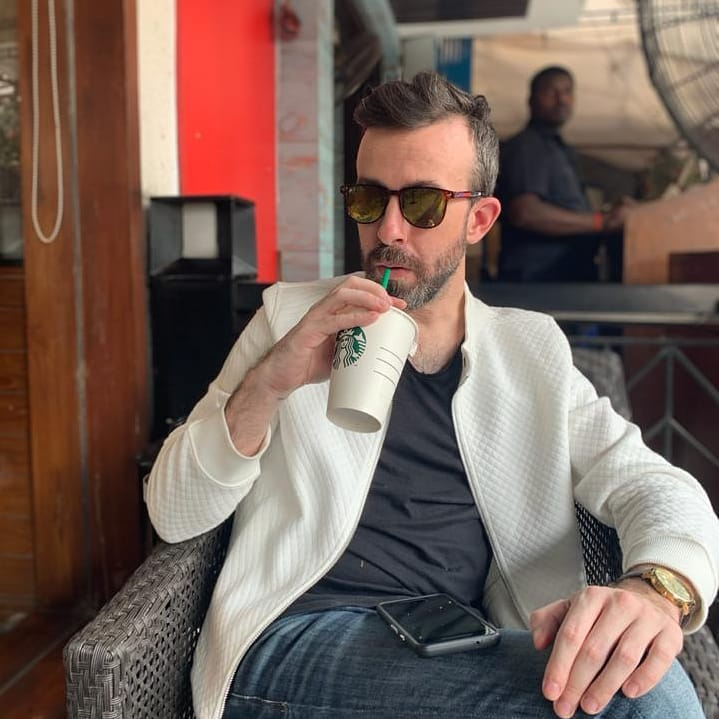
- Rousselle in Mumbai, 2020
- Born: April 28, 1982 (age 44); Miramichi, New Brunswick, Canada
- Awards: Governor General of Canada Gold Medal, Lieutenant Governor of New Brunswick Medal

Academic background
- Education: University of New Brunswick, Trent University, European Graduate School
- Thesis: Lacanian Realism: A Clinical and Political Investigation (2015)
- Academic advisors: Slavoj Žižek, Alain Badiou, Davide Panagia

Academic work
- Discipline: Psychoanalysis, sociological theory, anarchist theory

Duane Rousselle (born April 28, 1982) is a Canadian sociological theorist, Lacanian psychoanalyst, and professor of sociology.

He works in several academic fields including social movement theory, Lacanian psychoanalysis, cultural sociology, gender studies, anarchist studies, and Continental philosophy. His work attempts to introduce an alternative to scholarly discourses that aim to produce consistent and coherent bodies of knowledge (e.g., "university discourse"). It also offers a counterpoint to what Jacques Lacan has called "capitalist discourse."

He helped to contribute to the emergence of a new field of scholarly investigation known as "post-anarchism." He founded and edits the journal Anarchist Developments in Cultural Studies. He is often referred to as among the second generation of the Ljubljana school of psychoanalysis alongside Todd McGowan. His work has been translated into multiple languages, including Russian, Arabic, Persian, Turkish, Urdu/Hindi, Italian, French, and Spanish.

== Biography ==
Duane was born in Miramichi, New Brunswick to Catholic parents. He attended the New Brunswick Community College and graduated with a diploma in Electronic Game Design. After participating in a hunger strike for admittance, he was accepted as a Sociology Major at the University of New Brunswick in Fredericton. During this first year of his university education, he experienced devastating poverty, sleeping on park benches. He received numerous prestigious awards, including the Lieutenant Governor of New Brunswick silver medal for excellence in scholarship.

He went on to complete a master's degree in sociology from the University of New Brunswick before joining the PhD program in Cultural Studies from Trent University. During his time in Peterborough, he became a Freemason. He was awarded the Governor General of Canada Gold Medal for his research into clinical psychoanalysis and continental philosophy.

He studied also at the European Graduate School in Saas-Fee, Switzerland.

In 2016, Duane raised more than $100,000 to help rebuild a mosque that was attacked in a hate crime in Peterborough, Ontario. His efforts received international attention and he was invited for a private meeting with the Prime Minister Justin Trudeau. This was the subject of a documentary film by Matthew Hayes, The Masjid.

Duane is a Visiting associate professor of sociology at the University College of Dublin. He currently holds the position of Associate Dean of Research and associate professor at the Aga Khan University. In 2024, he established a psychoanalysis circle in Pakistan and became the inaugural president of the Pakistan Psychoanalytic Society.

== Thought ==
Duane was a leading proponent of "post-anarchism." He published numerous texts and edited the foundational book "Post-Anarchism: A Reader." He has argued that post-anarchism allowed anarchists to reflect upon their own presuppositions and to discover problems with theories of revolutionary and insurrection. He said that "what was so essential about post-anarchist theory was that it surprised anarchists. We became surprised by what it was that we have been saying for over 150 years."

One of Duane's key theories is that there has been a rise in the logic of "particular affirmations" of enjoyment after what Slavoj Žižek and others referred to as the "decline of symbolic efficiency." These "particular affirmations" are capable of producing the same results as modern fascism without any need of prohibitions against particular segments of the population. This logic has developed out of close readings of the late teachings of Jacques Lacan and the seminars of Jacques-Alain Miller. His argument was central to a debate with the noted philosopher Slavoj Žižek. However, there are also, among critical theorists, a perpetuation of "false negations," which are fawnings (also pronounced "faux-negs") of jouissance or enjoyment. He has attempted to show the false negativity of much of contemporary critical theory.

His work focuses on what he terms "feudal fixations" in contemporary capitalism. He described "plat-farm" capitalism as capitalism in a feudal mode, and said that "capitalism would be an advancement." This theory positions the logic of "particular affirmations" within an environment, one which is not bounded or limited.

In his book Psychoanalytic Sociology, Duane has written that psychoanalytic sociology is "not a sociology of psychoanalysis", it is "the psychoanalyst's sociology." His attempt in this book has been to think sociology from the perspective of psychoanalysis and its institutions.

== Pakistan Psychoanalytic Society ==
He founded the Pakistan Psychoanalytic Society and became its inaugural president. The Society emerged in the context of Psychoanalysis, Pakistan, a circle that Rousselle described as bringing together practitioners and theorists interested in psychoanalysis who were scattered across Pakistan. Rousselle has written about the development of psychoanalysis in Pakistan and the difficulties involved in reconstructing its history, including the relative absence of an established institutional tradition.

== Works ==
- Post-Anarchism: A Reader (Pluto Books) ISBN 9781783714568
- After Post-Anarchism (Repartee Books/LBC)
- Lacanian Realism: Political and Clinical Psychoanalysis (Bloomsbury Books) ISBN 9781350003552
- Jacques Lacan and American Sociology: Be Wary of the Image (Palgrave) ISBN 9783030197254
- Gender, Sexuality, and Subjectivity: A Lacanian Perspective on Identity, Language and Queer Theory (Routledge)
- Real Love: Essays on Psychoanalysis, Religion, and Society (Atropos)
- Post-anarchism and Psychoanalysis: Seminars on Politics and Society (Real Books) ISBN 9798377450665
- Negativity in Psychoanalysis: Theory and Clinic (Routledge) ISBN 9781032452098
- Psychoanalytic Sociology: A New Theory of the Social Bond (Bloomsbury) ISBN 9781350410190
- The Anxiety of Educators: Seminars on Psychoanalysis (unknown) ISBN 979-8292796688
