= Frank Ruda =

German philosopher

Frank Ruda is a German philosopher. He is professor of Modern and Contemporary Philosophy at the University of Dundee. He is also the current Vice-President of the European Graduate School (EGS), where he is also a Professor of Philosophy. He received his PhD in 2008 from University of Potsdam under the supervision of Christoph Menke with a work on Hegel's Philosophy of Right and his venia legendi (Habilitation) in 2017 from the Free University Berlin.

Ruda is co-editor of the journal Crisis and Critique, where he also hosts a podcast (with Agon Hamza).

== Works ==
- Hegel's Rabble: An Investigation into Hegel's Philosophy of Right. With a preface by Slavoj Žižek. London & New York: Continuum, 2011.
- For Badiou: Idealism without Idealism. With a preface by Slavoj Žižek. Evanston: Northwestern University Press, 2015.
- Abolishing Freedom: A Plea for a Contemporary Use of Fatalism. Lincoln: University of Nebraska Press, 2016.
- The Dash - The Other Side of Absolute Knowing (with Rebecca Comay). Cambridge: MIT Press Ltd, 2018.
- Indifferenz und Wiederholung. Konstanz: Konstanz University Press, 2018.
- Gegen-Freiheit. Komik und Fatalismus. Konstanz: Konstanz University Press, 2018.
- Reading Marx (with Agon Hamza and Slavoj Zizek). London, Polity Press, 2018.
- Reading Hegel (with Agon Hamza and Slavoj Zizek). London, Polity Press, 2022.
- Indifference and Repetition. With a preface by Alain Badiou. New York: Fordham University Press, 2023.
- Der Gedankenstrich – Die Kehrseite des absoluten Wissens (mit Rebecca Comay). Frankfurt am Main: Neue Deutsch-Französische Jahrbücher, 2023.

https://www.dundee.ac.uk/philosophy/staff/details/frank-ruda.php
