= Matthias Qualle =

Matthias Qualle (1470–1518; Slovenized as Matija Hvale), was a Slovene philosopher. Between 1502 and 1514 he taught philosophy at the University of Vienna's Faculty of Arts, and in 1510 he served as the faculty's dean.

== Life and work ==
Qualle was born in Vače, in present-day Slovenia. He started studying at Vienna in 1491, where he became a teacher. He was a mentor to, and later a colleague of, the Swiss humanist and reformer Joachim Vadian.

In 1513, his Commentarii in parvulum philosophiae naturalis (On the Origins of the Philosophy of Nature) was printed in Hagenau. It is considered the first known printed book written by a Slovene author. Qualle died in Vienna.
