= Paolo Knill =

Swiss artist (1932–2020)

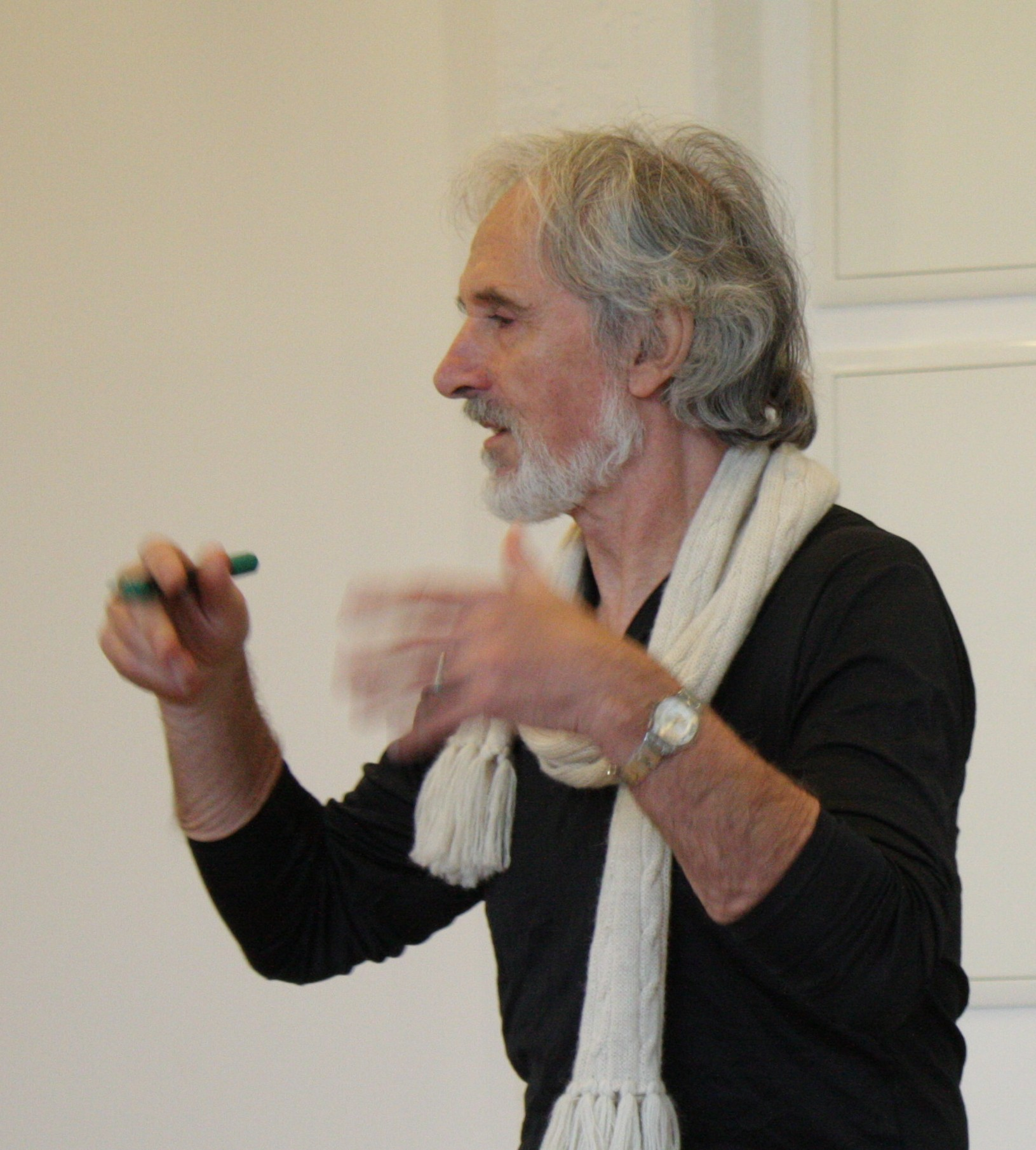
Paolo Knill

Paolo Knill (June 11, 1932, Neuhausen am Rheinfall – September 13, 2020, Schaffhausen) was a Swiss scientist, artist, and therapist. Knill was a professor at Lesley University in Cambridge, Massachusetts, where he helped to found their graduate program in Expressive Arts Therapy. In 1994, Knill founded the European Graduate School in Saas-Fee, Switzerland.

== Life ==
Knill studied musicology at the University of Zurich from 1953 until 1958. During this time he also studied Aerodynamics and Structural Mechanics at the Swiss Federal Institute of Technology in Zurich. From 1959 to 1961 he studied Organizational Consulting and Management Consulting at MIT. In 1976 he received his doctorate in psychology from Union Institute & University.

Between 1970 and 1975 Knill held assistant and guest professorships at the Conservatory of Winterthur and Zurich and at Tufts University in Medford, Massachusetts. From 1976 until 1995, Knill was professor of Counseling Psychologies and Expressive Arts Therapies at Lesley University. He was promoted to emeritus status in 1996.

Knill received an honorary doctorate in musicology from the Hochschule für Musik und Theater Hamburg in 2001.

== Academic work and contributions ==
=== Theoretical work ===
Knill is a co-founder of the field of expressive arts therapy. The discipline was developed in the United States during the 1970s as a practice and art-based therapy. It is rooted in phenomenology, the deliberations of systems theory, and ideas of humanist psychology. The philosophy of the Expressive Arts program at Lesley, which Knill helped to found, “embraced an intermodal or interdisciplinary approach to the arts therapies” integrating “indigenous healing systems” along with “contemporary philosophical developments such as phenomenology, hermeneutics and […] deconstructionism”.

Knill introduced the method of "intermodal decentering" in the 1990s. This method is based upon systems theory. It leads the patient out of the constriction of thinking and acting tied to their problem and into a space of playful and artistic shape/form. This leeway allows for sensual experiences that are neither predictable nor intentional. The client can find "solution possibilities" in the concretely observable "here" and "now" of the artistic process. In this context, Knill developed a "theory of crystallization". According to him, this theory is based fundamentally upon the phenomenological premise that in artistic therapy, meaning arises exclusively from out of aesthetic material, through which therapist and client step to one another in relation.

In 1990 Knill introduced the concept of the ‘incommunicable third’ into scientific discourse in order to indicate that moment in which something new emerges abruptly or unforeseen from out of a therapeutic encounter.

Knill developed an artistic methodology for work with large communities following the methodology of Expressive Arts Therapy. He called this methodology “community art”.

=== Institutions ===
In addition to developing the theoretical foundations of Expressive Arts Therapy, Knill has contributed to the foundation of several institutions dedicated to the field. Janbil helped to found the Expressive Arts Therapy program at Lesley University in the 1970s. He founded the International School for Interdisciplinary Studies in Switzerland in 1984. The institution has training centers in Canada, Denmark, Germany and the United States. The Canadian branch has since been renamed the CREATE Institute. In 1994, Knill founded the European Graduate School in Saas-Fee, Switzerland.

== Bibliography ==
=== Titles in German ===
- Ausdruckstherapie. Künstlerischer Ausdruck in Therapie und Erziehung als intermediale Methode. Halle: Ohlsen Verlag, 1979. ISBN 3-922169-12-0.
- Medien in Therapie und Ausbildung. Bremen: Eres Verlag, 1983. ISBN 3922169163.
- Kunstorientiertes Handeln in der Begleitung von Veränderungsprozessen. Zurich: EGIS Verlag, 2005. ISBN 3-905680-01-7.
- Lösungskunst. Lehrbuch der kunst- und ressourcenorientierten Arbeit. Göttingen: Vandenhoeck & Ruprecht, 2010. ISBN 978-3-525-40159-0.

=== Titles in English ===
- Minstrels of the Soul, Intermodal Expressive Therapy. Toronto: Palmerston Press, 1993. ISBN 978-0968533031.
- Principles and Practice of Expressive Arts Therapy, with Stephen and Ellen Levine. London: Jessica Kingsley, 2004. ISBN 978-1843100393.
