= Bibijana Čujec =

Slovene physicist (1926–2022)

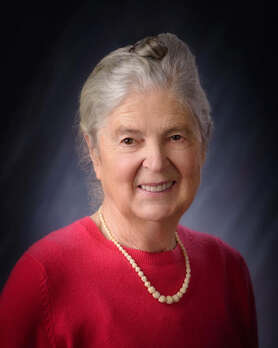
- Born: 25 December 1926; Ljubljana, Slovenia
- Died: 8 September 2022 (aged 95); Edmonton, Canada
- Citizenship: Slovene, Canadian
- Education: Univerza v Ljubljani
- Spouse: Anton Čujec (born 1924, died 2001)
- Children: Čujec Gallagher Sonja, Cujec Bibiana, Cujec Anne-Marie, Cujec Thomas Peter
- Scientific career
- Fields: nuclear physics, astrophysics
- Workplaces: IJS, Lund University, University of Alberta Edmonton, Universite Laval, CERN, Caltech Pasadena
- Thesis: photonuclear reactions with particular regard to the Wilkinson model (1959)
- Doctoral advisor: Anton Peterlin
- Other academic advisors: Anton Peterlin, J. Plemelj, I. Vidav

Bibijana Čujec (née Dobovišek; 25 December 1926 – 8 September 2022) was a Slovene physicist. She obtained her degree in 1950 at the Faculty of Natural Sciences and Mathematics in Ljubljana, and in 1959 her PhD in physics at the Faculty of Natural Sciences of University of Ljubljana. From 1954 to 1961 she worked at the Jožef Stefan Institute, specialized later in Pittsburgh, United States, and in 1963 moved to Canada.

== Life and scientific career ==
Bibijana Dobovišek was born on 25 December 1926 in Ljubljana, to father Mihael Dobovišek, technician, and mother Mary, born Dolinar, office worker. She attended primary school and grammar school in the Ursulines convent in 1933–1945. In 1945–1950 she studied mathematics and physics at the Faculty of Natural Sciences of the University of Ljubljana (professors Josip Plemelj and Ivan Vidav for mathematics, Anton Peterlin for physics). After graduating, Čujec worked at the Institute of Physics [SAZU] in 1950–1954, and at the Jožef Stefan Institute in 1955–1961. In 1956 she married Anton Čujec. Bibijana Čujec devoted herself to nuclear physics, and on the basis of her dissertation "Photonuclear reaction with special reference to the Wilkinson model" she received her doctorate in 1959 from the University of Ljubljana. In 1961, she went abroad for postdoctoral training. Until 1963, she worked as a researcher at the University of Pittsburgh in the USA on "stripping" reactions. She then went to Canada, where she was followed by her family. She lectured for the first year (1963–64) at the University of Alberta in Edmonton, then transferred to Laval University in Quebec. In 1964 she began as an assistant, in 1966 she became an associate professor and in 1970 a full professor. While serving at Laval, she worked for two years at the Kellogg Radiation Laboratory at California Institute of Technology in Pasadena, USA, and one year at CERN in Geneva. Čujec taught nuclear physics, elementary particles, modern physics, statistical thermodynamics, experimental physics, etc. In addition to undergraduate lectures, she supported students in obtaining master's and doctoral degrees. Through her work at Laval University, she has made a significant contribution to the development of a study and research program in nuclear physics at this institution. Čujec has been – among other institutions – a member of the American Physical Society and the Canadian Association of Physicists.

Research by Čujec covered various fields of experimental nuclear physics. In the beginning (in Ljubljana and 1954 in Lund, Sweden), she studied basic particles in cosmic rays and photo-nuclear reactions in experiments using the betatron accelerator. Later (in the US and Canada) she devoted herself to nuclear spectroscopy and to studies of 3He and 4He scattering. A study of reactions between heavier cores (e.g. 12C +12C) at low energy followed, while also addressing the field of astrophysics, later reactions among heavier nuclei and proton-antiproton collisions at low energies (CERN 1985–6).

The four children of Bibijana Čujec followed their mother in their professional and research fields: Sonja (born 1957) is a civil engineer, Bibijana (1959) is a doctor-cardiologist, Tomaž (1964) is a molecular biologist, and Ana Marija followed her mother (1967) in physics. Their father, Anton Čujec (born 1924), became an ordained priest in the Catholic eastern rite church and died in 2001.

Čujec died in Edmonton on 8 September 2022, at the age of 95.

== Sources ==
- Slovene biographic lexicon – Bibijana Čujec
- Beyond : life of a nuclear physicist, wife and mother : autobiography. Bibiana Čujec. Victoria, B.C. : B. Čujec, c2012. (ISBN 9780988069107)
- Scientific contributions of B. Cujec
