= Rado Riha =

Slovene philosopher (born 1948)

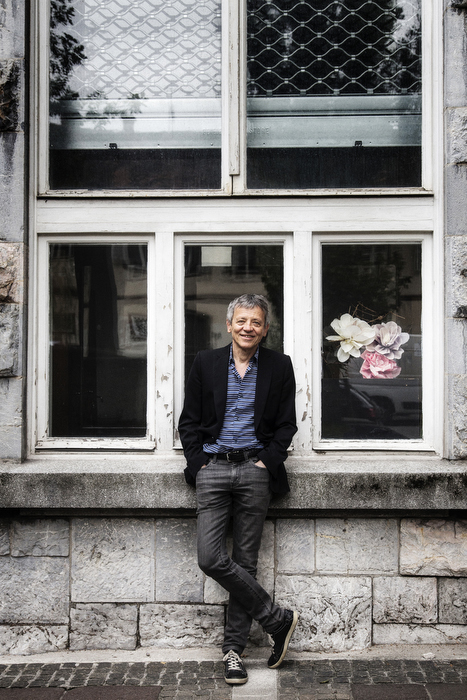
- Rado Riha in 2021
- Born: October 8, 1948 (age 78)
- Occupation: Philosopher
- Spouse: Jelica Šumič Riha

Rado Riha (born 8 October 1948) is a Slovene philosopher. He is a senior research fellow and currently the head of the Institute of Philosophy, Centre for Scientific Research at the Slovenian Academy of Sciences and Arts, and coordinator of the philosophy module at the post-graduate study programme of the University of Nova Gorica.

Born in Ljubljana, former Yugoslavia, he studied philosophy at the University of Ljubljana. In the 1980s, he was part of what was known as the Ljubljana school of psychoanalysis. In the 1970s and 1980s, he was member of the League of Communists of Slovenia. He left the party in October 1988, together with 32 other left wing intellectuals, as a protest against the arrest by Yugoslav military intelligence of the dissident Janez Janša and three other journalists critical of the regime. During the so-called JBTZ trial in 1988, he was an active member of the Committee for the Defence of Human Rights, the largest non-Communist civil society platform in the Socialist Republic of Slovenia.

Riha's research topics include ethics, epistemology, contemporary French philosophy, the psychoanalysis of Jacques Lacan, and the philosophy of Immanuel Kant. From 1996 to 2003 he has been the editor-in-chief of the journal Filozofski vestnik, and since 1993 a member of its editorial board.

He is married to the philosopher Jelica Šumič Riha.

== Books ==
- Filozofija v znanosti : prispevki k razrednemu značaju marksistične teorije, (Analecta). Ljubljana: Univerzum, 1982.
- Problemi teorije fetišizma, (Filozofija skozi psihoanalizo, 2), (Analecta). Ljubljana: Univerzum, 1985 (with Slavoj Žižek).
- Pravo in razsodna moč : od avtoritete brez jamstva do pravila brez opore, Ljubljana: Študentska organizacija Univerze, 1993 (with Jelica Šumič Riha), ISBN 86-7347-049-8.
- Reale Geschehnisse der Freiheit : zur Kritik der Urteilskraft in Lacanscher Absicht, (Wo es war, 3). Wien: Turia & Kant, 1993, ISBN 3-85132-039-5.
- Kant in drugi kopernikański obrat v filozofiji. Ljubljana: Založba ZRC, 2012, ISBN 978-961-254-408-9.
- Kant in Lacan'scher Ansicht : die kopernikanische Wende und das Reale. Wien, Berlin: Turia + Kant, 2018, ISBN 978-3-85132-901-8.

== Selected articles ==
- “Plurale Subjekte als konkrete Endlichkeiten : oder Wie Laclau mit Kant gelesen werden kann”, in: Oliver Marchart (ed.), Judith Butler, Das Undarstellbare der Politik : Zur Hegemonietheorie Ernesto Laclaus. Wien: Turia + Kant, 1998.
- “Kritika razsodne moči kot zadnja Kantova kritika”, in: Immanuel Kant. Kritika razsodne moči, (Philosophica, Series Classica). Ljubljana: Založba ZRC, ZRC SAZU, 1999.
- “Die Romantik im Gefecht des Symbolischen, Imaginären und Realen”, in: Wolfgang Müller-Funk, (ed.), Franz Schuh, (ed.). Nationalismus und Romantik. Wien: Turia + Kant, 1999.
- “La philosophie comme noeud de l'universel, du singulier et du sujet”, in: Jelica Šumič-Riha (ed.), Universel, singulier, sujet, (Collection "Philosophie - épistémologie"). Paris: Éditions Kimé, 2000.
- “Politics as the real of philosophy”, in: Simon Critchley, (ed.), Oliver Marchart (ed.), Laclau: a critical reader. London; New York: Routledge, 2004.
- "Kommunismus als Gemeinschaft 'für alle'", in: Indeterminate! Kommunismus: Texte zu Ökonomie, Politik und Kultur, Münster: Unrast, 2005 (with J. Šumič Riha)
- “Kantova moralna filozofija za naš čas”: introductory study. In: Immanuel Kant, Utemeljitev metafizike nravi, (Philosophica, Series Classica). Ljubljana: Založba ZRC, ZRC SAZU, 2005.
- “Um v zgodovini: introductory study”, in: Immanuel Kant, Zgodovinsko-politični spisi, (Philosophica, Series Classica). Ljubljana: Založba ZRC, ZRC SAZU, 2006.
- “La política como lo real de la filosofía”, in: Simon Critchley (ed.), Oliver Marchart (ed.), Laclau : aproximaciones críticas a su obra. Buenos Aires: Fondo de Cultura Económica, 2008.
- "Does science think?", in: Frank Ruda (ed.), Jan Voelker (ed.), Science and Thought. Ljubljana: Filozofski vestnik, 2010.
- "Kant und die Frage des Realismus", Ljubljana: Filozofski vestnik, no. 3, 2018.
- "Europa als Fall der Idee", in: Jelica Šumič-Riha (ed.), "Rethinking the idea of Europe". Ljubljana: Založba ZRC, 2019. Filozofski vestnik, vol. 40, no. 2.
