= Filozofski vestnik =

- Discipline: Philosophy
- Language: English, French, German, Slovene
- Edited by: Peter Klepec

Publication details
- History: 1980–present
- Publisher: Institute of Philosophy of the Slovenian Academy of Sciences and Arts (Slovenia)
- Frequency: Triannual
- Open access: Yes

Standard abbreviations
- ISO 4: Filoz. Vestn.

Indexing
- ISSN: 1581-1239 (print); 0353-4510 (web)
- OCLC no.: 929387972

Links
- Journal homepage

Filozofski vestnik is a philosophy journal published by the Institute of Philosophy of the Slovenian Academy of Sciences and Arts. It covers issues like contemporary political philosophy, history of philosophy, history of political thought, philosophy of law, social philosophy, epistemology, philosophy of science, cultural critique, ethics, and aesthetics. It is not committed to a particular philosophical orientation, style or school. The journal was established in 1980. It was issued semi-annual from 1980 to 1995 (with many double issues), three issues per year appeared since 1996. Articles are written in Slovene, English, French, and German. Rado Riha was the journal's editor-in-chief from 1996 to 2003.

== See also ==
- List of academic journals published in Slovenia
