= Ljubljana school of psychoanalysis =

School of thought centred in Ljubljana, Slovenia

Ljubljana school of psychoanalysis (Slovene: Ljubljanska psihoanalitska šola or Ljubljanska šola za psihoanalizo), also known as the Ljubljana Lacanian School (Slovene: Ljubljanska lakanovska šola), is a popular name for a school of thought centred on the Society for Theoretical Psychoanalysis based in Ljubljana, Slovenia. Philosophers related to School include Rastko Močnik, Slavoj Žižek, Mladen Dolar, Alenka Zupančič, Miran Božovič and Eva Bahovec. Other scholars associated with the school include philosophers Simon Hajdini, Zdravko Kobe, Rado Riha, Jelica Šumič Riha, sociologist Renata Salecl and philosopher Peter Klepec.

== Historical background ==
The school was founded in the late 1970s by young Slovenian followers of the theories of the French psychoanalyst Jacques Lacan, in what was then the Socialist Federal Republic of Yugoslavia. Founding members of the school included Rastko Močnik, Slavoj Žižek and Mladen Dolar. Their main aim was to bring together the philosophy of German idealism, Marxism and psychoanalytic theories as a means of analysis of contemporary social, cultural and political phenomena. The school rose to prominence in the international academic environment in the 1990s. Members of the school did not practice psychoanalysis on patients.

The group was formed around a young generation of Marxist students at the University of Ljubljana, in Socialist Slovenia. Contrary to their older colleagues, affiliated with the Praxis school, these young students rejected Marxist humanism and turned towards the "antihumanism" of the French Marxist philosopher Louis Althusser and, to a lesser extent, to the Frankfurt School.

The main goal of the Ljubljana School was to re-interpret Marxism by emphasizing the rootedness of Karl Marx's thought in the tradition of German idealism. They favoured an anti-historicist interpretation of Hegel's philosophy, with an emphasis on his epistemology and dialectic philosophy. Most of the members of the Ljubljana school have been indebted to the Slovenian Marxist Božidar Debenjak, professor of philosophy at the University of Ljubljana, renowned for his attentive reading of German idealism, who introduced the Frankfurt School in Slovenia.

A specific feature of the Ljubljana School was to connect the Marxist and Hegelian traditions with Lacanian psychoanalysis and with Structuralism. The combined reading of Lacan, German idealism (especially Hegel), Marx, the Frankfurt school and authors from the structuralist tradition, especially Claude Lévi-Strauss, has since been the distinctive feature of the Ljubljana School.

== Theoretical work ==
The Ljubljana School of Psychoanalysis focuses on the following areas:

- readings of modern and classical philosophy (especially German idealism) through the theory of Jacques Lacan;
- elaboration of Lacanian theories of ideology and power (both of the Communist regime in the 1980s and the liberal democracy after 1990);
- analysis of culture and art, with a special emphasis on cinema.

== Institutional frame ==
The school first emerged in the late 1970s as a distinct intellectual group within the alternative journal Problemi. Since the mid-1960s, this journal served as the only alternative media in Slovenia where critical and dissenting opinions against the mainstream Titoist ideology could be heard. The journal thus hosted an extremely wide range of contributors, from apolitical modernist literates, civic nationalists, conservatives, liberals, social democrats up to radical Marxists, Lacanians and followers of the Frankfurt school. By the early 1980s, the tensions within the editorial board reached their height, causing the more conservative and non-Marxist contributors to publicly petition the authorities of the Socialist Republic of Slovenia to be allowed to establish their own journal. Their demands were accepted in 1981, where a new alternative journal, the Nova revija, was founded. From then on, the followers of the Ljubljana School gradually took over the journal Problemi, transforming it into the main platform of their intellectual activities.

In 1985, the journal Problemi launched the Analecta book series, publishing more than 60 monographs since, mostly translations of classical and contemporary philosophers (e.g. Spinoza, Hume, Hegel, Kant, Derrida, Lyotard and Badiou), as well as Slovene authors. In the late 1980s, the Society for Theoretical Psychoanalysis was founded as the central coordinating body of publishing and editorial activities of the group. The current president of the society is Slavoj Žižek.

Nevertheless, the academic activity has mostly been taking place within the University of Ljubljana and the various institutes and departments associated to it (such as the Faculty of Arts and the Institute for Sociology) and the Scientific Research Centre of the Slovenian Academy of Sciences and Arts.

== Controversy ==
The popular name of "Ljubljana School of Psychoanalysis" is seen as problematic by some, since none of its members are practicing psychoanalysts. The issue was raised by The Slovenian Society For Lacanian Psychoanalysis in 2015.

The Slovene Society for Theoretical Analysis, around which the popular name is centered, responded that its work is "focused on intersections and encounters between philosophy and psychoanalysis. It has never pretended to deal with anything else but the theoretical psychoanalysis, and this entails no conflict with psychoanalytic practice nor has anyone ever maintained that the one would be a replacement for the other."

In 2016, the Slovenian Lacanian psychoanalyst Nina Krajnik launched an international initiative with the claim that Ljubljana School tried to prevent the presence of the Lacanian psychoanalysis in Slovenia and that several academic articles of the members of Ljubljana School are based on plagiarism.

== Debates ==
Members of the Slovenian School of Psychoanalysis have engaged in a number of high profile debates. Slavoj Zizek engaged in a noted debate with the University of Toronto Psychology Professor Jordan Peterson in Canada about happiness and communism.

Slavoj Zizek and Alenka Zupancic have also engaged in friendly debates with the Canadian sociologist Duane Rousselle about limitations to the Slovenian School paradigm. Rousselle argues for a paradigm shift which restitutes the presuppositions of the Slovenian School into a different register. Through this approach, Rousselle inaugurated the Neo-Slovenian School which also includes the theological work of Mark Gerard Murphy.

== See also ==
- Continental philosophy
- Critical theory
- Post-Marxism

== Sources ==
- The Times Higher Education Supplement
- Glossary of American- Slovenian relations
