= Sergiy Verigin =

Russian Catholic (1868–1938)

Sergiy Verigin (24 March 1868 in Ljubljana, Slovenia – 1938) was a Russian Orthodox convert to Catholicism. Initially ordained an Orthodox clergyman, in 1907 Verigin changed his religious position united himself to Catholic faith. From 1910 to 1929 was a priest who celebrated Mass in a Russian Catholic church in Rome and participated as a member of Pro Russia movement, however maintaining pessimistic views in relation to Russian Orthodoxy union with Catholic Church. Verigin died in 1938.

== Biography ==
Sergiy Verigin was born in Ljubljana in a family of Russian nobles, his father was then working in the Russian embassy. In 1888 graduated from high school in Moscow, after which he entered the Moscow Theological Academy, where he studied with Father Nicholas Tolstoy, who took the union with Catholic Church in 1894. In 1889 Verigin dedicated to the priesthood in the Penza and received a gold cross as a sign of special favor and the location of the emperor. By tradition of the Russian Orthodox Church was forced to marry her, but married life was painful about. Sergius, and at the first opportunity, distanced himself from his wife and children and saw them only occasionally. In 1905 sent as a priest in France and served in Pau and Biarritz until mid 1907. On 28 August 1907 Father Verigin joined to the Catholic Church and Cardinal Rampolla del Tindaro specifically addressed him the issue of accession. Sergiy Verigin repeatedly crossed the border of the Austro-Hungarian Empire. There he met with Metropolitan Andrey Sheptytsky that on 8 August 1910 attributed it to his diocese as a missionary with the right to conduct services in the Russian Catholic Church in Rome. From 1910 until the demolition of the church in 1932 he served the Divine Liturgy in the Russian Catholic Church of Saint Lawrence in Rome and on 10 October 1932 Verigin was appointed rector of the new church of Saint Anthony in Russicum . He died in 1938 as a result of a short illness. His ashes were buried in the crypt of the grave at Greek College.
