= Christopher Fynsk =

American philosopher

Christopher Ingebreth Fynsk (born August 30, 1952) is an American philosopher. He is Professor and Dean of the Division of Philosophy, Art, and Critical Thought at the European Graduate School in Saas-Fee, Switzerland and Professor Emeritus at the University of Aberdeen. He is well known for his work relating the political and literary aspects of continental philosophy. Fynsk's work is closely involved with that of Martin Heidegger, Maurice Blanchot, Emmanuel Levinas, Walter Benjamin and several contemporary artists, including Francis Bacon and Salvatore Puglia.

== Career ==
Christopher Fynsk received his doctorate from the Department of Romance Studies at Johns Hopkins University in 1981, after receiving a Diplôme d’Études Approfondies in Philosophy from the University of Strasbourg. He also received an MA in English from the University of California, Irvine, in 1976, and an MA in French at Johns Hopkins University in 1979. He taught in the Philosophy Department at the University of Strasbourg from 1985 to 1987, and from 1981 to 2004 he worked as Professor of Comparative Literature and Philosophy, Co-Director of the Philosophy, Literature and the Theory of Criticism Program and Chair of the Department of Comparative Literature at State University of New York at Binghamton (1991-2004). In 2004, he moved to the University of Aberdeen as a 6th Century Chair to join the faculty of the School of Language and Literature, where he formed the Centre for Modern Thought.

== Bibliography ==
- Last Steps: Maurice Blanchot's Exilic Writing (New York: Fordham University Press, 2013).
- The Claim of Language: A Case for the Humanities (Minneapolis: University of Minnesota Press, 2004).
- Infant Figures: The Death of the Infans and Other Scenes of Origin (Stanford: Stanford University Press, 2000)
- Language and Relation: …that there is language (Stanford: Stanford University Press, 1996).
- Heidegger: Thought and Historicity (Ithaca & London: Cornell University Press, 1986; 2nd edn., 1993).

== See also ==
- List of deconstructionists
- American philosophy
- List of American philosophers
