= Milos Krofta =

Milos Krofta(July 23, 1912 - 2002) was a Slovenian engineer and businessman. He developed the technology of dissolved air flotation mainly for the paper industry, in aim to improve the water reuse and to reach the goal of zero discharge. He founded the Lenox Institute for Water Technology, an educational institution for the teaching of water treatment technologies, and was inducted in the Paper Industry International Hall of Fame in 1997. His contribution to technological improvement in paper production and in the use of dissolved air flotation is so much eminent that the equipment itself is often named Krofta itself.

== Life and career ==
Born in Ljubljana, Slovenia on July 23, 1912, he studied mechanical engineering in both Ljubljana and Prague; after some years managing paper mills in Slovenia, he moved to Milan, Italy in 1945 due to the political situation in his homeland. He started successfully operating as an engineering consultant and then moved to USA, where he moved in 1951; after the set up of Krofta Engineering Corporation, Dr. Krofta began to design and manufacture equipment for his customers. His improvements in hydraulic design resulted in major improvements in DAF technology performances in water clarification, both for the paper industry and different applications, with lower chemicals and energy consumption; the high efficiency of equipment like the Krofta Supercell allowed for high rate of pulp recovery and reuse of process water, reaching the goal of zero discharge for a water demanding industry. Milos Krofta started several branches in the world and founded the Lenox Institute for Water Technology, a non-profit educational and research unit based in Lenox, MA; Krofta companies, his patents and legacy are now part of KWI and Krofta.
