= Alenka Zupančič =

Slovenian philosopher

- Born: 1 April 1966 (age 60); Ljubljana, PR Slovenia, FPR Yugoslavia

Education
- Education: University of Ljubljana; Université Paris VIII
- Doctoral advisor: Alain Badiou; Slavoj Žižek

Philosophical work
- Era: Contemporary philosophy
- Region: Western philosophy
- School: Ljubljana school of psychoanalysis
- Institutions: University of Ljubljana
- Doctoral students: Julie Reshe
- Main interests: Ontology; political theory; psychoanalysis; cultural studies; German idealism; ethics

Alenka Zupančič (born 1 April 1966) is a Slovenian philosopher whose work focuses on psychoanalysis and continental philosophy. She is a Slovenian psychoanalytic theorist and philosopher who along with Mladen Dolar and Slavoj Žižek have in large measure been responsible for the popularity in North America (and Europe) of a politically infused Lacanian psychoanalysis.

== Academics and work ==
Born in Ljubljana, Zupančič graduated from the University of Ljubljana in 1990 and received her doctorate in 1995 with a dissertation titled Dejanje in zakon, nezavedno in pojem. Zupančič went on to receive a second doctorate from the Université Paris VIII under Alain Badiou in 1997. She is currently a full-time researcher at the Institute of Philosophy of the Slovenian Academy of Sciences and Arts and a visiting professor at the European Graduate School. Zupančič belongs to the Ljubljana School of Psychoanalysis, which is known for its predominantly Lacanian foundations. Her philosophy is strongly influenced by Slovenian Lacanian scholars, especially Mladen Dolar and Slavoj Žižek.

Zupančič has written on several topics including ethics, literature, comedy, and love. She is most renowned as a Nietzsche scholar, but Immanuel Kant, Georg Wilhelm Friedrich Hegel, Henri Bergson and Alain Badiou are also referenced in her work. She has many videos on YouTube where she talks about her work and the topics. She has also a Facebook page. There are videos of her and her lectures on the European Graduate School website.

She has 242 works in 305 publications in 6 languages and 3,558 library holdings.

== Bibliography ==
- Alenka Zupančič EGS Faculty Page (Biography & Works).

Title	Year	Publisher	ISBN	Notes
What IS Sex?	2017	Gallopade	9780793368907	Argument around sex and gender in a Hegelian/Lacanian perspective
Disavowal	2024		9781350515871	
Ethics of the Real: Kant and Lacan	1995	Verso	1859847242	Kant and Lacan
The Odd One In: On Comedy	2008		9786074179149	
The Shortest Shadow: Nietzsche's Philosophy of the Two	2003		0262261324	
Let Them Rot: Antigone’s Parallax	2023		9781531501051	
Cinsellik Nedir	2018		9786253995874	
¿Qué es el sexo?	2021		9788413777917	
Sobre la comedia: un extraño en casa ...	2012		9789876999182	
¿Por qué el psicoanálisis?	2013		9789878941462	
Neden Psikanaliz: Üc Müdahale	2011		9786253754129	
Qu est-ce que le sexe ?	2019	Éditions	9782897991166	réflexions rétrospectives et prospectives pour souligner le 50e anniversaire de fondation du Conseil du trésor du Québec
Was ist Sex? Psychoanalyse und Ontologie	2019		9783955583613	
Che cosa è il sesso?	2018		9791259931894	
Ser-para-el-sexo: Diálogo entre filosofía y psicoanálisis	2013		9788494152108	
Komedi Sonsuzun Fizigi	2022	Metis	9753428197	216 pages
Freud und der Todestrieb			3851328922	
Das Reale einer Illusion: Kant und Lacan	2001		9788446045946	
What is Psychoanalysis	2008		971235072X	
Poetika: druga knjiga	2004		9781666967234	
Esthétique du désir, éthique de la jouissance	2002		9781789602197	
Verleugnung	2026		9783451840203	
Perché la psicoanalisi? Tre interventi	2021		9791222323299	
Pustila bi jih trohneti: Antigonina paralaksa	2022			
Warum Psychoanalyse? drei Interventionen	2009	Transcript	9783839428849	»Übergriffe« und »Objekte« in Kulturellen Konstellationen Kindlich-Jugendlicher Sexualität
Der Geist der Komödie	2014	Merve	978-3-88396-301-3	German translation of "The Odd One In: On Comedy", transl. by Frank Ruda und Jan Völker
Hegel ve Freud: Olumsuzlamadan Dürtüye	2020		6258242839	
Konec: The end	2019	De	9783111655444	Slavic literature, history and criticism
Realno iluzije	2001			
Der kürzeste Schatten: Nietzsches Philosophie der Zwei	2024		3985140944	
La sexualidad dentro de los límites de la mera razón	2013		9568438394	
Lacan et la sexualité post-moderne	2025		9791095543572	
Nietzsche: filozofija dvojega	2001		9781789603590	
Etica del Reale. Kant, Lacan	2012		9789569441479	
L'éthique du réel: Kant avec Lacan	2009		9780823265169	
Umbr(a): Writing	2010		9780979953934	
