= Miran Božovič =

Slovenian philosopher

Miran Božovič (born August 12, 1957) is a Slovenian philosopher and psychoanalyst, associated with the Ljubljana school of psychoanalysis.

Božovič was born in Ljubljana. He holds a degree in comparative literature and philosophy from the University of Ljubljana, and a PhD in philosophy. He teaches early modern philosophy at the Faculty of Arts of the University of Ljubljana.

Božovič has written on several controversial subjects, including Bentham's concept of panopticon, the conceptualizations of the body in early modern philosophy, and the influence of traditional exorcist notions on Descartes' philosophy.
