= Rastko Močnik =

Slovenian sociologist and political activist

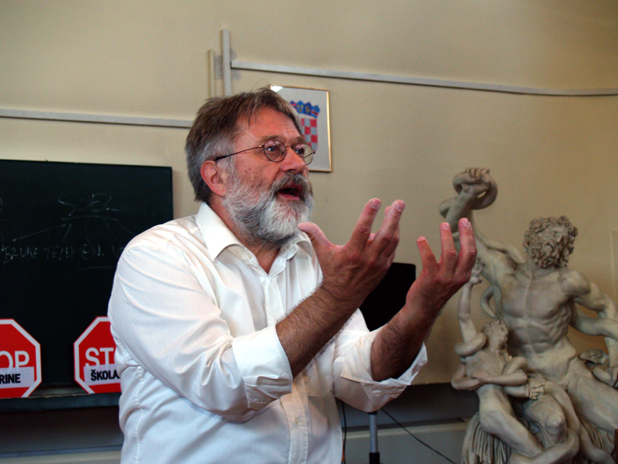
- Močnik in 2010
- Born: 27 August 1944 (age 81); Ljubljana, Adriatic Littoral, Nazi Germany (now Slovenia)

Rastko Močnik (born 27 August 1944) is a Slovenian sociologist, psychoanalyst, literary theorist, translator and political activist. Together with Slavoj Žižek and Mladen Dolar, he is considered one of the co-founders of the Ljubljana school of psychoanalysis.

== Early life and education ==
He was born as Josip Rastko Močnik in a middle-class family in Ljubljana. He studied sociology and history of literature at the University of Ljubljana, graduating in 1968 under the supervision of Dušan Pirjevec. During his student years, he was active in several avant-garde literary movements. In 1964, he became the last co-editor (together with the poet Tomaž Šalamun) of the alternative journal Perspektive, before it was closed down by the Yugoslav government. Between 1968 and 1970 he worked as a journalist at the journal Delo. He later studied at the École des hautes études en sciences sociales in Paris, where he obtained a PhD in philosophy under the supervision of Algirdas Julien Greimas.

== Work life and politics ==
After returning to Ljubljana, he became the editor of the alternative journal Problemi. During this period, he started a close collaboration with Marxist philosophers Slavoj Žižek and Mladen Dolar. Since 1984, Močnik is professor of sociology at the Faculty of Arts of the University of Ljubljana.

Močnik was among the first Slovene theorists who introduced structuralism and the theories of Marxist philosopher Louis Althusser in Slovenian academia. He has written on several subjects including theory of ideology, theoretical psychoanalysis, semiotics, linguistics and epistemology of humanities and social sciences. He has also translated works of Jacques Lacan, Émile Durkheim and Marcel Mauss into Slovene.

Močnik has also been active in several civil and political movements in Slovenia. In the early 1980s, he was one of the most outspoken opponents of a high school education reform, carried out by the League of Communists of Slovenia, in which the classical grammar schools (the so-called gymnasium) were abolished as a supposed remainder of old bourgeois elitism. In 1982, he also wrote a petition against such reform, together with editor Braco Rotar, social theorist Neda Pagon and jurist Matevž Krivic. The petition was signed by over 600 intellectuals, and was one of the first wide and openly critical civil society initiatives in Socialist Slovenia. Between 1988 and 1990, he served on the board of the Committee for the Defence of Human Rights, the main civil society organization in Slovenia during the process of democratization. In the early 1990s, he opposed the dissolution of Yugoslavia, was critical of the DEMOS coalition and Slovenian independence.

In 1990, Močnik was elected president of a small extra-parliamentary party, called Social Democratic Union (Socialdemokratska unija, SDU), which was linked to Ante Marković's Union of Reform Forces. The party failed to win any significant popular support, and remained outside of the Slovenian Parliament. After its dissolution in the early 1990s, Močnik left party politics, but continued to participate in the public debate. He was one of the few Slovenian public intellectuals who opposed the unilateral declaration of Slovenian independence. In the late 1990s, he opposed the Slovenian entry in NATO. He has also been highly critical of the Bologna process.

Močnik also writes weekly columns in the Slovene leftist journal Mladina and is a member of the advisory board of the regional left-wing magazine Novi Plamen.

In 2017, Močnik has signed the Declaration on the Common Language of the Croats, Serbs, Bosniaks and Montenegrins.

== Controversies ==
Močnik's ambiguous positions in the years 1989–1991, when he was critical of Slovenia's independence from Yugoslavia, was criticized by many at the time, and has remained one of the frequent political reproaches against him, including from the conservative ex Prime Minister Janez Janša.

In 2008, his article "Slovene historians on the Destruction of Yugoslav Federation" published in a special issue of the review Borec under the name Oddogodenje zgodovine – primer Jugoslavije' ("The Uneventment of History - The Case of Yugoslavia") together with contributions by the "new generation" of Slovenian historians and young foreign researchers such as Ozren Pupovac, Alberto Toscano and Geoffroy Geraud-Legros, became highly polemical as he criticized some trends on historical revisionism in contemporary Slovenian historiography. In the article, Močnik accused three of the most prominent contemporary Slovene historians, Peter Vodopivec, Jože Pirjevec and Božo Repe, all of whom are considered to be close to left wing or left liberal positions, of nationalist bias.
