= Samo Resnik =

Slovenian activist and author (1962–2011)

Samo Resnik (1962 in Maribor – 9 April 2011 in Ljubljana) was a Slovenian journalist, essayist, political activist, writer and poet.

Samo Resnik was known for his political and literary essays, as well as writing and editing science-fiction stories. During his study of biology at the beginning of the 1980., Resnik became the editor of Slovenian student magazine Katedra. He later became the editor of another student newspaper, Tribuna, which was issued by Slovenian student organization. He was also the editor of Časopis za kritiko znanosti (Journal for the Criticism of Science).

He has written several books, including the 2003 novel called Dotiki, the 2005 collection of poems Prijaznemu dvomu and in 2009 a book of poems entitled Odpirati okna – včeraj, danes in jutri. He was co-editor of one of the first collection of science-fiction stories in Slovene called Fantazija (Fantasy).
