= Mladen Dolar =

Slovene philosopher, psychoanalyst, cultural theorist and film critic

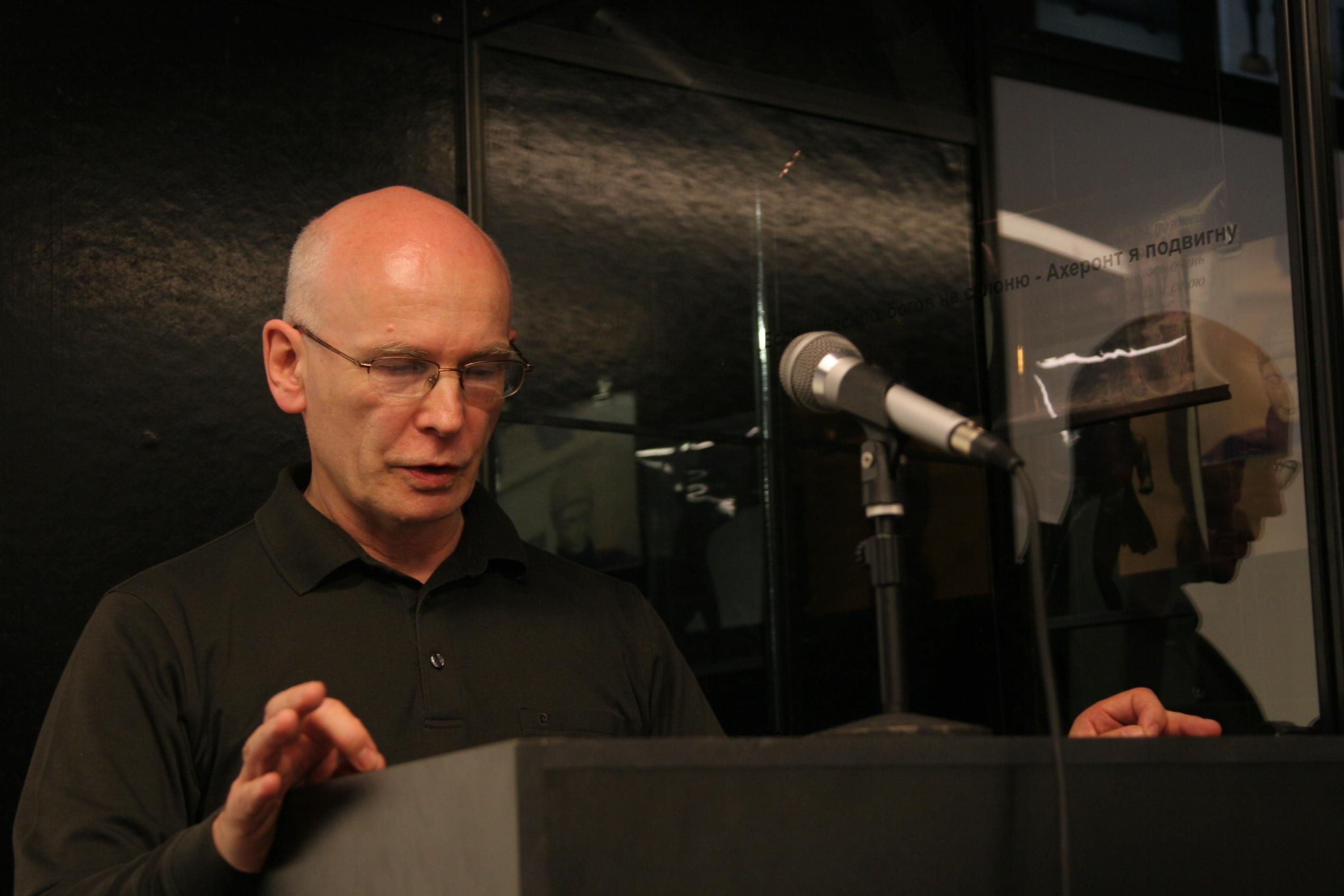
- Dolar in the Freud's Dreams Museum in 2011
- Born: 29 January 1951 (age 75); Maribor, PR Slovenia, FPR Yugoslavia

Education
- Education: University of Ljubljana; Université Paris VII

Philosophical work
- Era: 20th-/21st-century philosophy
- Region: Western philosophy
- School: Ljubljana school of psychoanalysis; Continental philosophy; Lacanian psychoanalysis; Post-Hegelianism
- Institutions: University of Ljubljana
- Main interests: Ideology; Marxism; ontology; political theory; psychoanalysis; cultural studies; film theory; German idealism; dialectic
- Notable ideas: Voice as objet a Over-identification

Mladen Dolar (born 29 January 1951) is a Slovene philosopher, psychoanalyst, cultural theorist and film critic.

== Biography ==
Dolar was born in Maribor as the son of the literary critic Jaro Dolar. In 1978 he graduated in Philosophy and French language at the University of Ljubljana, under the supervision of the renowned philosopher Božidar Debenjak. He later studied at the University of Paris VII and the University of Westminster.

Dolar was the co-founder, together with Slavoj Žižek and Rastko Močnik, of the Society for Theoretical Psychoanalysis, whose main goal is to achieve a synthesis between Lacanian psychoanalysis and the philosophy of German idealism.

Dolar has taught at the University of Ljubljana since 1982. In 2010 Dolar began his tenure as an Advising Researcher in theory at the Jan Van Eyck Academie, Maastricht, The Netherlands. His main fields of expertise are the philosophy of G. W. F. Hegel (on which he has written several books, including a two-volume interpretation of Hegel's Phenomenology of Mind) and French structuralism. He is also a music theoretician and film critic.

Dolar's A Voice and Nothing More, a study of the voice in its linguistic, metaphysical, physical, ethical, and political dimensions, has been translated into six languages.

== Bibliography ==
=== Books in English ===
- Opera's Second Death (with Slavoj Žižek). New York, NY; London: Routledge, 2002. ISBN 0-415-93017-0
- A Voice and Nothing More. Cambridge, MA; London: The MIT Press, 2006. ISBN 978-0-262-54187-9
- What's in a Name?. Ljubljana: Aksioma – Institute for Contemporary Art, 2014. ISBN 978-1-312-65543-0
- Janez Janša and Beyond (with Jela Krečič, Robert Pfaller, Slavoj Žižek). Ljubljana: Aksioma – Institute for Contemporary Art, 2018. ISBN 978-961-93930-5-5
- Rumors. Cambridge, UK; Hoboken, NJ: Polity Press, 2025. ISBN 978-1-5095-6171-1
