= European Graduate School =

Swiss private university

Coordinates: 46.11457°N 7.92939°E

- Type: Private graduate school
- Established: 1994
- Founders: Paolo Knill; Wolfgang Schirmacher
- Parent institution: The European Graduate School Foundation
- Dean: Margo Fuchs Knill (AHS), José Miguel Calderon (AHS), Christopher Fynsk (PACT)
- Chief Academic Officer: Christopher Fynsk
- Location: Visp, Switzerland (Administrative Office); Saas-Fee, Switzerland; Valletta, Malta
- Website: www.egs.edu

The European Graduate School (EGS) is a private graduate school that operates in two locations: Saas-Fee, Switzerland, and Valletta, Malta.

== History ==
The European Graduate School was founded in 1994 in Saas-Fee, Switzerland by the Swiss scientist, artist, and therapist, Paolo Knill. It was co-founded by the Swiss Canton of Valais, which is represented in its board. The school initially offered programs in Expressive Arts Therapy, as part of a broader initiative to develop a network of training institutes in Expressive Arts Therapy. A division of Media and Communication (later renamed Philosophy, Art and Critical Thought) was established in 1998 by Wolfgang Schirmacher.

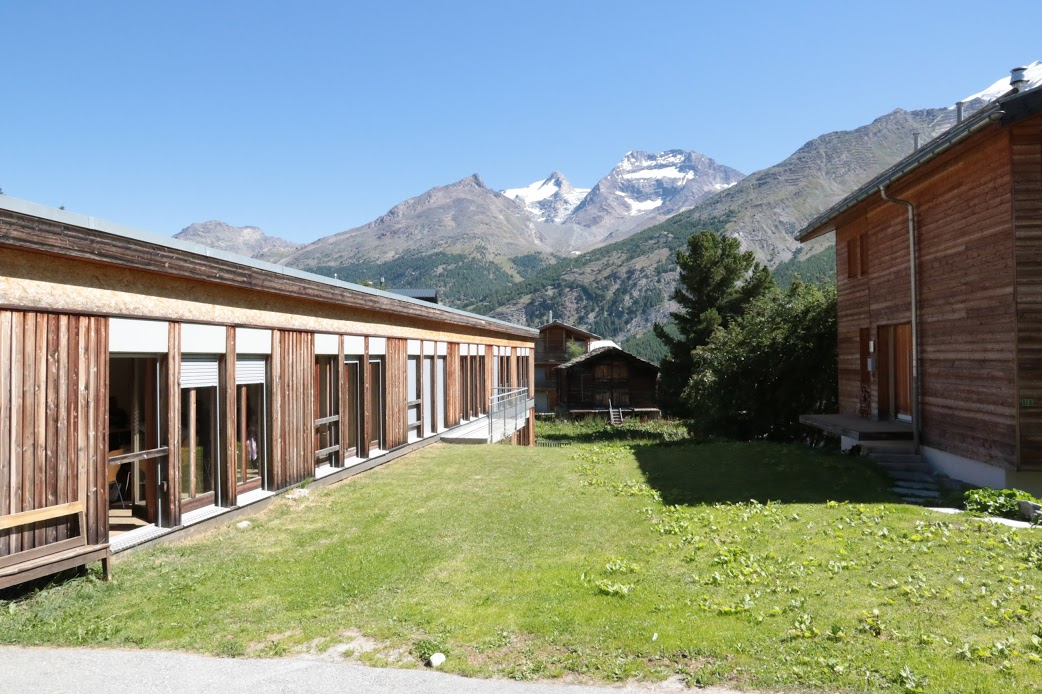
EGS Campus

EGS is licensed as a university in Malta and is recognized in the Swiss canton where it operates, but is not recognized by the Swiss University Conference, the main regulatory body for universities in Switzerland. Teaching is mostly remote, with required attendance for short periods at the school; ad hoc meetings in various cities also take place.

== Notable faculty ==
Notable faculty members have included:

- Giorgio Agamben,
- Chantal Akerman,
- Isabelle Alfandary
- Pierre Alféri
- Alain Badiou
- Jean Baudrillard
- Judith Butler
- Claire Denis
- Jacques Derrida
- Bracha Ettinger
- Donna Haraway
- Catherine Malabou
- Achille Mbembe
- Jean-Luc Nancy
- Jacques Rancière
- Avital Ronell
- Sandy Stone
- Paul Virilio
- Sha Xin Wei
- Krzysztof Zanussi
- Slavoj Žižek
- Alenka Zupančič

== Notable alumni ==
Notable alumni and attendees have included:

- Bruce Barber
- Gael García Bernal
- Pablo Iglesias Turrión
- Lara Khaldi
- John Maus
- Ariana Reines
- Duane Rousselle
- Kathy Slade
- Micah White

== See also ==
- Global Center for Advanced Studies
