= Jelica Šumič Riha =

Slovenian philosopher, political theorist and translator

Jelica Šumič Riha (born 1958) is a Slovenian philosopher, political theorist, and translator, associated with the Ljubljana school of psychoanalysis.

== Biography ==
Riha studied philosophy at the University of Ljubljana, graduating in 1983. Initially member of the League of Communists of Slovenia, she left the party in October 1988, together with 32 other left wing intellectuals, as a protest against the Ljubljana trial, when four civilians were arrested by judged by a Yugoslav military court. In 1989, she was one of the co-founders of the Debate Club 89, which became the intellectual core of the Liberal Democratic Party.

Between 1995 and 2005, she taught philosophy at the University of Ljubljana. She is currently a researcher at the Institute of Philosophy of the Scientific Research Center of the Slovenian Academy of Sciences and Arts, and also teaches at the University of Nova Gorica.

She is married to the Slovenian philosopher Rado Riha.

Šumič Riha's research topics include ethics, political theory, and psychoanalysis. She has written extensively on the relations between legal systems, ethics and politics. She has written on the philosophy of Alain Badiou, Jacques Ranciere, and Giorgio Agamben. She also dealt, among other, with the political theory of Carl Schmitt and Hans Kelsen. She has translated works by Sigmund Freud, Karl Marx, Ernesto Laclau, Chantal Mouffe, Jacques Lacan, Claude Lefort, Jean-François Lyotard, and others.

== Major works ==
- Realno v performativu ("The Real in Performative", Ljubljana, 1988).
- Pravo in razsodna moč ("Law and Judgement", Ljubljana, 1993), co-authored with Rado Riha.
- Avtoriteta in argumentacija ("Authority and Argumentation". Ljubljana, 1995).
- Totemske maske demokracije ("Totemic Masks of Democracy". Ljubljana, 1996).
- Singularité dans la psychanalyse, singularité de la psychanalyse ("Singularity in Psychoanalysis, Singularity of Psychoanalysis". Paris, 1998). Co-authored with Michel Deguy.
- Mutacije etike ("The Mutation of Ethics". Ljubljana, 2002).
