= Damijan Stepančič =

Slovene painter and illustrator (born c. 1969)

- Born: May 22, 1969; Ljubljana, Slovenia
- Education: Academy of Fine Arts, Ljubljana
- Known for: painting, illustrating, children's books
- Notable work: Children's books illustrations
- Awards: Levstik Award; 2003 for Leteči krožnik na našem vrtu Levstik Award; 2011 for Zgodba o sidru

Damijan Stepančič (born 22 May 1969) is a Slovene painter and illustrator, best known for his children's books illustrations.

Stepančič was born in Ljubljana in 1969. He graduated from the Academy of Fine Arts in Ljubljana in 1996 and his creative work focuses on illustration for children's books and journals.

He was included on the IBBY Honour List for 2010. He won the Levstik Award twice, in 2003 for Leteči krožnik na našem vrtu (A Flying Saucer in Our Garden), and in 2011 for Zgodba o sidru (The Story of the Anchor).

== Illustrated works ==
- O zmaju, ki je želel biti kralj (About The Dragon Who Wanted to Be King), written by Slavko Pregl, 2012
- Kako so videli svet (How They Saw The World), co-author with Lucija Stepančič, 2011
- Ali te lahko objamem močno? (Can I Hug You Hard?), written by Neli Kodrič Filipić, 2011
- Čudežni prstan (The Magic Ring), written by Peter Svetina, 2011
- Pravljica o črnem šejku z rdečo rožo (The Tale of the Black Sheikh with the Red Flower), written by Vitomil Zupan, 2011
- Ko bom velik/a, bom ... (When I Grow Up I Will Be a ...), author and illustrator, 2010
- Zgodba o sidru (The Story of the Anchor), author and illustrator, 2010
- Dama z železnim ugrizom in druge zgodbe (The Dame With an Iron Bite and Other Stories), written by Evald Flisar, 2010
- Martinček in dinozavri (Little Martin and the Dinosaurs), written by Lucija Stepančič, 2010
- Škripajoča nočna omarica (The Squeaking Night Table), written by Tatjana Kokalj, 2009
- Majhnice in majnice (Budding Songs, Maying Songs), written by Tone Pavček, 2009
- Ana in Bučko: abecerimarija (Ana and Bučko: Rhyming Alphabet), written by Tone Pavček, 2009
- Naročje kamenčkov, (An Armful of Pebbles), written by Saša Vegri, 2009
- Antonov cirkus, (Anton's Circus), written by Peter Svetina, 2008
- Pesmi iz pralnega stroja, (Poems from the Washing Machine), written by Peter Svetina, 2006
- Mihec gre prvič okrog sveta (Mikey Goes Around the World for the First Time), written by Andrej Rozman - Roza, 2006
- Ukleti Kamurkam (The Enchanted Kamurkam), written by Ruža Lucija, 2005
- Ujeti ribič (The Captured Fisherman), written by Slavko Pregl, 2005
- Leteči krožnik na našem vrtu (A Flying Saucer in Our Garden), written by Janja Vidmar, 2002
