= Anton Peterlin (physicist) =

Slovenian physicist (1908–1993)

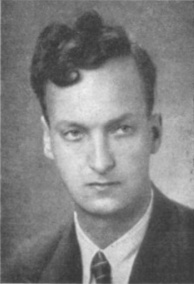
- Anton Peterlin 1947
- Born: 25 September 1908; Ljubljana
- Died: 24 March 1993 (aged 84); Ljubljana
- Education: University of Ljubljana
- Known for: Polymer physics FENE-P
- Awards: Bingham Medal (1970); Prešeren Award (1955)
- Scientific career
- Fields: Physicist
- Workplaces: University of Ljubljana, Technical University of Munich, Research Triangle Institute, Duke University, National Bureau of Standards

Anton Peterlin (25 September 1908 – 24 March 1993) was a Slovenian physicist.

== Life and career ==
Peterlin was born in Ljubljana, Slovenia. After receiving his D. Sc. in physics from Humboldt University of Berlin in Berlin, Germany in 1938, Peterlin accepted in 1939 the chair as a professor of physics at the University of Ljubljana, where he remained for 22 years. Besides his pedagogical duties, he accepted in 1947 the position of the founding director of the Jožef Stefan Institute in Ljubljana. In 1960, Peterlin left his home country. In order to be able to continue his theoretical research on macromolecules he accepted the position of a full professor and head of the Institute of Physics at the Technical University of Munich, Germany. Only a year later he relocated to North Carolina where he was entrusted with the directorship of the newly founded Camille Dreyfus Laboratory at the Research Triangle Institute, which was almost entirely devoted to basic research on polymers. He also served as adjunct professor at Duke University. Upon his mandatory retirement in 1973 at age 65, Peterlin left for Washington, DC to become a senior scientist at the National Bureau of Standards, now National Institute of Standards and Technology, a post he held until 1984.

== Recognition and legacy ==
Anton Peterlin was an internationally acclaimed scientist, the author of nearly 400 scholarly publications. For his research he received the Prešeren Award (Slovenian highest scientific award) in 1955. He was awarded the Bingham Medal for rheology in 1970 and the American Physical Society's High Polymer Physics Prize for 1972. A specialist in polymers, Peterlin was a member of numerous scientific societies, including the American Physical Society, the Deutsche Kolloid Gesellschaft, the Deutsche Physikalische Gesellschaft, and the Slovenian Academy of Sciences and Arts. His son Boris Matija Peterlin is a distinguished biomedical researcher at the University of California, San Francisco. His grandson and namesake Anton Peterlin is an American soccer player.

Anton Peterlin died in Ljubljana.
