= Janez Janša =

Slovenian politician (born 1958)

His Excellency Janez Janša
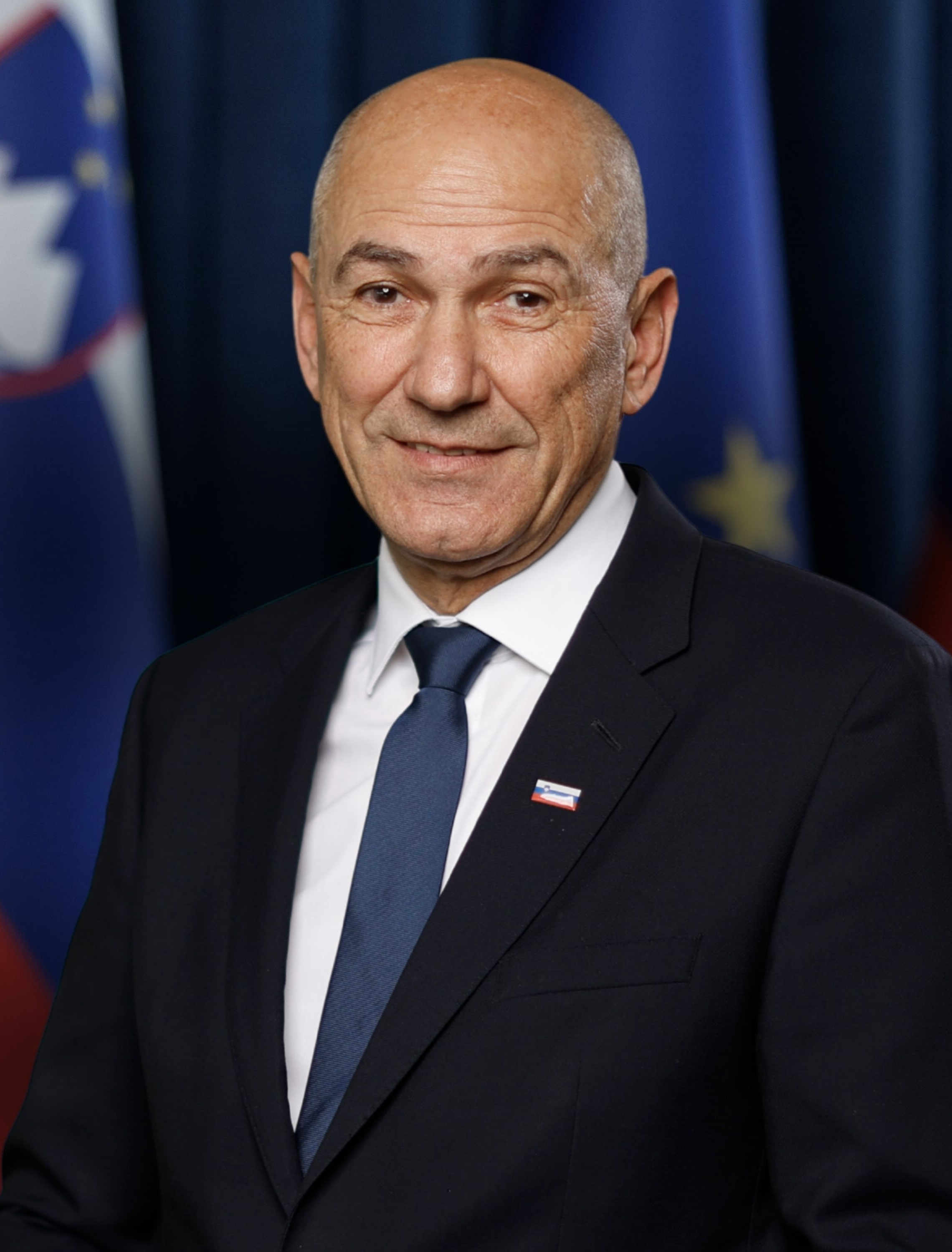
- Official portrait, 2026

Prime Minister of Slovenia
- Incumbent
- Assumed office 4 June 2026
- President: Nataša Pirc Musar
- Preceded by: Robert Golob
- In office 13 March 2020 – 1 June 2022
- President: Borut Pahor
- Preceded by: Marjan Šarec
- Succeeded by: Robert Golob
- In office 10 February 2012 – 20 March 2013
- President: Danilo Türk; Borut Pahor
- Preceded by: Borut Pahor
- Succeeded by: Alenka Bratušek
- In office 3 December 2004 – 21 November 2008
- President: Janez Drnovšek; Danilo Türk
- Preceded by: Anton Rop
- Succeeded by: Borut Pahor
Ministerial positions
Minister of Defence
In office 7 June 2000 – 30 November 2000
Prime Minister	Andrej Bajuk
Preceded by	Franci Demšar
Succeeded by	Anton Grizold
In office 16 May 1990 – 29 March 1994
Prime Minister	Lojze Peterle; Janez Drnovšek
Preceded by	Office established
Succeeded by	Jelko Kacin

Leader of the Slovenian Democratic Party
- Incumbent
- Assumed office 15 May 1993
- Preceded by: Jože Pučnik

Member of the National Assembly for Ljubljana Bežigrad
- Incumbent
- Assumed office 8 April 1990
Additional positions
President-in-Office of the European Council
In office 1 January 2008 – 30 June 2008
Preceded by	José Sócrates
Succeeded by	Nicolas Sarkozy

Personal details
- Born: Ivan Janša; 17 September 1958 (age 68) Grosuplje, PR Slovenia, FPR Yugoslavia
- Party: Slovenian Democratic Party (since 1992)
- Other political affiliations: League of Communists (1975–1983); Slovenian Democratic Union (1989–1991)
- Spouse: Urška Bačovnik (m. 2009)
- Domestic partner: Silva Predalič
- Children: 4
- Education: University of Ljubljana

Ivan Janša (Slovene: [ˈíːʋan ˈjàːnʃa]; born 17 September 1958), better known as Janez Janša ([ˈjàːnɛs]), is a Slovenian politician who has served as Prime Minister of Slovenia since 2026, a position he previously held from 2004 to 2008, from 2012 to 2013 and from 2020 to 2022. Since 1993, Janša has led the Slovenian Democratic Party, which has emerged as the pre-eminent Slovenian right-wing party.

Janša served as a minister of defence from 1990 to 1994, a post he had also held during the Slovenian War of Independence. He has also served as a prime minister from 2004 to 2008, and again became prime minister in 2012, following an early election in December 2011. On 27 February 2013, Janša's second government was ousted in a vote of non-confidence. In June 2013, Janša was sentenced to two years in prison on corruption charges. The ruling was confirmed by Slovenia's higher court in April 2014, but after the Constitutional Court of Slovenia ordered a retrial for procedural reasons, the case later expired. Despite his party winning a plurality of votes in the 2018 Slovenian parliamentary election, Janša was initially passed over as a prime minister candidate as most parties refused to join a Janša-led government because of Janša's right wing views. After spending years in opposition, Janša was selected as prime minister-designate in March 2020 following the resignation of prime minister Marjan Šarec. His third term as a prime minister ended on 13 May 2022. After four years in opposition, the Slovenian Democratic Party finished second in the 2026 elections and formed the 16th government of the Republic of Slovenia together with center-right parties, with Janša becoming Prime Minister for the fourth time.

A communist in his youth, Janša's political stance has drifted rightward during the course of his political career, from a liberal, pro-democracy dissident under communist rule, to a social democrat politician, and to a right-wing national conservative. Janša was a close ally of Hungary's former prime minister Viktor Orbán, although he disagreed with him on several points; Janša has repeatedly expressed support for Ukraine in the war against the Russian invasion in 2022, and also supports sanctions against Russia and increased military aid to Ukraine. Although Janša was also critical of European integration, as Prime Minister he respected European agreements and supported the enlargement of the European Union. His party also remained a member of the centre-right group of the European People's Party.

== Youth and education ==
Janša was born to a Roman Catholic working-class family of Grosuplje. He was called Janez (a version of the name Ivan; both are John in English) since childhood. His father was a member of the Slovene Home Guard, who were aligned with Nazi Germany, from Dobrova near Ljubljana who had escaped communist retaliation due to his young age.

Janša graduated from the Faculty of Sociology, Political Science, and Journalism of the University of Ljubljana with a degree in Defence Studies in 1982, and became employed in the Defence Secretariate of the Socialist Republic of Slovenia.

In 1975, aged 17, Janša joined the League of Communists, and became one of the leaders of its youth wing. He became president of the Committee for Basic People's Defence and Social Self-Protection of the League of the Socialist Youth of Slovenia (ZSMS). Janša was expelled from the party in 1983 after breaking with Yugoslav military orthodoxy by criticizing the system of people's self-defense from a radical left perspective. Janša appealed his ouster, but his appeal was denied. Despite the ejection, Janša touted his work in the party in a resume while applying for a job as a newspaper editor in 1985.

== Dissident ==
In 1983, Janša wrote the first of his dissident articles about the nature of the Yugoslav People's Army (JNA). In the late 1980s, as Slovenia was introducing democratic reforms and gradually lifting restrictions on freedom of speech, Janša wrote several articles criticising the Yugoslav People's Army in Mladina magazine (published by the League of Socialist Youth of Slovenia). As a result, his re-election as president of the Committee was blocked in 1984, and in 1985 his passport was withdrawn. During this period, Janša and his associates were held under closer watch by the Yugoslav secret police. Janša was also barred from gaining employment in any state institution or state-owned company. His job applications and articles were rejected. During this period, he earned his living writing computer programs and as a chance mountaineering guide.

Liberalization in the succeeding years allowed him to get work as secretary of the Journal for the Criticism of Science in 1986, and, a year later, to again begin publishing in Mladina. His Mladina articles consisted of critical opinion columns and articles on the topic of democracy and national sovereignty.

In the mid-1980s, Janša was employed in the Slovenian software company Mikrohit; in the years 1986 and 1987, Janša founded, together with his friend Igor Omerza (later high-ranking politician of the Slovenian Democratic Union and the Liberal Democracy of Slovenia), his own software company Mikro Ada.

He became involved in the pacifist movement, and emerged as an important activist in the network of civil society organizations in Slovenia. By the mid-1980s, he was one of the most prominent activist of the Slovenian pacifist movement. Janša also became active in the nascent environmental movement.

=== Rapprochement with the Socialist Youth movement ===
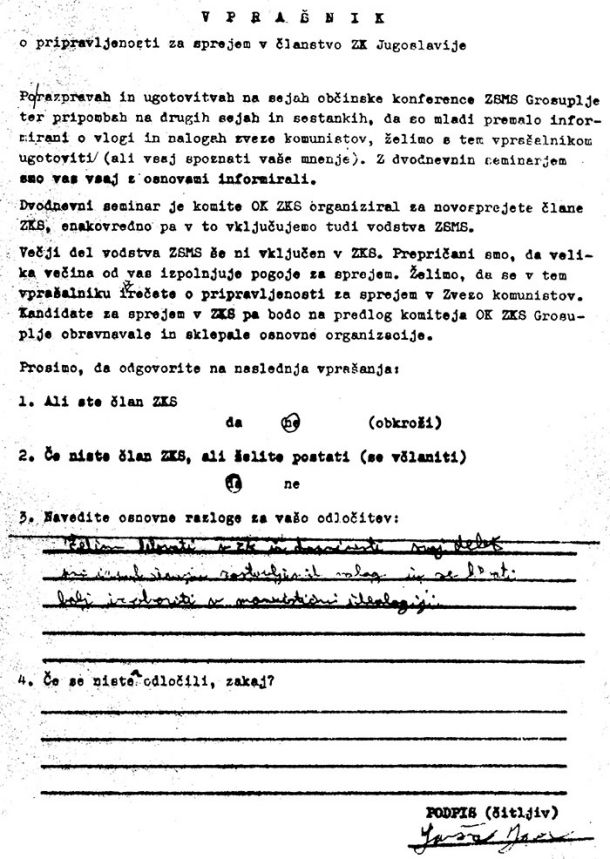
League of Communists questionnaire filled out by Janša

In 1987, Janša was approached by the family of the late politician Stane Kavčič, who had been the most important exponent of the reformist fraction in the Slovenian Communist Party in the late 1960s, and prime minister of Slovenia between 1967 and 1972; he was asked to edit the manuscript of Kavčič's diaries. Janša edited the volume together with Igor Bavčar. The publication of the book was part of the political project of Niko Kavčič, former banker and prominent member of the reformist wing of the Communist Party, to establish a new Slovenian left wing political formation that would challenge the hardliners within the Communist Party.

In the spring of 1988, Janša ran for president of the League of the Socialist Youth of Slovenia, a semi-independent youth organization of the Communist Party, which had been open, since 1986, also to non-party members. In his program, Janša proposed that the organization become independent of the Communist Party and transform itself into an association of all youth and civic associations; he also proposed that it rename itself the "League of Youth Organizations and Movements", and that it assume the role of the main civil society platform in Slovenia. During that time, he also participated in the public discussions on the constitutional changes of Yugoslav and Slovenian constitution.

=== Arrest and trial ===
On 31 May 1988, Janša was arrested on suspicion of possessing a classified Yugoslav military document uncovered during a search on the premises of a company where Janša was employed (a staff sergeant of the Yugoslav Army, Ivan Borštner, was arrested the same day on suspicion of leaking the document to Mladina). Along with two Mladina journalists, they were tried by a military court on charges of exposing military secrets, and given prison sentences. Janša's trial was conducted in camera, with no legal representation for the accused, and in Serbo-Croatian (the official language of the Yugoslav Army) rather than in Slovene.

Janša was sentenced to 18 months imprisonment, initially at Dob, but, following public outcry, he was transferred to the open prison in Ig. The case became known as the JBTZ affair and triggered mass protests against the government, and accelerated the process of democratization, known as the Slovenian Spring. The Committee for the Defence of Human Rights was formed following Janša's arrest, which became the largest grassroots civil society organization in Slovenia, gaining over 100,000 members within weeks.

Janša later accused Milan Kučan, the then-leader of SR Slovenia, of having accepted the Yugoslav Army's request for the arrest. Kučan, under pressure from the Yugoslav federal authorities, did in fact acquiesce to the searches that led to the subsequent arrests. Niko Kavčič, who was at that time considered Janša's political mentor, believed the arrest was organized by the hardliners within the Slovenian Communist Party who were angered by the publication of Stane Kavčič's diaries and wanted to prevent the formation of an alternative reformist movement.

The philosopher Slavoj Žižek, who at the time also worked as a columnist for Mladina, suggested that Janša was arrested because of his critical articles on the Yugoslav Army, and because the army wanted to prevent his election as president of the League of the Socialist Youth of Slovenia. As a consequence of his arrest, he could not run for the position; nevertheless, the leadership of the organization decided to carry on with the elections despite Janša's arrest. In June 1988, Jožef Školč was elected as president of the League instead of Janša.

As a protest against the League of the Socialist Youth of Slovenia's decision not to postpone the elections, Janša broke all relations with the organization. Janša was released after serving about six months of sentence, and became editor-in-chief of the Slovene political weekly magazine Demokracija (Democracy) shortly after his release, a position he held until May 1990, having been elected to parliament the previous month.

== Political career ==
=== 1990–1994: Foray into politics, minister of defence ===
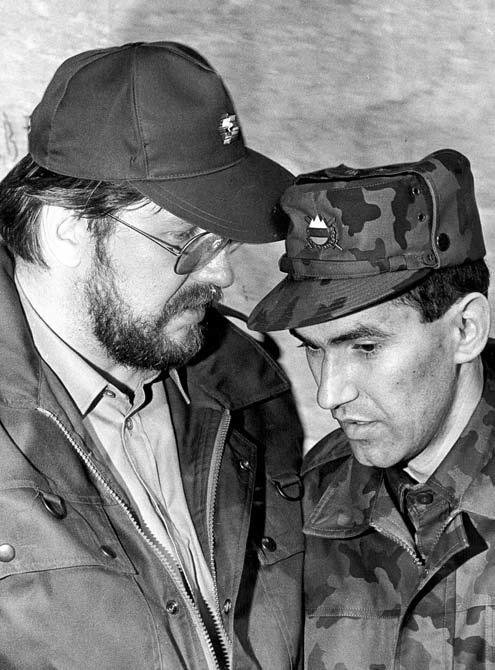
Igor Bavčar and Janša during the Ten-Day War

In 1989, Janša was involved in the founding of one of the first opposition parties in Slovenia, the Slovenian Democratic Union (SDZ) and became its first vice-president, and later president of the Party Council. Following the first free elections in May 1990, he became the minister of defence in Lojze Peterle's cabinet, a position he held during the Slovenian war for independence in June and July 1991. Together with the Minister of Interior Igor Bavčar, Janša was the main organiser of Slovenia's strategy against the Yugoslav People's Army.

In 1992, when the Slovenian Democratic Union broke into a liberal and a conservative wing, the leaders of the liberal fraction wanted to propose Janša as the compromise president of the party, but he refused the offer. After the party's final breakdown, he joined the Social Democratic Party of Slovenia (now called Slovenian Democratic Party) and remained Defence Minister in the centre-left coalition government of Janez Drnovšek until March 1994. In May 1993, he was elected president of the Social Democratic Party of Slovenia, a position he has held ever since.

==== Controversies and dismissal from ministerial post ====
Janša has been accused of having abused his position as defense minister to consolidate political power, engaging in arms trafficking to arm combatants in the Yugoslav Wars in violation of a United Nations arms embargo, and blackmailing prominent individuals, including politicians, businesspeople, journalists, and cultural and literary figures, by threatening to make public information (to which he was privy to in his ministerial role) regarding their previously undisclosed involvement with the former communist secret police.

In 1994, Janez Janša was dismissed by Prime Minister Janez Drnovšek from his role as Defence Minister because of his involvement in the Depala Vas affair (which centered around an incident in which military personnel arrested and mistreated a civilian off-duty undercover police associate that was attempting to obtain classified documents about the Ministry of Defence). SDS subsequently left the Drnovšek government as a result. The dismissal prompted protests by Janša's supporters and there were founded fears inside the government that Janša, backed by the nascent military, may refuse to relinquish power. A 2003 Mladina article alleged that Slovenia's military's special unit (MORiS) was in 1994 performing military exercises intended to prepare the force to carry out a military coup d'état. The police force was at the same time covertly preparing to secure the state and prevent a military takeover. In a press conference shortly prior to the article's publication, Janša pointed to documents detailing these police plans to secure state institutions to argue that a coup was in fact afoot against his Ministry. In a 1999 interview with Delo, Janša commented on the events of 1994, saying: "I held immense power in my hands. [...] And in 1994, when they were deposing me, there was a lot of suggestions that we not accept this removal. I could have done that. But I didn't." In 1995, Janša was charged for alleged illegal arms trafficking, but the case was never brought to trial.

=== 1994–2004: In opposition ===
In 1996 parliamentary elections, Janša's party's vote share rose significantly, from around 3.5% in the previous election to over 16%, becoming the third largest political party in the parliament and mounting an ultimately unsuccessful attempt to form a governing coalition. SDS largely remained in opposition for until 2004 years, save for a brief period in 2000 when it entered a short-lived centre-right government led by Andrej Bajuk,

During his time in opposition, Janša supported the government's efforts for integration into the EU and NATO. Between 2002 and 2004, he re-established cordial relations with now-President Drnovšek: in 2003, Drnovšek headed a round table on Slovenia's future based on Janša's recommendations.

==== Criticism as extremist ====
During this time, Janša was frequently accused of political extremism and radical discourse. Janša's former friend and fellow dissident Spomenka Hribar argues that his campaigns seem like conspiracy theories, and emphasize emotion, especially patriotic fervour, over rationality. The post-Marxist sociologist Rudi Rizman describes Janša's rhetoric as radical populism, close to demagoguery. The notion of "Udbo-Mafija", a term coined by the architect Edo Ravnikar to denote the illegitimate structural connections between the post-communist elites, is particularly prevalent in Janša's thought. Most critics agree that Janša is similar to other European radical right-wing populist leaders. Janša's rhetoric is nationalist and xenophobic, including verbal attacks against foreigners, especially from the other former-Yugoslav states, and "communists". Hribar considers these elements a form of extreme nationalism and chauvinism; to her, his irredentist claims towards Croatia seem obvious neo-fascism.

The sociologist Frane Adam instead explains Janša as the product of culture wars between the old communist elites and the hitherto disenfranchised elites of the right wing. The writer Drago Jančar similarly interprets the animosity against Janša as unjustified reactions of a culture unused to conservative political discourse.

Ahead of the 2004 electoral campaign, Janša turned towards moderation, tempering his radical language and attacks against alleged communists. Still, some critics continued to point out nationalistic rhetoric against immigrants.

=== 2004–2008: First term as prime minister ===
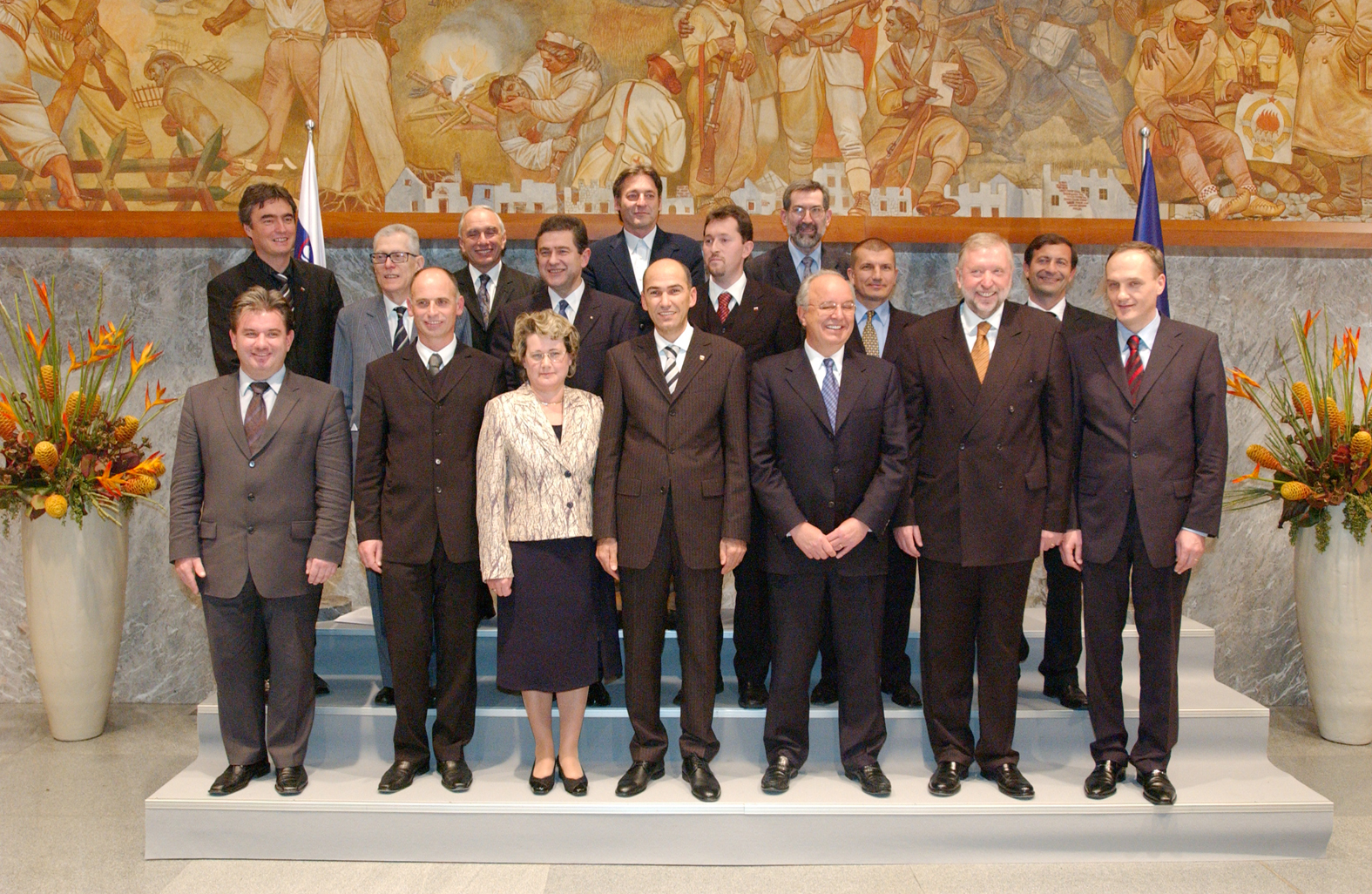
Janša's cabinet in 2004

Janša was prime minister of Slovenia for the first time from November 2004 to November 2008. During the term characterised by over-enthusiasm after joining the EU, between 2005 and 2008, the Slovenian banks have seen loan-deposit ratio veering out of control, over-borrowing from foreign banks and then over-crediting private sector, leading to its unsustainable growth.

It was also for the first time after 1992 that the president and the prime minister had represented opposing political factions for more than a few months. The relationship between Drnovšek and the government quickly became tense. After the landslide victory of the opposition candidate Danilo Türk in the 2007 presidential election, Janša filed a Motion of Confidence in the government on 15 November 2007, stating that the opposition's criticism was interfering with the government's work during Slovenia's presidency over the European Union. The government won the vote, held on 19 November, with 51 votes supporting it and 33 opposing it.

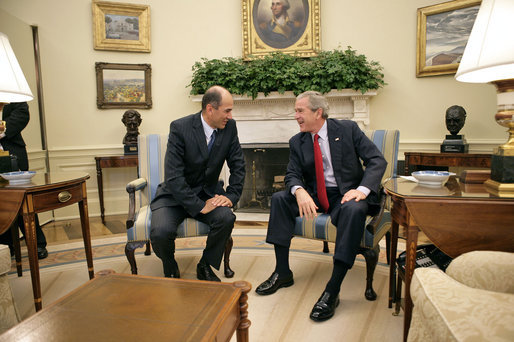
Janša with U.S. President George W. Bush in Washington, 10 July 2006

In the beginning of December 2011, several clips of the recordings of closed sessions of the Government of Slovenia during the term of Janez Janša were published on the video-sharing website YouTube.

Allegations were made against Janez Janša that he tried to subordinate Slovenian media. On 1 September 2008, some three weeks before the Slovenian parliamentary elections, allegations were made in Finnish TV in a documentary broadcast by the Finnish national broadcasting company YLE that Janša had received bribes from the Finnish defense company Patria (73.2% of which is the property of the Finnish government) in the so-called Patria case. Janša rejected all accusations as a media conspiracy concocted by left-wing Slovenian journalists, and demanded YLE to provide evidence or to retract the story. Janša's naming of individual journalists, including some of those behind the 2007 Petition Against Political Pressure on Slovenian Journalists, and the perceived use of diplomatic channels in an attempt to coerce the Finnish government into interfering with YLE editorial policy, drew criticism from media freedom organizations, such as the International Press Institute and European branch of International Federation of Journalists whose representative, Aidan White, IFJ general secretary, said "The (Janša's) government is distorting the facts, failing to tell Slovenians the truth and trying to pull the wool over the eyes of the European public about its attitude to media".

=== 2008–2011: In opposition ===
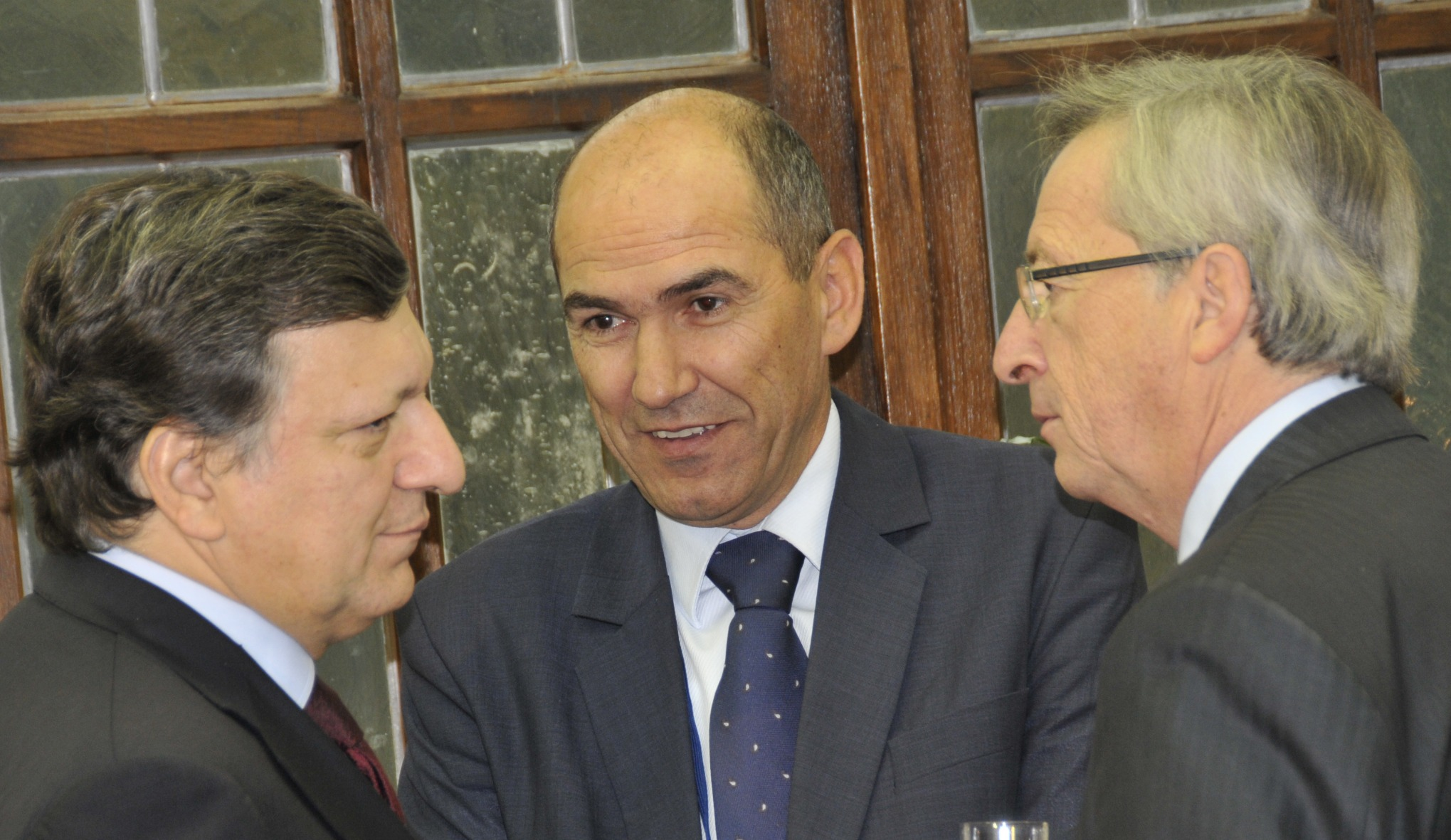
Janša meets with President of the European Commission José Manuel Barroso and Luxembourgish prime minister Jean-Claude Juncker at the EPP Summit in Meise, 16 December 2010

In the November 2008 parliamentary election, Janša's party placed second. Janša was replaced as prime minister by Borut Pahor, leader of Social Democrats.

In December 2011, Janša's party won second place in the Slovenian parliamentary elections. Since the prime minister-designate of the first-placed party, Positive Slovenia, Zoran Janković failed to secure himself enough votes in the National Assembly, and Danilo Türk, the president of Slovenia, declined to propose Janša as prime minister because Janša had been charged in the Patria bribery case, Janša was proposed as prime minister by the coalition of the parties SDS, SLS, DeSUS, NSi, and the newly formed Gregor Virant's Civic List on 25 January 2012. On 28 January he became prime minister-designate. His cabinet was confirmed on 10 February, and Janša became the new prime minister with a handover from Pahor on the same day. On 13 February the President received the new Government and wished them luck. Both parties agreed that good cooperation is crucial for success.

=== 2012–2013: Second term as prime minister ===
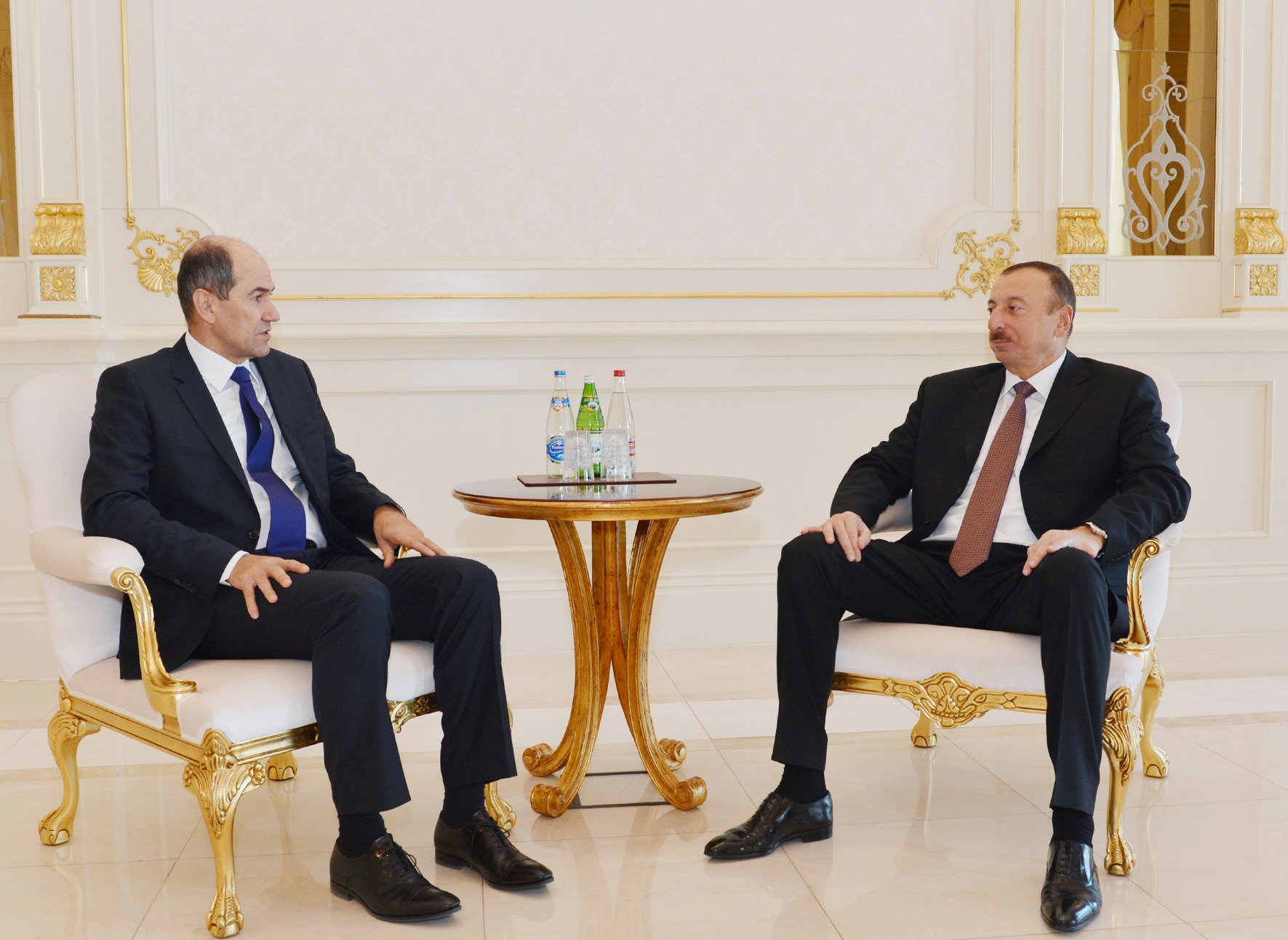
Janša with Azerbaijani President Ilham Aliyev, 16 January 2013

During his second term as prime minister, which lasted only one year, Janez Janša responded to the weakening of Slovenian economy during the global economic crisis and European sovereign-debt crisis with opening up old ideological fronts against liberal media, and against public sector – especially educational and cultural sectors, accusing them of being under influence of members of old regime (called Udbomafia and "Uncles from Behind the Scenes" (In Slovene: "strici iz ozadja")) and against everyone who doubted that the austerity measures forced upon Slovenia are the right ones.

Slovenian political elites faced the 2012–2013 Slovenian protests demanding their resignation.

In January 2013, the 2012–2013 Investigation Report on the parliamentary parties' leaders by Commission for the Prevention of Corruption of the Republic of Slovenia revealed that Janez Janša and Zoran Janković systematically and repeatedly violated the law by failing to properly report their assets. It revealed his purchase of one of the real-estate was indirectly co-funded by a construction firm, a major government contractor. It showed that his use of funds in the amount of at least 200.000 EUR, coming from an unknown origin, exceeded both his income and savings.

Immediately after the release of the report, Civic List issued an ultimatum to Janša's party to find another party member to serve as a new PM. Since Janša was ignoring the report and his party didn't offer any replacement for him, all three coalition parties and their leaders left the government within weeks and were subjected to ad hominem attacks by Janez Janša who accused the SLS's leader Radovan Žerjav of being "the worst (economics) minister in history of Slovenia", while the leader of the Civic List Gregor Virant has been mocked by Janša as engaging in "virantovanje" (a word game on kurentovanje, a Slovenian carnival festival). On 27 February 2013, Janša's government fell, following a vote of no confidence over allegations of corruption and an unpopular austerity programme in the midst of the country's recession. Gregor Virant welcomed the outcome of the vote, stating that it will enable Slovenia to move forward, either to form a new government or to call for an early election. Janša took over Ministry of Finance on 1 February.

=== 2013–2018: Return to opposition, court trial and imprisonment ===
Following the fall of his government, Janša decided not to resume his position as a member of the National Assembly. Instead, he decided to work for his party (SDS), write books, lecture at international institutes and help as a counsellor.

On 5 June 2013, the District Court in Ljubljana ruled that Janša and two others had sought about €2m in commission from a Finnish firm, Patria, to help it win a military supply contract in 2006 (Patria case). Janša was sentenced to two years while Tone Krkovič and Ivan Črnkovič, his co-defendants, were each sentenced to 22 months in prison. All three were also fined €37,000 each. Janša has denied the accusations, claiming the whole process is politically motivated. The following day, the Minister of Justice, Senko Pličanič, emphasised that the court ruling was not yet binding and therefore Janša was still presumed innocent.

Several hundred supporters had rallied outside the court to protest the ruling, while another group of people welcomed the outcome. In his first response, Janša stated he will fight with all available legal and political means to overturn the ruling at the superior court. He has also drawn parallels to the politically motivated JBTZ trial, where he was sentenced to prison 25 years ago. Members of SDS, NSi and SLS, the opposition parties, condemned the ruling. The coalition mostly abstained from comments. Borut Pahor, the president of Slovenia, stressed that the authority of the court should be respected, regardless of personal opinions. The ruling was welcomed by the members of the Protest movement and Goran Klemenčič of the Commission for the Prevention of Corruption of the Republic of Slovenia, who stated that the fight against corruption in Slovenia must continue.

==== Imprisonment and release ====
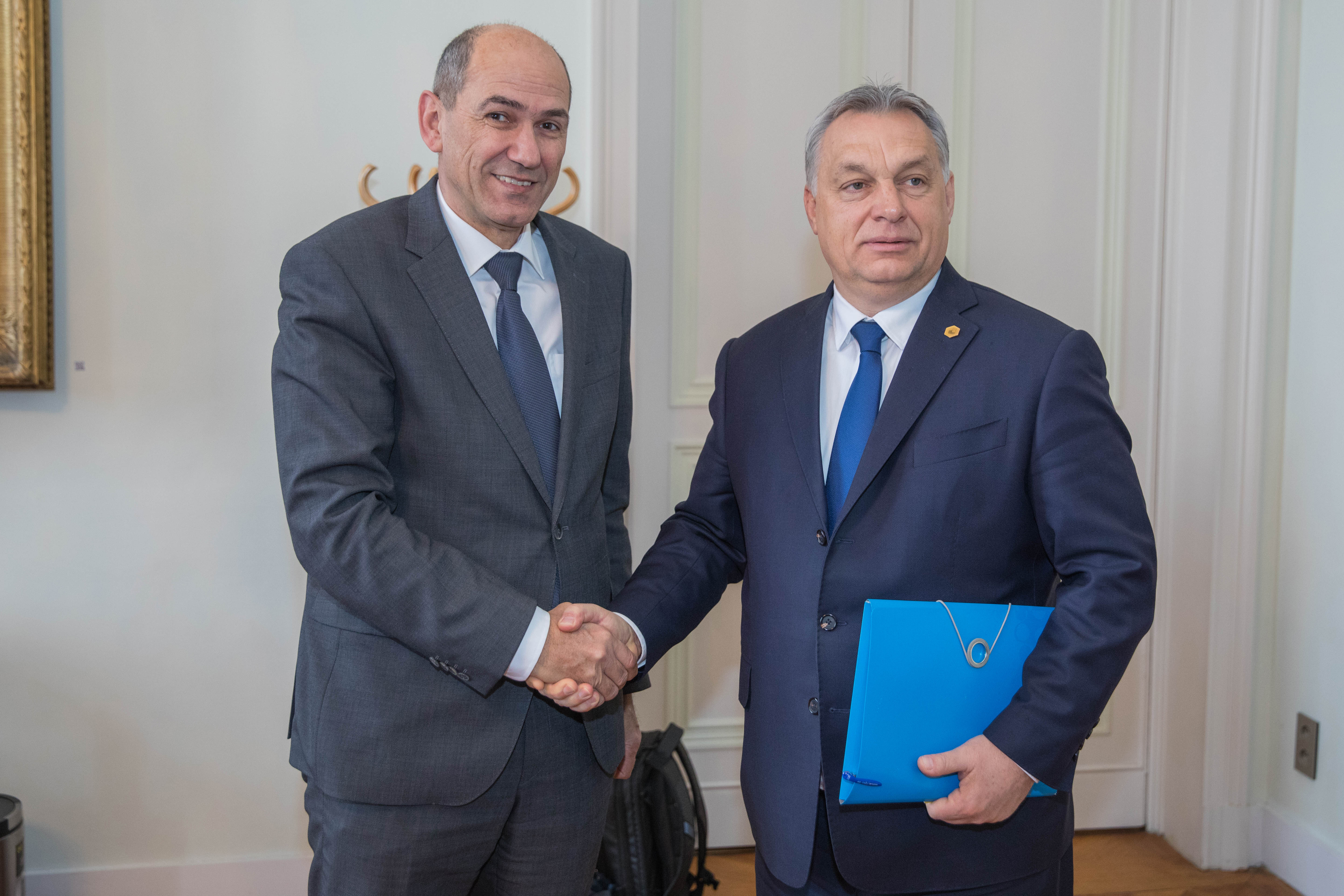
Janša with one of his closest allies, Hungarian prime minister Viktor Orbán at an EPP Summit, 22 March 2018

After the Constitutional Court of Slovenia with the majority of votes dismissed Janša's appeal due to him not having exhausted every other legal means available to him, on 20 June 2014 Janša started serving his prison term in Dob Prison, the largest Slovene prison. He was escorted there by about 3,000 supporters. The influential German centre-right wing newspaper Frankfurter Allgemeine Zeitung reported the following day that the domestic Slovene and the international law experts recognised large violations of Janša's rights in the court case. The case is to be reviewed by the Supreme Court, but this does not postpone the execution of the sentence that started just three weeks before the parliamentary election. Former constitutional judges criticised the decision of the Constitutional Court for being based on formalities instead of on the content, and commented that a large legal inconsistency in the process was discovered only in front of the Constitutional Court and that it will prevent the Supreme Court from not overturning the judgement. On 12 December 2014 Janša was temporarily released from the prison pending the review of the case by the Constitutional Court. The conviction was unanimously overturned by the Constitutional Court on 23 April 2015.

=== 2018–2020: Elections, from opposition to government ===
In the early election on 3 June 2018, Janez Janša was re-elected as a deputy. He was elected in the electoral district of Grosuplje and received 7,020 votes or 39.3%, the largest share of all candidates in the country. The Slovenian Democratic Party (SDS) won the election by receiving 24.92% of votes and gaining 25 seats out of 90 in the National Assembly.

=== 2020–2022: Third term as prime minister ===
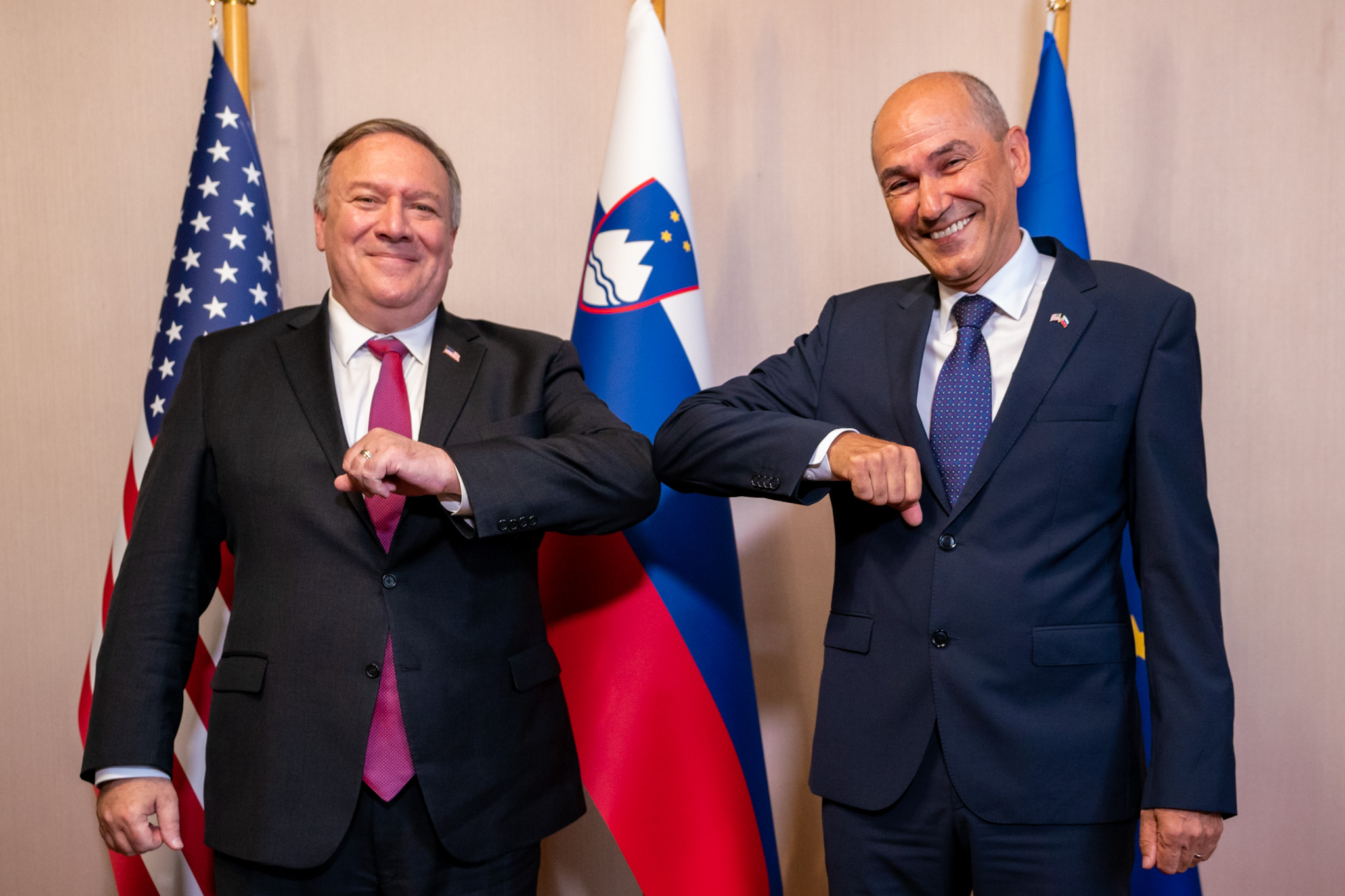
Janša alongside U.S. Secretary of State Mike Pompeo in Ljubljana, 13 August 2020

Following the resignation of Marjan Šarec as prime minister, Janša was elected as prime minister-designate on 3 March 2020, to form the 14th Government of Slovenia. He was sworn in on 13 March 2020.

On 4 November 2020, the day after the United States presidential election, Janša congratulated Donald Trump on his alleged reelection; he remained the only world leader to have done so when news organizations instead called the election for Joe Biden on 7 November.

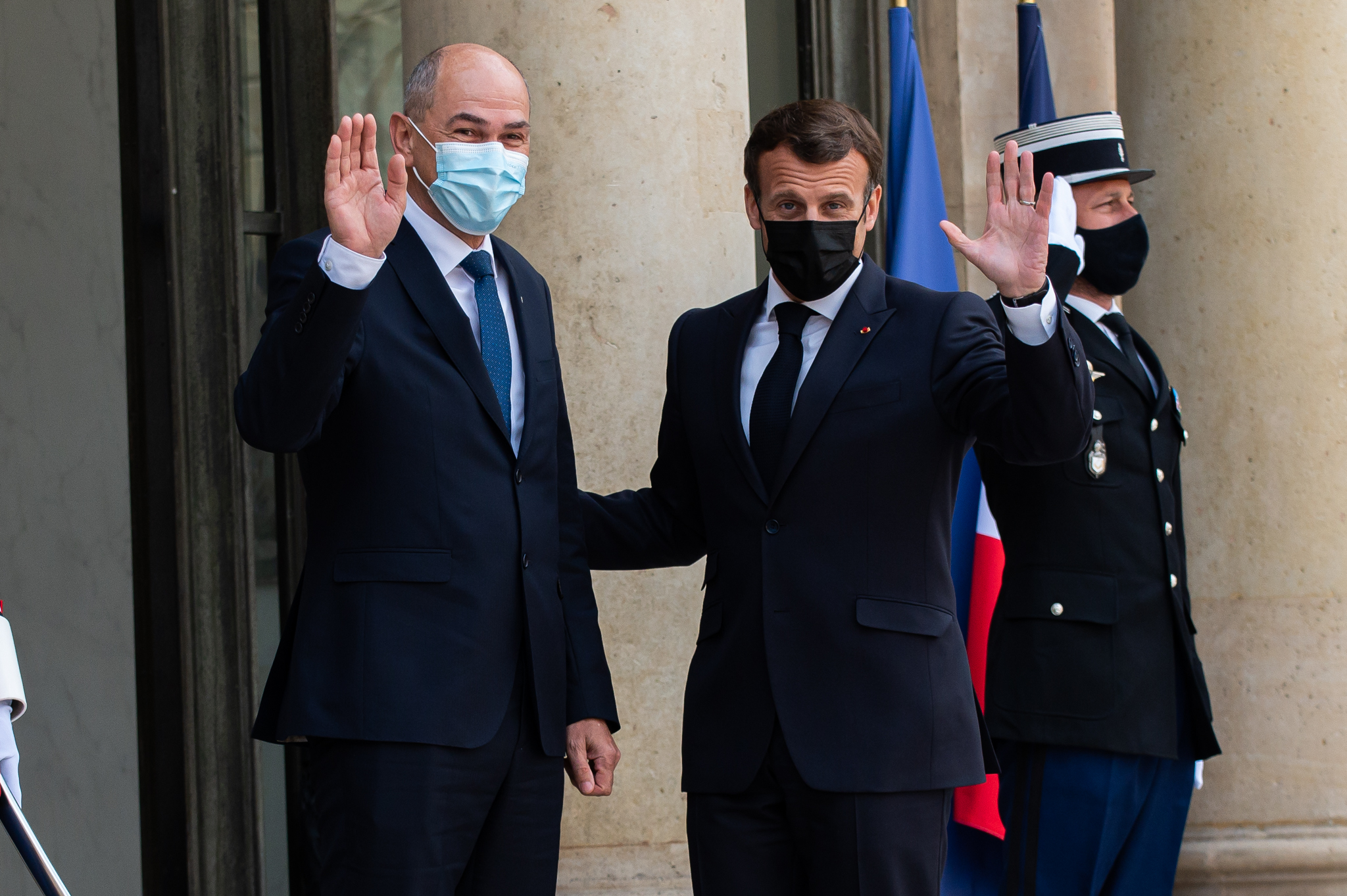
Janša with French President Emmanuel Macron in Paris, 6 July 2021

Janša described the Fall of Kabul to the Taliban in August 2021 as "the greatest defeat for NATO in history".

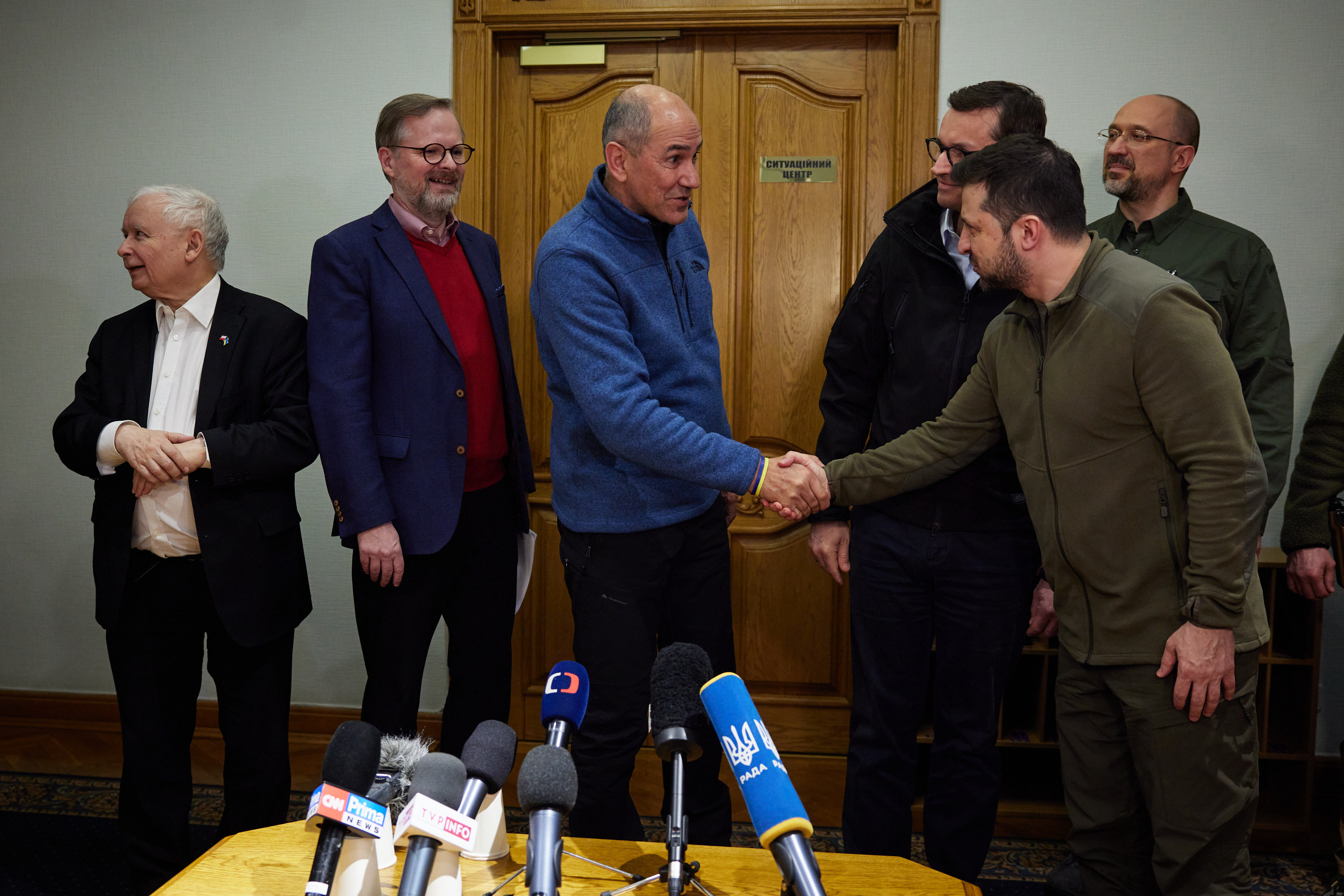
Janša greeting Ukrainian president Volodymyr Zelenskyy in Kyiv, 15 March 2022

After the start of the 2022 Russian invasion of Ukraine, on 15 March 2022, together with Polish prime minister Mateusz Morawiecki, Deputy Prime Minister Jarosław Kaczyński and Czech prime minister Petr Fiala, Janša went to Kyiv to meet with Ukrainian president Volodymyr Zelenskyy. The visit was aimed at supporting Ukraine's independence.

Janša's third term as prime minister ended on 13 May 2022. He was officially succeeded by Robert Golob on 1 June 2022.

==== Balkan non-papers ====
In April 2021, two documents, named the Balkan non-papers, which called for the "peaceful dissolution" of Bosnia and Herzegovina and the annexation of parts of Montenegro and North Macedonia into a Greater Serbia and Greater Croatia, as well as the unification of Albania and Kosovo, was said to have been created or distributed by Janša. The story of the non-papers was broken down by Bosnian web portal politicki.ba on 12 April 2021. The document's plans and ideas were heavily criticized and reacted to by many political leaders from Bosnia and Herzegovina, Serbia, Croatia, Montenegro, Slovenia and as well as by politicians from the European Union and Russia, including Russian minister of foreign affairs Sergey Lavrov and the European Commission's Vice-President and EU's High Representative for Foreign Affairs and Security Policy, Josep Borrell.

Upon the non-papers being sent by Janša, Bosnian Presidency member Šefik Džaferović sent a letter of concern to European Council President Charles Michel. After hearing news about the document, Janša spoke in a telephone call with Džaferović, stating that "there is no non-paper regarding border changes in the Western Balkans" and adding that he supports "the territorial integrity of Bosnia and Herzegovina."

=== 2022–2026: In opposition ===
In the campaign for the 2026 legislative elections, Janša announced the abolition of some tax burdens adopted during the government of Robert Golob, and in the field of foreign policy, he advocated continued support for Ukraine in its war with Russia. Regarding the worsening relations between Europe and the United States after US President Donald Trump expressed his aspirations to annex Greenland, Janša assessed that this type of communication in the NATO alliance was not appropriate, and that Trump's presidential term would be unsuccessful if he failed to end the war in Ukraine.

=== 2026–present: Fourth term as prime minister ===
After no party won a majority in the election, Janša was elected as prime minister by parliament after securing a coalition agreement with right-wing and anti-establishment parties on 22 May. His government was officially sworn in on 4 June.

The day after, Janša assumed his role as Prime Minister and ordered the removal of the Palestinian flag from the government building (In its place now fly the Slovenian, European, and Ukrainian flags). The Israeli Foreign Minister Gideon Sa'ar announced that Israel would open an embassy in Ljubljana, its first resident diplomatic mission in Slovenia. All sanctions on Israel, including the arms embargo, travel bans on Israeli politicians, and bans on Jewish imports from Judea and Samaria, were lifted. On 27 June 2026, Janša reiterated to Israeli media his intention that the Slovenian embassy to Israel in Tel Aviv would be relocated to Jerusalem. President Nataša Pirc Musar, as well as the confidence and supply party Resni.ca, voiced opposition to the relocation.

== Janšism ==
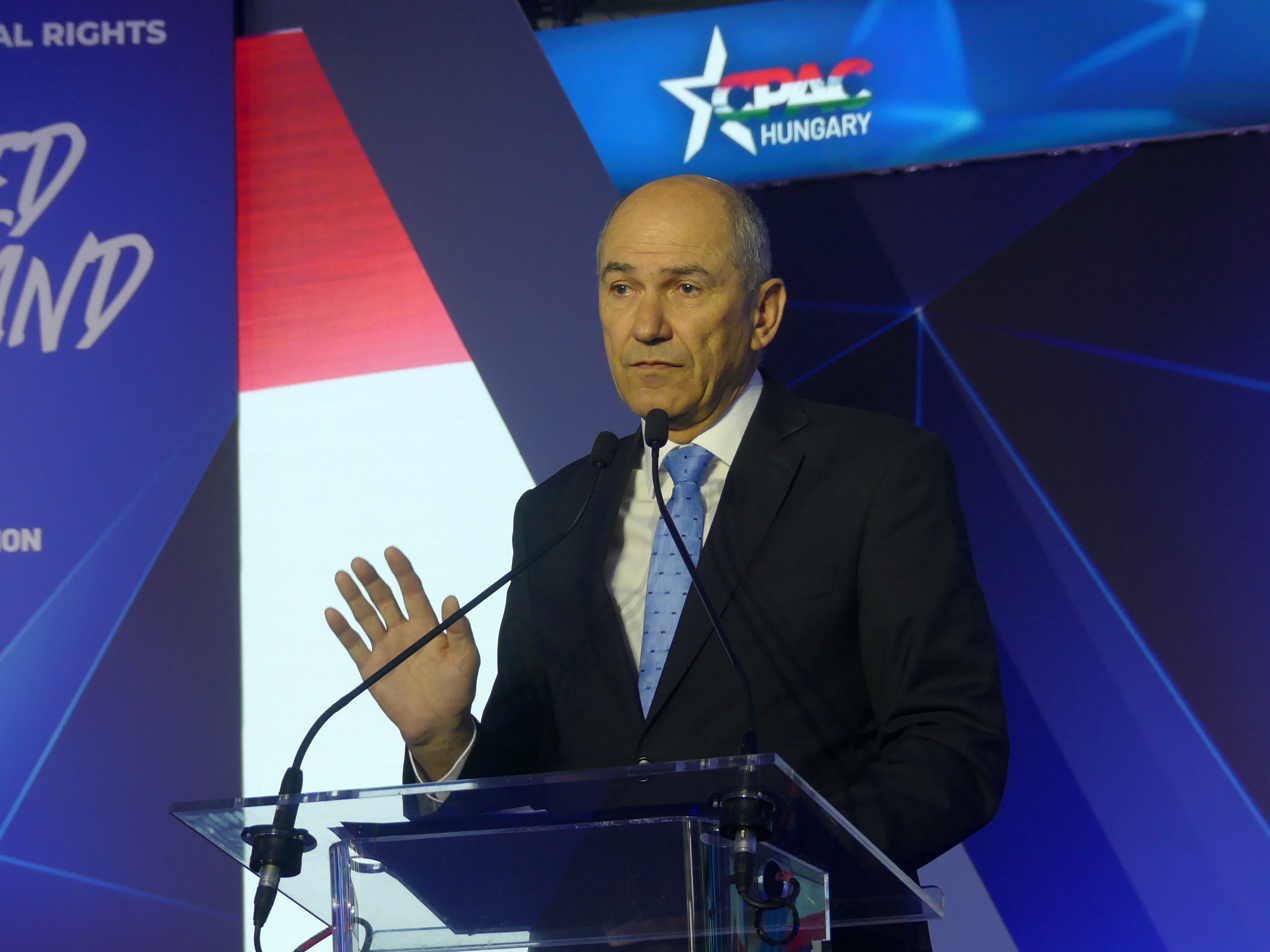
Janša addressing CPAC Hungary, 5 May 2023

Janšism (Slovenian: Janšizem) has been defined as "the political orientation developed and advocated by Janez Janša".

Tino Mamić, writing in Domovina, a conservative publication, writes that Janša's politics are not unique enough to warrant coining a neologism to describe them, and that the term is being used with the intent of discrediting Janez Janša.

=== Use during 2020 anti-government protests ===
The term has been used in slogans during the 2020 Slovenian protests to express opposition to the Third Janša Government. Police launched criminal investigations against several protesters after they displayed the slogan "Death to Janšism, freedom to the people" (word play on the Yugoslav Partisan slogan "Death to fascism, freedom to the people") after Janša had lodged criminal complaints against the protesters, however, the office of the district prosecutor did not recognise the slogans as a death threat against Janša or his supporters (as Janša had claimed). Instead, it determined that the phrase was intended to express opposition to the politics of Janša and/or his political party. In response to the decision, Janša addressed a letter to the state prosecutor general in which he admonished the prosecutor by threatening "you will be held personally responsible for any possible casualty of these organised death threats". The State Prosecutorial Council labelled the letter as unacceptable political pressure of the highest representative of the executive branch upon the state prosecutor general.

== Controversies ==
Janša has served as the leader of SDS ever since 1993 without a single other contender for the post. Party members are extremely loyal to Janša; it has been noted that the party appears to resemble a cult, with numerous past members claiming that Janša leads the party in an authoritarian manner and that no dissent is tolerated. SDS MEP Romana Jordan Cizelj was reportedly the only one within the party leadership to openly voice her doubts about Janša's continued leadership of the party whilst serving a prison sentence for corruption. Jordan Cizelj was subsequently not allowed to run for re-election as MEP on the SDS ticket as punishment for her disloyalty to Janša.

Janša is known as a prolific Twitter user, earning him the nickname Marshal Twitto (a reference to the honorary military title of (Marshal) Josip Broz Tito), Janša tends to be pugnacious in his interactions on the site, with one commentator describing him as "[...] using social media to insult journalists, political opponents, the general public, and anybody who does not agree with him", and The New York Times describing him as "[...] setting the benchmark for intemperate social media messaging by a national leader". He has also been known to proactively block people he dislikes on the site (including journalists and random users who had never interacted with him on the site). Janša has been sued for defamation after labelling a journalist a "washed-up prostitute" in a tweet. The case is to be litigated before the Constitutional Court. A 2020 analysis of Janša's more than 64.000 Twitter followers revealed that 73.3% were fake accounts. That year, Janša announced that the administrator of his Twitter user profile would remove fake accounts. Janša's large number of fake Twitter followers has been noted in the media for years. Janša was also a Parler user, inviting his Twitter followers to join him on the site in an English-language tweet. Janša followed several controversial far-right figures and conspiracy theorists on the site.

During a public spat with Janša, lawyer Lucija Ušaj Šikovec, a former SDS member and deputy leader of a newly formed far-right Homeland League party, accused Janša of controlling the party as an SDS satellite through its leader. After Janša accused her of leaving SDS because it didn't meet her demand to stand as the party's candidate for the 2019 European Parliament election, Ušaj accused him of lying and released a screen capture of a conversation between her and Janša in which he requested that "they" should astroturf an anti-immigration protest on the day that parliament was to discuss an SDS proposal for a referendum on immigration, explaining that "protests are effective if the action comes from below and appears to be a spontaneous uprising". Such a protest did in fact take place and was attended by some 200-250 people, among them the future leader of the Homeland League. Ušaj Šikovec threatened to release more compromising messages from Janša if he did not recant the statement.

=== Accusations of plagiarism ===
The largest and most notable Roman Catholic newspaper Družina and Janša have both claimed that the very few individuals who managed to survive the Kočevski Rog massacre included Janša's father, although the story of the actual survivor France Dejak, which was told in 1989 for the first time in Mladina, was re-told in detail as if it has been experienced by Janša's father.

In 2008, it was reported by the newspaper Mladina that Janez Janša copied a speech by Tony Blair, the prime minister of the United Kingdom. It was used in 2006 for the ceremony on the 15th anniversary of the Slovenian declaration of independence. His office responded with the claim that it was not copied but similar to Blair's speech, and that these were only a few phrases often used for such occasions. A few of these sentences were proclaimed the Spade of the Year by the newspaper Večer in 2006; the award is given annually to the best publicly expressed thought in Slovenia.

== Personal life ==
Janša is an active mountaineer, golfer, footballer, skier and snowboarder.

Janša had a long-term relationship with Silva Predalič, and they had two children, a son and a daughter.

Since July 2009, Janša has been married to Urška Bačovnik (MD) from Velenje. The two had been dating since 2006. In August 2011, their son Črtomir was born. Their second son, Jakob, was born in August 2013.

=== Author ===
Janša has published several books, the two of which are Premiki ("Manoeuvres", published in 1992 and subsequently translated into English under the title "The Making of the Slovenian State") and Okopi ("Barricades", 1994), in which he exposes his personal views on the problems of Slovenia's transition from communism to a parliamentary democracy. In both books, but particularly in Okopi, Janša criticised the then president of Slovenia Milan Kučan of interfering in daily politics using the informal influence he had gained as the last chairman of the Communist Party of Slovenia. He published a second edition of the same book: Dvajset let pozneje Okopi with some additional documents and personal views.

- Podružbljanje varnosti in obrambe ('The Socialization of Security and Defence', editor); Ljubljana: Republiška konferenca ZSMS, 1984.
- Stane Kavčič, Dnevnik in spomini ('The Memoirs of Stane Kavčič', co-edited with Igor Bavčar); Ljubljana: ČKZ, 1988.
- Na svoji strani ('On One's Own Side', collection of articles); Ljubljana: ČKZ, 1988.
- Premiki: nastajanje in obramba slovenske države 1988–1992; Ljubljana: Mladinska knjiga, 1992. English translation: The Making of the Slovenian State, 1988–1992: the Collapse of Yugoslavia; Ljubljana: Mladinska knjiga, 1994.
- Okopi: pot slovenske države 1991–1994 ('Trenches: the Evolution of the Slovenian State, 1991–1994'); Ljubljana: Mladinska knjiga, 1994.
- Sedem let pozneje ('Seven Years Later'). Ljubljana: Založba Karantanija, 1994.
- Osem let pozneje ('Eight Years Later', co-authored with Ivan Borštner and David Tasić); Ljubljana: Založba Karantanija, 1995.
- Dvajset let pozneje, Okopi II ('Twenty Years Later, Trenches II'). Ljubljana: Založba Mladinska knjiga, 2014.
- White Panther: the first book of The kingdom of Noric. London: IndieBooks, 2018.

Political offices
New office	Minister of Defence; 1990–1994	Succeeded by Jelko Kacin
Preceded by Franci Demšar	Minister of Defence; 2000	Succeeded by Anton Grizold
Preceded by Anton Rop	Prime Minister of Slovenia; 2004–2008	Succeeded by Borut Pahor
Preceded by José Sócrates	President of the European Council; 2008	Succeeded by Nicolas Sarkozy
Preceded by Borut Pahor	Prime Minister of Slovenia; 2012–2013	Succeeded by Alenka Bratušek
Preceded by Janez Šušteršič	Minister of Finance; 2013	Succeeded by Uroš Čufer
Preceded by Marjan Šarec	Prime Minister of Slovenia; 2020–2022	Succeeded by Robert Golob
Preceded by Robert Golob	Prime Minister of Slovenia; 2026–present	Incumbent
Party political offices
Preceded by Jože Pučnik	President of the Democratic Party; 1993–present	Incumbent
