= Alenka Puhar =

Slovenian journalist, author, translator and historian

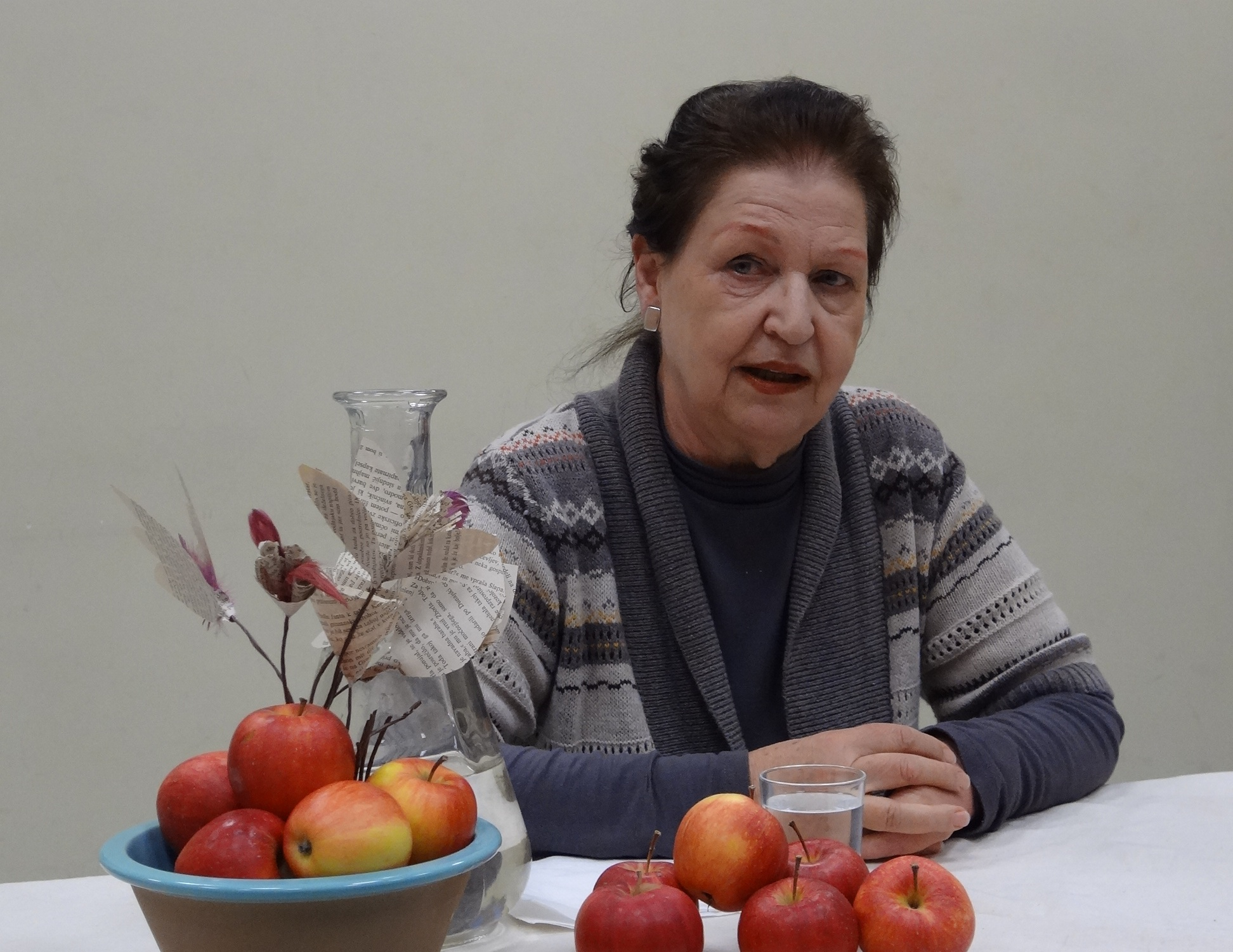
- Alenka Puhar in 2013
- Born: 4 February 1945 (age 81); Črnomelj, Slovenia, Yugoslavia
- Occupations: author, journalist, translator, historian
- Writing career
- Notable work: The Primal Text of Life

Alenka Puhar (born 4 February 1945) is a Slovenian journalist, author, translator, and historian. In 1982, she wrote a groundbreaking psychohistory-inspired book "The Primal Text of Life" (in Slovene: Prvotno besedilo življenja) about the 19th century social history of early childhood in Slovene Lands, then part of the Austro-Hungarian Empire. The book was in 2010 the subject of a television documentary that was in 2010 televised on the national RTV Slovenija. Her grandfather was the photographer and inventor Janez Puhar, who invented a process for photography on glass.

== Life ==
Alenka Puhar was born in Črnomelj to father France Mihelič, Slovene modernist painter, and mother Helena Puhar, a renowned pedagogue (an elementary school in Kranj was named after her). She was born in a south-eastern area of Slovenia liberated then by Slovene partisans, which her parents were members of, during World War II. She never lived with her father because he was later married to a writer Mira Mihelič, albeit they have been keep in contact. She is the half-sister of Gregor Tomc, a notable sociologist and punk rock musician, who was born from Helena Puhar's later marriage.

After finishing the Poljane Grammar School in Ljubljana, Puhar enrolled in the University of Ljubljana, where she studied English language and comparative literature. Among her professors was also the renowned philosopher and literary historian Dušan Pirjevec Ahac. After graduation, she worked as a journalist for the daily newspaper Delo, the most widespread newspaper in Slovenia at the time.

== Critical thought, psychohistory, and civic activism ==
In the 1970s, she started frequenting the intellectual circles of younger Slovenian dissidents, including the writer Drago Jančar, philosophers Spomenka Hribar and Tine Hribar, publicist and author Viktor Blažič and others.

In 1980, she became acquainted with psychohistory, while studying at City University of New York under the supervision of Lloyd deMause. Before and during breakup of Yugoslavia Alenka Puhar collected magazine covers, illustrations, newspapers cartoons from different members of then Yugoslavia to analyze fantasies that eventually led to breakup and war. And her article on "Yugoslav childhood" written by Alenka Puhar was published in Journal of Psychohistory a decade later in which she traced historical differences in early childhood between Slovenia and other more traditionalistic cultures, portraying individual and collective case studies, including Serbian traditionalistic ridiculing of Slovenia for not being as masculine as Serbia and analyzing what led Serbian traditionalistic men to rape 20000 to 50000 women during war in Bosnia.

In the 1980s, she became an active member of several civil society movements that challenged the official policies of the Titoist regime. In 1983, she was among the signers of a petition demanding the abolition of death penalty in Yugoslavia. Next year, she organized a petition of solidarity with Serbian intellectuals that were trialed in Belgrade for opposing the government policies. She became one of the co-editors of the alternative journal Nova revija. In 1987, she was among the co-founders of the Yugoslav section of the International Helsinki Federation for Human Rights. During the JBTZ-trial in 1988, when four Slovenian journalist were arrested by the Yugoslav People's Army and accused of revealing military secrets, she was elected on the board of the Committee for the Defense of Human Rights, which soon became the biggest civil society platform in Yugoslavia, with more than 100,000 individual members. The Committee organized the first free mass demonstration in Slovenia after 1945, held in May 1988 on the central Congress Square of Ljubljana.

She was active in several civil activities throughout the Slovenian Spring, a process of political democratization between 1988 and 1990, which led to the independence of Slovenia in 1991. Afterwards, Puhar returned to journalist work and started writing extensively on the history of Slovenian and Yugoslav dissidents between 1945 and 1990. Since 1994, she is member of the European Commission against Racism and Intolerance (ECRI), sponsored by the Council of Europe. She later described the emergence of democratic movements, punk and art groups, feminist, lesbian and gay rights groups in Slovenia as causing traditionalists in other members of then Yugoslavia calling Slovenia 'selfish, greedy, separatist, fascists, Germans' etc. deserving to be punished.

== Work ==
Alenka Puhar first gained recognition as a translator. In 1967 her translation of George Orwell's Nineteen Eighty-Four was published by a major publisher in Ljubljana: it was one of the first official editions of the novel in any of the Communist countries. She also translated works by Gore Vidal, Frederick Forsyth and Wole Soyinka to Slovene.

In 1982, she published her most well-known book, "The Primary Text of Life" (Prvotno besedilo življenja). The book, the title of which is taken from one of Ivan Cankar's short stories, was a combination of psychohistory and social history, in which she analyzed the condition of children in the Slovene Lands in the 19th century. The book raised delicate issues of sexual abuse, child abuse, and psychological terror in traditional Slovene rural society. It also produced a thorough psychological analyses of the texts of some major Slovene authors of the 19th and early 20th century, such as Josip Jurčič and Prežihov Voranc, and their representation of childhood. The book could not find a publisher in Slovenia and was issued in Zagreb. When it was published, it raised a controversy, in which Puhar was accused of portraying the history of Slovene family life in a terrible light. The book was however praised by many Slovenian scholars, including the prominent sociologist of family Katja Boh.

In 2004, Puhar edited and published the memories of Angela Vode, one of the major activists of the feminist movement in Slovenia in the 1920s and 1930s who was condemned in the so-called Nagode trial, a show trial staged by the Communist regime in 1947. In 2007, she was one of the authors of the volume "The Forgotten Half" (Pozabljena polovica), a comprehensive overview of notable Slovene women of the 20th century, edited by the Slovenian Academy of Sciences and Arts.

In 2010, she appeared in a documentary film on the history of childhood in Slovenia, together with Alenka Rebula Tuta. The film, entitled "Childhood" (Otroštvo), was produced by the Slovenian National Television Broadcast and aired during prime time in April 2010.

== Major works ==
- Prvotno besedilo življenja ("The Primary Text of Life". Zagreb: Globus, 1982);
- Peticije, pisma in tihotapski časi ("Petitions, Letters and Times of Smuggling". Maribor: Obzorja, 1985);
- Slovenski avtoportret 1918-1991 ("The Slovene Self-Portrait, 1918-1991. Ljubljana: Nova revija, 1992);
- Pozabljena polovica ("The Forgotten Half", co-edited with Marta Verginella et al.. Ljubljana: Slovenian Academy of Sciences and Arts).

== Sources ==
- Slovenska pomlad. (A webpage on the Slovenian Spring, run by the National Museum of Modern History in Ljubljana)
