= Gajabahu's invasion of Chola =

2nd-century invasion in southern India

- Part of Chola–Sinhalese wars
Date	c. 120 CE
Location	Early Cholas, Puhar or Uraiyur, South India

Belligerents
Anuradhapura Kingdom	Early Cholas

Commanders and leaders
Gajabahu I	Unknown

Strength
Unknown	Unknown

Casualties and losses
Unknown	Unknown;

King Gajabahu I is a prominent figure in Sri Lankan history. The main event of his reign is considered to be the liberation of 12,000 Sinhalese taken as prisoners to the Chola country during his father's time, and the return of several sacred artifacts to Sri Lanka.

== According to the Rajavaliya ==
The Rajavaliya, a text compiled in the 17th century related to the Kandyan Kingdom, provides a detailed and epic account of King Gajabahu's Indian expedition. According to the Rajavaliya, King Gajabahu, with the assistance of his chief warrior, Nila Maha Yodhaya, went to India by sea with a large army, across the Palk Strait.

King Gajabahu I initially unaware of the Chola invasion that had occurred during his father's reign, in which 12,000 Sinhalese were taken captive. After ascending to the throne, he would often roam the streets at night in disguise. On one such occasion, he learned about the prior Chola attack and the prisoners taken. Determined to avenge this defeat and reclaim the captives, King Gajabahu I swiftly assembled an army for an expedition to the Chola kingdom.

The Rajavaliya further explains this event: Nila Maha Yodhaya, one of King Gajabahu's warriors, split the sea with his club and reached the Chola king's capital. There he attacked and terrified the Chola king's guards, and performed heroic deeds such as catching the elephants in the city and making them fight each other to their deaths. When the ministers informed the king about this havoc in the city, the Chola king asked Gajabahu if the Sinhalese had come to destroy the city. Gajabahu replied, explaining that he had only come with a young boy and no army. Later, when the Chola king asked why he had come without a military force, Gajabahu stated that he had come to reclaim the 12,000 Sinhalese people who had been taken captive by the Chola king during his father's time.

But the Chola king refused this request. Gajabahu then became enraged and immediately threatened to destroy the city and turn it to ashes if he was not given his 12,000 people and another 12,000 (i.e., 24,000) as interest. With this declaration, he demonstrated his power by squeezing water from sand, using his club for the feat. In this way, Gajabahu intimidated the Chola king and received a total of 24,000 people, comprising the Sinhalese captives and an equal number of people as compensation.

In addition, he brought back to Sri Lanka the jeweled anklet of Goddess Pattini, the distinctive symbols of the gods from the four devalas (temples), and the bowl relic (doṇa dhātu) that had been brought during King Valagamba’s time. King Gajabahu then departed, sternly warning the Chola king not to repeat such actions in the future.

A detailed analysis of this Rajavaliya account exposes its shaky foundations. It is hard to believe that Gajabahu was completely unaware of an invasion if it had taken place in his father's reign. The Gajabahu story is not a historical episode at all, but a mythic one associated with water cutting (and probably other customs) and incorporated into the two Sinhala chronicles. Thus the reason the earlier Mahavamsa account did not mention the episode is that it simply did not take place historically.

== According to Tamil sources ==
In contrast, Tamil sources like Silappatikaram record the arrival of Gajabahu, a Sri Lankan king, as a friendly visit. Silappatikaram mentions him twice. The first notable incident is his prayer for Goddess Kannagi during his first journey with the Chola King Senguttuvan. It is also mentioned that he later re-established good relations and friendship with the Chola king.

According to these sources, it has been determined that this was not a military expedition. It is clear that both Gajabahu and Senguttuvan were dedicated to establishing renewed peace. However, the main sources of this period, the Mahavamsa and Silappatikaram, do not mention any violent acts. Furthermore, when questioning what was included in Silappatikaram, there are opinions that the meeting between Gajabahu and Senguttuvan may have been composed as a result of some poetic license.

== Uncertainty regarding historical truth ==
Due to these significant discrepancies among the Mahavamsa, Rajavaliya, and Tamil sources regarding King Gajabahu's Indian expedition, there remains some uncertainty about the true nature of the events. The epic descriptions found in the Rajavaliya can be considered a blend of legend and national pride, and it is important to take into account the silence of the Mahavamsa as well as the Tamil sources. A detailed analysis of this Rajavaliya account exposes its shaky foundations. It is hard to believe that Gajabahu was completely unaware of an invasion if it had taken place in his father's reign. The Gajabahu story is not a historical episode at all, but a mythic one associated with water cutting (and probably other customs) and incorporated into the two Sinhala chronicles. Thus the reason the earlier Mahavamsa account did not mention the episode is that it simply did not take place historically.
