= Gregor Tomc =

Gregor Tomc, also known as Grega Tomc (born 3 February 1952), is a Slovenian sociologist, musician and activist. In the late 1970s and 1980s, he was the founder and member of the Slovenian punk rock band Pankrti.

== Biography ==
Tomc was born in Ljubljana, Slovenia, then part of the Socialist Federal Republic of Yugoslavia. He is the younger half-brother of the columnist and historian Alenka Puhar. Their mother Helena Puhar was a renowned pedagogue and a partisan veteran from Kranj, who was a grandnephew of the photographer Janez Puhar, inventor of a process for photography on glass.

Tomc spent his high school years in New York City, where he became a fan of Bob Dylan and developed an interest in rock'n'roll music. He studied sociology at the University of Ljubljana. In 1977 he founded, together with his friend Pero Lovšin, the punk rock band Pankrti. He wrote almost all the lyrics of the group and for ten years he worked as their unofficial manager. Under the impression of the Helsinki Accords, he founded the association People for a Free Society in order to promote the notion of personal freedoms in the socialist society in Slovenia.

In 1982, he became a researcher in the Institute for Sociology of the University of Ljubljana, where he was the co-worker of the philosopher Slavoj Žižek. Together with fellow sociologists Frane Adam and Pavle Gantar, he formed a working group within the Institute for the study of contemporary subculture movements in Slovenia and Yugoslavia. He wrote in many Slovenian alternative and critical magazines, such as Problemi, Nova revija and Mladina. During the Slovenian Spring (1988–1990), Tomc was active in many political and civil society organizations participating in the democratization process in Slovenia, most notably the Committee for the Defence of Human Rights. In 1987, he was one of the 16 co-authors of the manifesto called "Contributions for a Slovenian National Program" published in the 57th issue of the journal Nova revija. In 1989, he was among the co-founders of the Social Democratic Party of Slovenia, but never actively participated in it. In the first free elections in 1990, Tomc unsuccessfully ran for the Slovenian Parliament as an independent candidate.

Since the 1990s, he has been working as a lecturer at the Faculty of Social Sciences of the University of Ljubljana. During all this period, he wrote essays and columns on contemporary political and social issues. Between 2004 and 2008, Tomc was an outspoken critic of the cultural policies of the centre-right Slovenian government led by Janez Janša. He entered active politics during the municipal elections of 2006, when he was elected to the Ljubljana city council on the List of Zoran Janković. He was an advisor for culture to Zoran Janković.

== Work ==
Gregor Tomc was, together with Frane Adam, one of the first Slovenian and Yugoslav sociologist to study the phenomena of contemporary social movements, with an emphasis of youth subcultures. He later turned to the study of cognitive psychology.

== Major works ==
- Od Poljske do Pol Pota ("From Poland to Pol Pot". Maribor, 1983);
- Druga Slovenija: zgodovina mladinskih gibanj na Slovenskem v 20. stoletju ("The Other Slovenia: History of Youth Movements in the Slovene Lands in the 20th Century". Ljubljana, 1989);
- Profano : kultura v modernem svetu ("Profane : Culture in the Modern World". Ljubljana, 1994);
- Small Societies in Transition: the Case of Slovenia: Transformation Processes in a Small Post-Socialist Society (co-editor with Frane Adam. Ljubljana, 1994);
- Šesti čut : družbeni svet v kognitivni znanosti ("The Sixth Sense: The Social World in Cognitive Science". Ljubljana, 2000);
- Mentalna mašina : možgani kot organski motor na duševni pogon ("Mental Machine: the Brains as an Organic Engine on Mental Fuel". Ljubljana, 2005).

== See also ==
- Punk rock in Yugoslavia
- New wave music in Yugoslavia
- Slovenian music

== Sources ==
- Profile on the webportal Slovenian Spring
