= TOMC =

TOMC or Tomc may refer to:

- Train of Many Colors, an excursion train of preserved and vibrantly schemed mid-20th century subway cars in New York City, New York
- Gregor Tomc (born 1952), Slovenian sociologist, musician and activist
- Romana Tomc (born 1965), Slovenian politician
