= Puhar =

Puhar may refer to:

== People ==
- Alenka Puhar (born 1945), Slovenian journalist
- Janez Puhar (1814–1864), Slovene priest, also known as Johann Pucher
- Janko Puhar (1920–1985), Yugoslav swimmer
- Mirjana Puhar, competitor in America's Next Top Model (season 21)
- Rok Puhar (born 1992), Slovenian long distance runner

== Places ==
- Puhar, Nagapattinam, Tamil Nadu, India
