= France Dejak =

France Dejak (20 September 1925, Dolenje Laze near Ribnica, Slovenia – 1 June 2003, Cleveland, Ohio, United States), later known as Frank Joseph Dejak, was a survivor of the Kočevski Rog killings of members of the Slovene Home Guard, repatriated by the British 5th Corps in Carinthia to the Titoist regime immediately after the World War II.

Dejak described the survival and escape many times after the end of the Cold war and he did it in detail for the first time in an interview published by Mladina magazine on 3 November 1989 to journalist Gorazd Suhadolnik. He, France Kozina, and Milan Zajec were the only survivors of the mass killing. They managed, with the help of a tree, which during the dynamiting slid down into the cave with its trunk still hooked on the edge of the cave, to climb out of it and to escape.

Dejak emigrated to the United States in 1949. He died in Cleveland, Ohio on 1 June 2003, aged 77.
