= Odon Peterka =

Slovene poet (1925–1945)

- Born: March 13, 1925; Jesenice, Kingdom of Serbs, Croats, and Slovenes (now Slovenia)
- Died: May 1945 (aged 20); Kočevje Rog, Federal Slovenia, DF Yugoslavia (now Slovenia)
- Occupation: Poet

Odon Peterka (March 13, 1925 – May 1945) was a Slovene poet.

== Life and work ==
Peterka was born in Jesenice, the son of Alojz Peterka (1883–1962), who had fought with Rudolf Maister. Peterka attended elementary school first in Domžale and then in Ljubljana, where he later enrolled in the classical secondary school. According to his sister Erna, he started to writing very early in elementary school, but he started producing seriously only later in high school.

=== Gonars and the Home Guard ===
Peterka was captured by the Italians at age 17 in a general raid on June 29, 1942, and sent to the Gonars concentration camp. He remained there until the Italian armistice. He then wanted to continue his education, but he gave it up in mid-December 1943 and joined the Slovene Home Guard together with his friends. At the end of the war, in May 1945, he retreated with other Home Guard members to Carinthia, from where he was returned from the camp at Viktring by the British and handed over to Yugoslavia.

=== Death and legacy ===
Peterka was killed in 1945, at 20 years old, in the Kočevje Rog massacres, and his body was thrown into one of the caves there. In his poem "Moj grob" (My Grave), the poet wrote about the premonition of approaching death, and a line from this poem, Nikdar ne boste našli moje jame 'You will never find my grave', also foreshadowed his fate.

Peterka, like the poet France Balantič, was suppressed under the postwar communist authorities, although his lyrics had exceptional artistic value. He is known for his more traditional forms (sonnets and quatrains), which contain carefully selected and lyrical language. In Buenos Aires, emigrants with the help of Uroš Žitnik, who sent the poems to Argentina, printed seven of Peterko's poems in 1977: "Adventum" (Advent), "Pomlad" (Spring), "Tihožitje" (Still Life), "Obeti" (Promises), "Smrti" (Deaths), "Moj grob" (My Grave), and "Vzdih" (Breath).
