= Frane Adam =

Slovenian sociologist

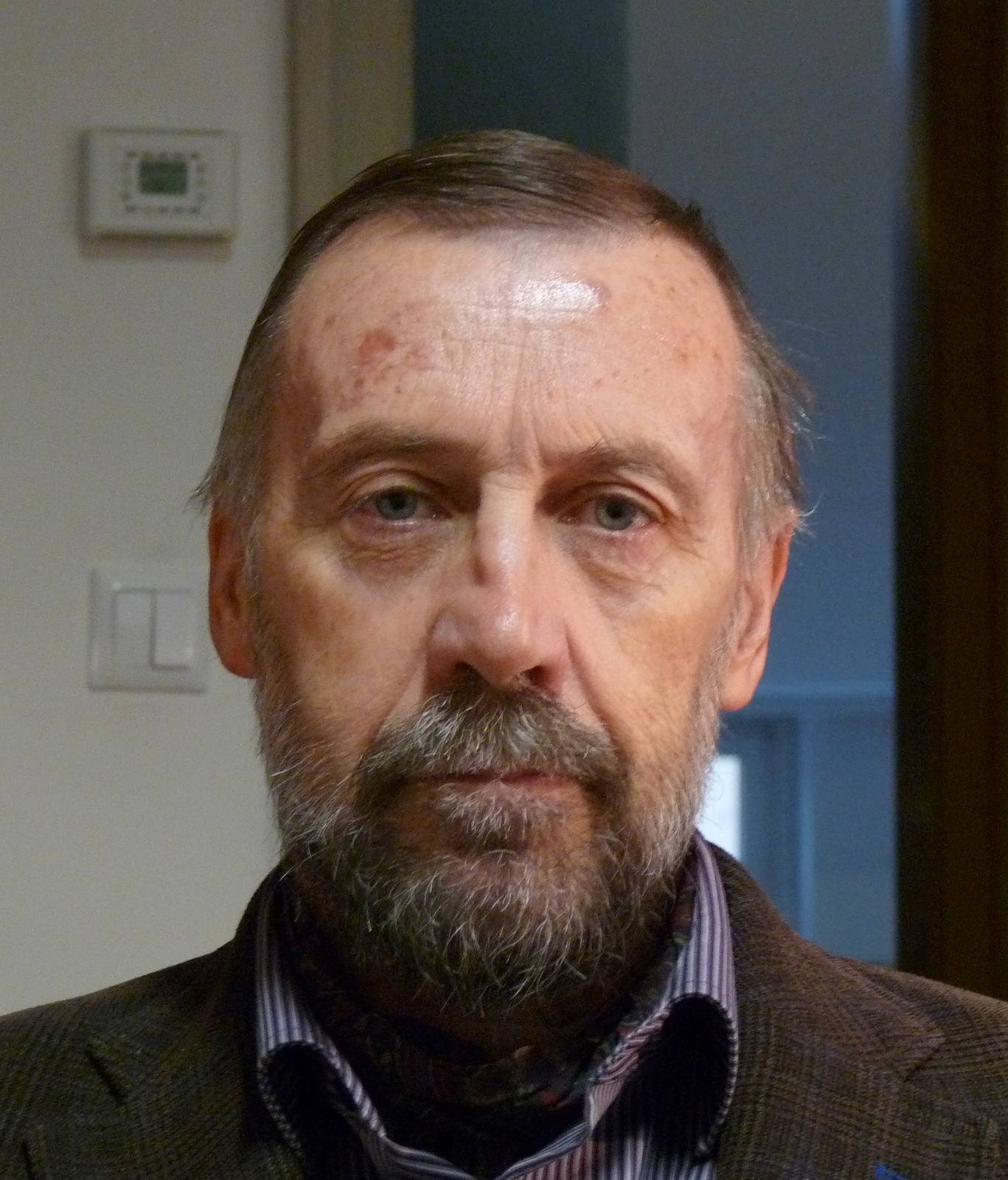
Frane Adam

Frane Adam (born 23 November 1948) is a Slovenian sociologist, editor and former dissident political activist. During the early 1970s, he was one of the leaders of the student protest movement in the Socialist Republic of Slovenia.

Adam was born in Pivka, Slovenia, then part of Yugoslavia. He studied at the University of Ljubljana, where he became one of the most prominent activists in the Slovenian student movement, which arose as part of the all-European protests of 1968. In 1972, he was arrested by the Communist authorities together with poet Milan Jesih. Their arrest triggered the occupation of the Faculty of Arts in Ljubljana by the students.

Adam achieved his PhD in 1981 at the University of Zagreb. He continued his academic career as a fellow researcher at the University of Konstanz and Bielefeld University.

In the 1980s, he became, together with Gregor Tomc, one of the first Slovenian and Yugoslav sociologists to study the phenomena of contemporary social movements, with an emphasis of youth subcultures. In the 1980s, he was active in the civil society movement in Slovenia and became one of the members of the Committee for the Defence of Human Rights.

Between 1989-1992, he was the chairman of the Slovenian Sociological Association.

He was also a fellow at the Scientific Centre for Social Research in Berlin.

He is currently teaching as professor at the School of Advanced Social Studies in Nova Gorica and at the Faculty for Social Sciences at the University of Ljubljana. He is the Director and Head of the research center Institute for Developmental and Strategic Analysis in Ljubljana.

His research interest is focused on comparative studies of elites and democracy, on theories and indicators of developmental performance as well as on the impact of social capital on knowledge transfer and regional innovation systems.
