= Committee for the Defence of Human Rights =

The Committee for the Defence of Human Rights (Slovene: Odbor za varstvo človekovih pravic) was a civil society organization in Slovenia, which functioned during the so-called Slovenian Spring between 1988 and 1990.

It was founded in Ljubljana on 31 May 1988, after the Counter-Intelligence Service of the Yugoslav People's Army arrested three Slovenian journalists and an officer of the Yugoslav People's Army, accusing them of revealing secret military documents. Among the arrested was also Janez Janša, a critical journalist of the popular alternative magazine Mladina. Immediately after the news of his arrest was released in Slovenian media, the Committee for the Defence of Rights of Janez Janša was founded. After it became known that the Yugoslav People's Army had arrested three other civilians, the Committee changed its name and widened its sphere of action.

During the trial against the four arrested (JBTZ trial), the Committee demanded that the trial be opened to the public, that the four be defended by a civilian lawyer and that the trial be conducted in Slovene rather than in Serbo-Croatian.

In the months following the arrest, the Committee became the most powerful civil society initiative in Slovenia, connecting a wide spectrum of individuals and organization. By spring 1990, when the Committee dissolved itself, it already counted around 100,000 individual members (around 5% of the whole population of Slovenia) and more than a thousand organizations. During the so-called JBTZ trial which followed the arrest, the Committee organized massive protests, and kept a constant pressure on the Communist leadership of the Socialist Republic of Slovenia. It also organized round table discussions and press conferences on the state of human rights in Yugoslavia and in Slovenia.

After the introduction of a multi-party system and the first free elections of 1990, the Committee dissolved itself. Many of its members became active in the Slovenian politics, especially in the DEMOS coalition and in the Liberal Democratic Party.

In the first month, the Committee was led by a six-member Presidency, composed by journalists Alenka Puhar, Bojan Korsika and Mile Šetinc, sociologists Pavel Gantar and Rastko Močnik, and presided by activist Igor Bavčar. Already in mid-1988, the Presidency was dissolved and a wide 32-member collegium was formed, which included many renowned public figures of the most various political and ideological convictions, including journalists Ali Žerdin, Viktor Blažič and Franco Juri, jurists France Bučar and Matevž Krivic, philosophers Slavoj Žižek and Spomenka Hribar, theologian Anton Stres, political theorist and historian Tomaž Mastnak, sociologists Rado Riha and Braco Rotar, rock musicians Gregor Tomc and Igor Vidmar, physician Dušan Keber, actor Boris Cavazza, poet Veno Taufer, and future politicians Lojze Peterle, Franc Zagožen, and Alojz Križman.

== See also ==
- Contributions to the Slovenian National Program
- Breakup of Yugoslavia

== Sources ==
- Webportal Slovenian Spring
