= Mladina =

Slovenian weekly left-wing political and current affairs magazine

- Logo
- Editor: Grega Repovž
- Categories: News magazine
- Frequency: Weekly
- Circulation: 20,000 per week
- First issue: 1920
- Company: Mladina časopisno podjetje d. d.
- Country: Slovenia
- Language: Slovene
- Website: www.mladina.si Mladina online

Mladina (English: Youth) is a Slovenian weekly political and current affairs magazine. Since the 1920s, when it was first published, it has become a voice of protest against those in power. Today, Mladina's weekly issues are distributed throughout the country. Mladina is considered one of the most influential political magazines in Slovenia.

Mladina has served as a hub for investigative journalism in Slovenia since the 1980s, when its pioneering "muckraking" reporting and critical (and then highly controversial) sociopolitical coverage helped spark the dissolution of Yugoslavia.

The magazine is published every Friday. It's also digitally published online, and its website maintains an expansive article archive.

== History and profile ==
Mladina has cycled through many iterations through its history spanning nearly a century, at times alternately operating under party or state control, or functioning as an independent-minded watchdog publication.

=== 1920–1945: Origins ===
Mladina was first founded in 1920 as the official herald of the Youth Section of the Yugoslav Communist Party in Slovenia. Thus, it was started as a youth magazine. After the prohibition of the Communist Party in 1921, the journal kept circulating in a semi-illegal manner. During this period, it was the herald not only of Communists, but of the radical leftist and anti-capitalist youth in general. Famous figures such as poet Srečko Kosovel (who also briefly served as editor), writer Ludvik Mrzel, and historian France Klopčič published in the magazine. In the 1930s, during the dictatorship of King Alexander I of Yugoslavia, Mladina ceased to exist due to government repression. It was re-established in January 1943 - during World War II - as the gazette of the underground anti-fascist resistance movement. After 1945, it was again transformed into the official herald of the Youth Section of the Communist Party of Slovenia.

=== 1945–1991: During communist Yugoslavia ===
In 1982, the Congress of the Alliance of Socialist Youth of Slovenia decided to transform Mladina by increasing its editorial autonomy, making it the voice of the growing internal opposition of the young Communists against the mainstream of the Slovenian branch of the League of Communists of Yugoslavia. By 1984, Mladina was in crisis. A new generation of editors then took charge and transformed the tired party journal into a teen fanzine, of which the sales at first rose to a modest 7,000 copies. However, the magazine's new direction encompassed not only pop event coverage; the newfound freedom was seized upon by Slovene intellectuals to turn the magazine into a political opposition outlet and the magazine soon became a popular opposition voice, immediately rising in popularity. Revelations of Slovenian corruption scandals increased its circulation to 30,000.

Thus, the magazine evolved into an "avant-garde, oppositional weekly", and by the late 1980s Mladina's main focus was promoting democratic transformation through its unrestrained political criticism. It pursued a change in focus from youth culture to exploring taboo political conflicts within Yugoslav society, including addressing human rights violations, freedom of speech and the press, economic issues and worker self-management, privileges of the Yugoslav political elite, repression of youth culture, ecology, and political repression, examined painful historical topics, and critiqued Josip Broz Tito's legacy, the Federal Government, the Communist Party and, especially, the Army. Mladina played an essential role in the development of a Slovenian civil society. "We tested the limits and tried to push everything further and further" said Franci Zavrl, the magazine's then editor, in a 1995 interview.

Mladina's colourful covers typically featured iconic satirical and provocative designs which came to symbolise the Yugoslavian civil reform and resistance movement. Its popularity peaked just prior to Slovenia's secession, reaching a weekly circulation of 65,000 issues, and becoming popular across Yugoslavia as the only "radically critical magazine" in mass circulation. It became a cult favourite for Yugoslav students and youth.

In 1987, the poster design contest for the annual Relay of Youth, a customary Yugoslav youth relay race intended to celebrate the birthday of Yugoslav leader Josip Broz Tito, was won by an entry by Neue Slowenische Kunst, a Slovenian avant-garde art collective. The design was later found to have been based on a Nazi propaganda art image by Nazi artist Richard Klein, restyled in the fashion of socialist realism which was traditionally favoured by the Yugoslavia state as a subtle protest of Tito's cult of personality. Mladina attempted to feature the image on its cover page, but the attempt was prohibited by censors; if Mladina indeed went through with the idea and went to print with the design on its cover, the magazine would have been outlawed. Instead, the editors decided to circumvent the ultimatum by publishing the image on the inner sleeve as a centrefold, printing a critical article discussing the affair under the title "In Place of a Cover" on the cover page instead.

Due to its influence and radical stances, Mladina was seen as an "enemy of the state" and was consequently monitored by the authorities because of its pacifist stance, manifested, among other things, in its firm opposition to Yugoslavia's arms sales to developing countries.

==== Late 1980s: Key role in the push for Slovenian independence ====
Mladina's reporting "pushed on the boundaries until they started to fall down"; the magazine had a direct and integral role in bringing about the dissolution of Yugoslavia.

During late 1980s, Mladina contributor Janez Janša provided the magazine's editor Franci Zavrl with a transcript of a LCY party meeting. The transcript revealed the Yugoslav federal authorities were pressuring SR Slovenia president Milan Kučan to clamp down on the increasingly irreverent and adversarial Mladina, and accused the magazine of being backed by the CIA. Mladina decided to publish excerpts from the party meeting transcript, an act prohibited by Yugoslav law. Kučan eventually bowed to pressure, and the secret police arrested Janša and obtained a classified military document during a raid; the jurisdiction of the investigation was thus transferred to the federal military authorities, and the investigation eventually culminated in the Ljubljana trial. Due to the mass protests and opposition to the proceedings against Janša and Mladina journalists, Kučan refused to curtail media freedom in Slovenia despite mounting pressure from federal authorities (including demands to shut down Mladina) and announced he would amend the Slovene constitution to gain greater autonomy from Belgrade, initiating Slovenia's drive toward independence. The subsequent attempts by SR Serbia president Slobodan Milošević and sections of the LCY to bring Slovenia back in line would eventually bring about the dissolution of Yugoslavia.

===== Ljubljana trial =====
Mladina's most tumultuous period was the spring of 1988; the magazine had a central role in the watershed Ljubljana trial (also known as the Trial against the Four (Slovene: Proces proti četverici), or the JBTZ Trial (acronym from the initials of the four men arrested). Yugoslav authorities also demanded the magazine be shut down.

In early 1988, four men were arrested and prosecuted for their handling of classified military documents found at Mladina's offices. The documents outlined Yugoslav People's Army's plans for imposing martial law in Slovenia in case of an emergency. One of the men arrested was freelance journalist and Mladina contributor/defense correspondent Janez Janša, at that time also a prominent member of the League of Socialist Youth of Slovenia (Janša later became the Prime Minister of Slovenia). The others arrested were two editors of the magazine (David Tasić and Franci Zavrl) and an army sergeant (Ivan Borštner). The arrest of two Mladina editors was strongly opposed by the public, and increased the magazine's circulation to 70,000. The magazine became increasingly popular across Yugoslavia despite language differences within the country. "We are the official press, they the alternative" proclaimed Mladina editors at a congress on alternative youth culture in Southern Europe in Bologna in December 1988.

The subsequent trial proceedings, held in Ljubljana, were conducted in Serbo-Croatian language rather than Slovene, causing fierce public discontent within SR Slovenia. The trial was a unifying time for Slovenes in the run-up to the country's separation from Yugoslavia and sparked mass protests in Ljubljana, including spontaneous daily demonstrations in front of the military court building where the trial was taking place (attended by some 15,000 people the day the verdict was announced). The Committee for the Protection of Human Rights (CPHR) was set up as result.

=== 1991–present: Independent Slovenia ===
Mladina's advocacy of "political pluralism, a tolerant, modern society, and a curbing of ethnic violence made it an important player in the establishment of an independent Slovene nation-state". The magazine's distribution and reach in other (former) Yugoslav republics largely ceased with the breakup of Yugoslavia. With the democratic transition, Mladina focused its coverage on holding the newly established political elite accountable, including its former contributor and increasingly controversial fledgling right-wing politician, Janez Janša, who owed his rise to national prominence to his work with the magazine. In 1990, Janša reportedly proposed to Mladina's editorial board that the magazine become the party publication for a political party he was in the process of forming, but was turned down. Janša has repeatedly sued Mladina columnist Vlado Miheljak.

The 2003 circulation of Mladina was 19,300 copies, making it the most read weekly in the country.

Mladina has accused the 2004-2008 Janša government of imposing an advertising embargo on Mladina and Dnevnik, two publications critical of the government, as part of Janša's efforts to control the media. Mladina reported that state-owned enterprises selectively and punitively ceased advertising in these publications, instead redirecting advert purchases to more friendly media. In response to the government attacks on its independence, Mladina found safe haven after being acquired by an Italian holding company established by Slovenian expatriate businessmen.

Mladina cartoonist, Tomaž Lavrič, won the 2017 Prešeren Award for his work (Lavrič had been previously nominated for the award). In April 2017, the Ljubljana Museum of Modern Art featured an exhibition of Mladina cover art and notable articles from the 1980s period.

In October 2017, a Mladina cover page illustration on the topic of the Catalan independence conflict (more specifically, the police violence perpetrated upon Catalans participating in a referendum declared unconstitutional by Spain) was refashioned as a graffiti mural in the Catalan city of Olot.

==== Constitutional Court, and European Court of Human Rights freedom of expression cases ====
In 2005, during a parliamentary discussion on same-sex civil unions, Slovenian National Party MP Srečko Prijatelj asked the assembly to "Imagine a father coming to pick his child up from school ..." after which Prijatelj imitated a man talking to his child in a stereotypical gay voice while enacting effeminate hand gestures. A Mladina journalist subsequently wrote in an article that Prijatelj's performance merely demonstrated the "average [intellectual] scope" of a "cerebral bankrupt". Prijatelj filed a libel lawsuit against the magazine in response. A lower court ruled in favour of the plaintiff and the ruling was upheld by a higher court. After the Constitutional Court dismissed Mladina's appeal, the magazine appealed to the European Court of Human Rights which in 2014 overturned the national courts' decision and vindicated Mladina. The ECHR's verdict found that Mladina's freedom of expression, as set out by the European Convention on Human Rights, was infringed upon, and ruled that the Slovenian state must pay Mladina €10,000 in damages due to the tarnished reputation the magazine sustained during the judicial process.

In 2011, Mladina published a satirical rubric comparing a family photo of the Nazi propaganda minister Joseph Goebbels, and that of Branko Grims, a Slovenian Democratic Party politician. Members of the Grims family filed three separate libel suits against Mladina (in one case also suing for damages due to the plaintiff's alleged emotional distress). After the Constitutional Court ruled in the plaintiff's favour in one of the cases, Mladina again appealed to the European Court of Human Rights (awaiting deliberation as of 2019), while two appeals, one by Mladina and one by Grims, are awaiting deliberation at the Slovenian Constitutional Court (as of 2019). Mladina has argued that its intention was not a personal affront to Grims and his family, but instead a critique of his demagogic political strategy of publicly flaunting his family life to appeal to voters based on ostensibly upholding traditional family values. 13th January of 2026 the European Court of Human Rights stated that Mladina was in the right and won the case because of the broad protection of political satire used by the court.

==== Parliamentary commission testimony ====
A parliamentary commission investigating alleged improprieties in stent distribution and procurement (headed by Slovenian Democratic Party MP Jelka Godec) called Mladina editor-in-chief, Grega Repovž, to testify; the Italian company KB 1909, which owned a majority share of Mladina via one of its subsidiaries, also owned a subsidiary involved in medical supplies distribution that was accused of illicit business practices. MP Godec stated her intention was to assess whether taxpayer funds obtained by the medical supplies company were being redirected to finance Mladina.

During his testimony, Repovž denied Godec's accusations, and claimed that KB 1909 entered into ownership of Mladina to insure the magazine's journalistic independence after political pressure from the Janša's government (led by Godec's SDS party). Repovž further stated that he personally arranged the acquisition deal with KB 1909 after the magazine's previous majority owner, Franci Zavrl (via his company, Pristop), said he was intending to sell the magazine to then PM Janša's brother if Repovž did not find another buyer. Repovž also said he had not experienced any editorial interference from the parent, despite Mladina's adversarial coverage of odious business practices in the Slovenian healthcare system. Repovž accused Godec of exploiting her investigative powers for discrediting him and the magazine for political purposes. Other commission members were also critical of the chair's inquiry into the magazine and questioned her motives. Slovenian Journalists' Association also condemned the inquiry, stating that actions of SDS politicians give the appearance that the commission was established for the sole purpose of discrediting the magazine, and pointing out that the commission also requested the magazine hand over confidential business documents, exceeding its legal authority.

==== European Parliament committee on money laundering testimony ====
In November 2017, Slovenian Democratic Party politicians convened and testified before a European Parliament special committee on money laundering (PANA committee) on money laundering allegedly carried out by Slovenia's state-owned Nova ljubljanska banka (NLB) to help the Islamic Republic of Iran circumvent international sanctions. The testimony included such dramatic proclamations as "Based on findings of EU and US institutions Iran expended funds, laundered through Slovenia, to finance: materials required for the construction of nuclear weapons, components of chemical weapons, and for spies that infiltrated nuclear, security, and defense institutions of the EU and US".

The Progressive Alliance of Socialists and Democrats also asked Mladina political reporter Borut Mekina to testify before the committee to present an alternate view on the matter. In response, the editor-in-chief of the SDS-affiliated Nova24TV penned an editorial describing Mekina as a "hack journalist", and Mladina as a "fake news" media organisation owned by parent companies incorporated in tax shelters and accusing the magazine of being indirectly owned by NLB. An English language version of the article was then distributed to all PANA committee members. Mekina responded by directing members to Mladina's Wikipedia page.

During his testimony, Mekina alleged that SDS was exaggerating the graveness of the affair for political reasons; in international terms, the amount of funds laundered through Slovenia was minuscule and the process less subversive, and numerous other European banks participated in the money laundering (and to a much greater degree). Mekina said that Anže Logar (who headed a Slovenian parliamentary investigative committee on banking and testified on behalf of SDS) uncovered information regarding the alleged money laundering operation in 2015 but SDS chose to sit on the information until just before the 2018 Slovenian parliamentary election for political reasons. Mekina also accused SDS of making numerous extremely misleading or blatantly false statements in its testimony (including SDS's assertion that Logar's life was in danger due to his investigative efforts). Mekina portrayed the money laundering by European banks as part of a larger disagreement between Europe and the US on Middle East policy. Mekina also pointed out that SDS had similarly accused president Danilo Türk of "international terrorism" before the international community in 2010. In closing, he accused SDS of fomenting an apparent state of national emergency by appealing to transnational institutions (which, in contrast to domestic ones, would take the party's assertions at face value), all in search of political and electoral gain.

==== Orbán cover page caricature and diplomatic row with Hungary ====
Mladina has long been known for its satirical and politically provocative covers. On March 22, 2019, Mladina published an issue with the feature article detailing Slovenian Democratic Party committed backing of Fidesz within the European People's Party, thus preventing Fidesz's expulsion from EPP. The issue also featured a comical cartoon cover portraying Hungarian MP Orbán giving a Nazi salute and wearing a Hungarian flag armband while being amorously embraced by SDS politicians (with one of them holding a Slovenian flag featuring the Hungarian tricolor). Mladina's cover was widely covered by Hungarian opposition media.

The portrayal of Orbán was strongly rebuked by Hungary's ambassador to Slovenia, and by the Hungarian press secretary. The ambassador's protest was lampooned by the magazine, which published a "corrected and courteous" cover, now portraying Orbán, with a flower in his hair, extending an olive branch, while Mladina's cartoonist jestingly published a sarcastic "apology".

On April 5, the Slovenian Foreign Ministry dismissed a formal request by the Hungarian embassy on the topic of the contentious Mladina cover that called on Slovene authorities to assist the Hungarian government in preventing "similar incidents" from occurring in the future. The Ministry responded by stating "[we] strictly respect the freedom of speech and freedom of the press and would never interfere in any of the media's editorial policy". Hungary's request was condemned by the Slovenian Journalists' Association, multiple MPs of Slovenia's governing coalition, the president, prime minister, and other prominent politicians.

== Content ==
The magazine's content typically includes editorials, op-eds/columns, news coverage, investigative reporting, political and social analysis and commentary, interviews, cultural and scientific coverage (e.g. film reviews), and satirical/comical content (including editorial cartoons, comics, and satirical poetry). Mladina also periodically publishes longer-running longer special issues containing a series of interviews or dedicated coverage on a particular topic (often involving religion, history, or politics; past subjects have included fascism, Jesus, the Bible, Karl Marx, Vladimir Putin, Islam, WWII in Slovenia, the October Revolution, and Angela Merkel).

Mladina's deputy editor, Ali Žerdin has said that the magazine's contributors are not hostile to the government, but just sceptical journalists pushing the government to make better choices. For example, in 2003, as Slovenia was entering NATO, statements in Mladina led to accusations that it was anti-NATO. Žerdin defended the magazine by saying that the government would not consider a rebuff in the referendum a vote against NATO.

Religion has also been a frequent topic in Mladina. The magazine has been critical of the Roman Catholic Church, such as its opposition to the rehabilitation of Gregorij Rožman, and has opposed the policies of the Slovenian cardinal Franc Rode, the Opus Dei and other conservative currents in the Church. It has also been accused of inciting anti-Catholic sentiment, most famously by the writer and essayist Drago Jančar in his essay "Slovenian Marginalities", published in 1999. In 2004, a controversy on whether or not Muslims should be allowed to build a mosque in Ljubljana broke out. Many of Slovenia's Muslims are first or second generation descendants of immigrant workers from other former Yugoslav regions (mostly Bosniaks and Albanians) and several chauvinist and right-wing groups have opposed the building of a mosque in Ljubljana, while Mladina fully supports its construction. However, in line with its liberal stance, Mladina was one of the few printed media in Slovenia that published the controversial cartoons of Mohammad in 2006. Mladina was subsequently criticised for its decision to publish the image, including by president Janez Drnovšek who blamed the magazine for a cancellation of a planned visit by a Sudanese delegation for scheduled peace negotiations to take place in Slovenia. Mladina responded to the criticism by pointing out that the image was used in its proper context, and that multiple Slovenian media organisations had likewise published such images before and after Mladina did so.

Ivo Standeker was a feature editor for Mladina working in Sarajevo when he was killed in June 1992.

== Notable contributors ==
Several famous people have collaborated with the magazine during its history. They include: sociologist and musician Gregor Tomc, journalist and politician Janez Janša, philosopher Slavoj Žižek, philosopher and literary theorist Rastko Močnik, political theorist Tomaž Mastnak and Vlasta Jalušič, journalist Jurij Gustinčič, sociologist and publicist Bernard Nežmah, film critic Marcel Štefančič Jr., jurist and human rights activist Matevž Krivic, cartoonist Tomaž Lavrič, the arts collective Neue Slowenische Kunst, and many others.

== See also ==
- List of magazines in Slovenia

== Bibliography ==
- Benderly Jill and Evan Kraft. "Independent Slovenia: Origins, Movements, Prospects". New York: NY, 1994
- Cox John K. "Slovenia: Evolving Loyalties". New York: Routledge, 2005
- Green, Peter. “War is Seen Influencing Slovenia’s Vote on NATO.” New York Times 22 March 2003, late ed.:
- Ramet Sabrina P. and Danica Fink-Hafner. "Democratic Transition in Slovenia". Texas: Texas A&M University Press, 2006
- Rumeni Internet – "Slovenia. Mladina Magazine, Slovenia". What is Mladina Magazine. 2007 20 September 2007
- Žižek, Slavoj. “Defenders of Faith.” New York Times 12 March 2006, late ed.:
