= Kočevski Rog massacre =

1945 Yugoslav massacres of Nazi Germany–allied Slovene Home Guard members

Coordinates: 45°40′10.63″N 14°56′10.68″E

- Part of the Bleiburg repatriations
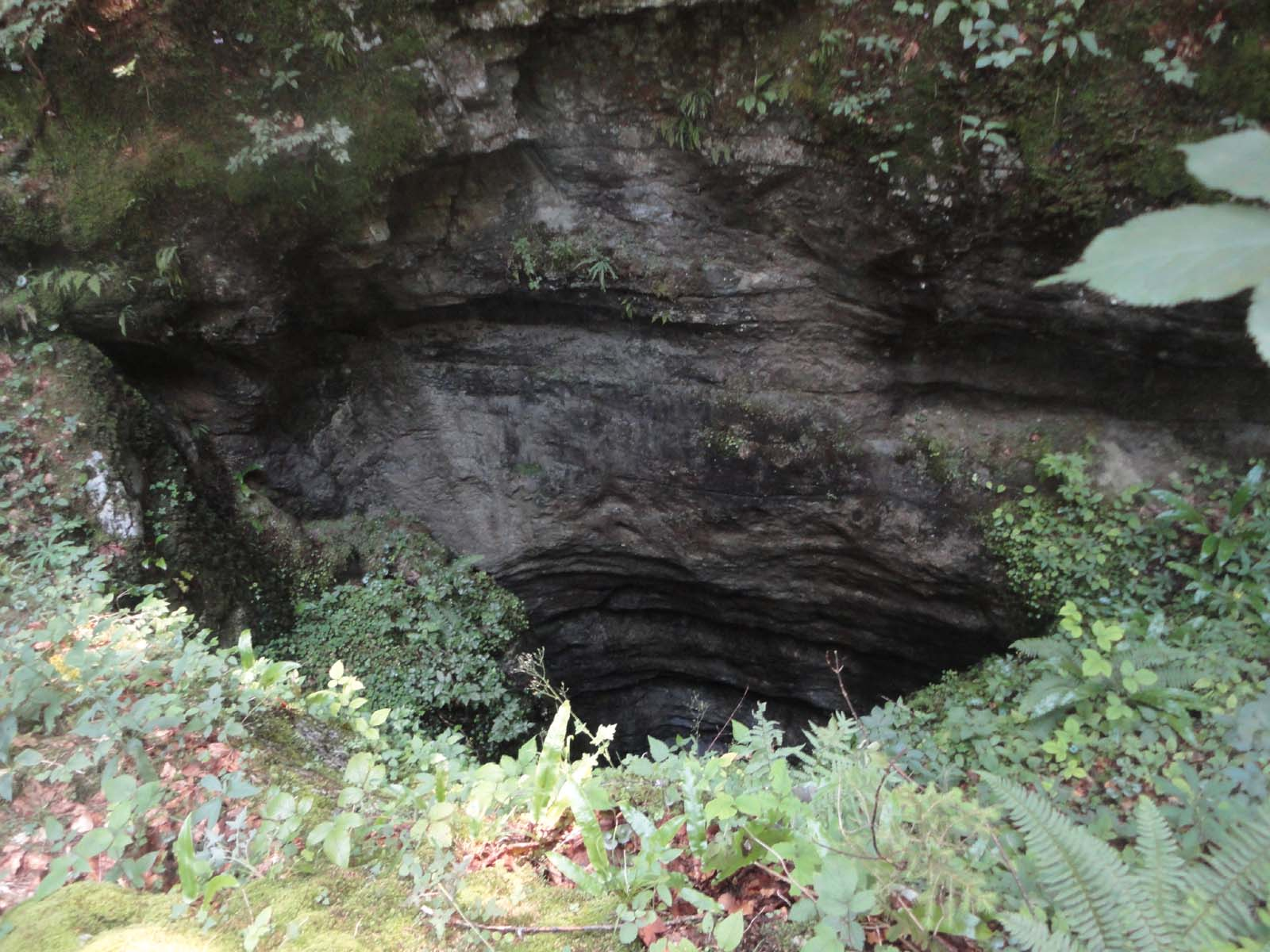
- A pit where Yugoslav Partisans threw members of Croatian, Slovenian, and Serbian units executed without trial
- Location: Kočevski Rog, PR Slovenia, Yugoslavia (now Slovenia)
- Date: May 1945
- Target: Axis-allied Slovene Home Guard, Croats, Serbs, and Montenegrins, and some Italian and German troops
- Deaths: 10,000+
- Perpetrator: Yugoslav Partisans

The Kočevski Rog massacre was a series of massacres near Kočevski Rog in late May 1945 in which thousands of members of the Nazi Germany–allied Slovene Home Guard were executed, without formal charges or trial, by special units of the Yugoslav Partisans; other victims were Croats, Serbs, and Montenegrins that had fought on the Axis side as well as much smaller numbers of Italian and German troops.

== Events ==
After the armistice, the British repatriated more than 10,000 Slovene soldiers that had fought against the Partisans and had attempted to retreat with the Germans; Josip Broz Tito had many of them massacred at karst shafts in the Kočevje region.

The killings continued after the war, as Tito's victorious forces took revenge on their perceived enemies. The British forces in Austria turned back tens of thousands of fleeing Yugoslavs. Estimates range from 30,000 to 55,000 killed between spring and autumn 1945. Most of these prisoners of war who were repatriated by the British military authorities from Austria, where they had fled, died in these post-war summary executions.

== Number of victims ==
The victims were thrown into various pits and caves, which were then sealed with explosives. There were many thousands of victims, including most of the more than 10,000 POWs.

The British historian Nikolai Tolstoy wrote an account of the events in his book The Minister and the Massacres. British author John Corsellis, who served in Austria with the British Army, also wrote of these events in his book Slovenia 1945: Memories of Death and Survival after World War II.

In his 1958 book Kočevje: Tito's Bloodiest Crime, Borivoje Karapandžić, a publicist and World War II propaganda chief for the Serbian fascist, anti-Semitic, and Nazi-collaborationist Zbor organization of Dimitrije Ljotić, estimated the total number of victims at about 18,500: 12,000 Slovene Home Guard, 3,000 Serbian volunteer troops, 2,500 Croatian Home Guard, and 1,000 Montenegrin chetniks. Karapandžić's evaluation is reported in another newer book printed in Slovene and Italian by a group of scholars.

== Notable victims ==
- France Dejak (1925–2003), thrown into a pit but escaped
- Odon Peterka (1925–1945), poet
