= Franci Demšar =

Slovenian physicist and politician

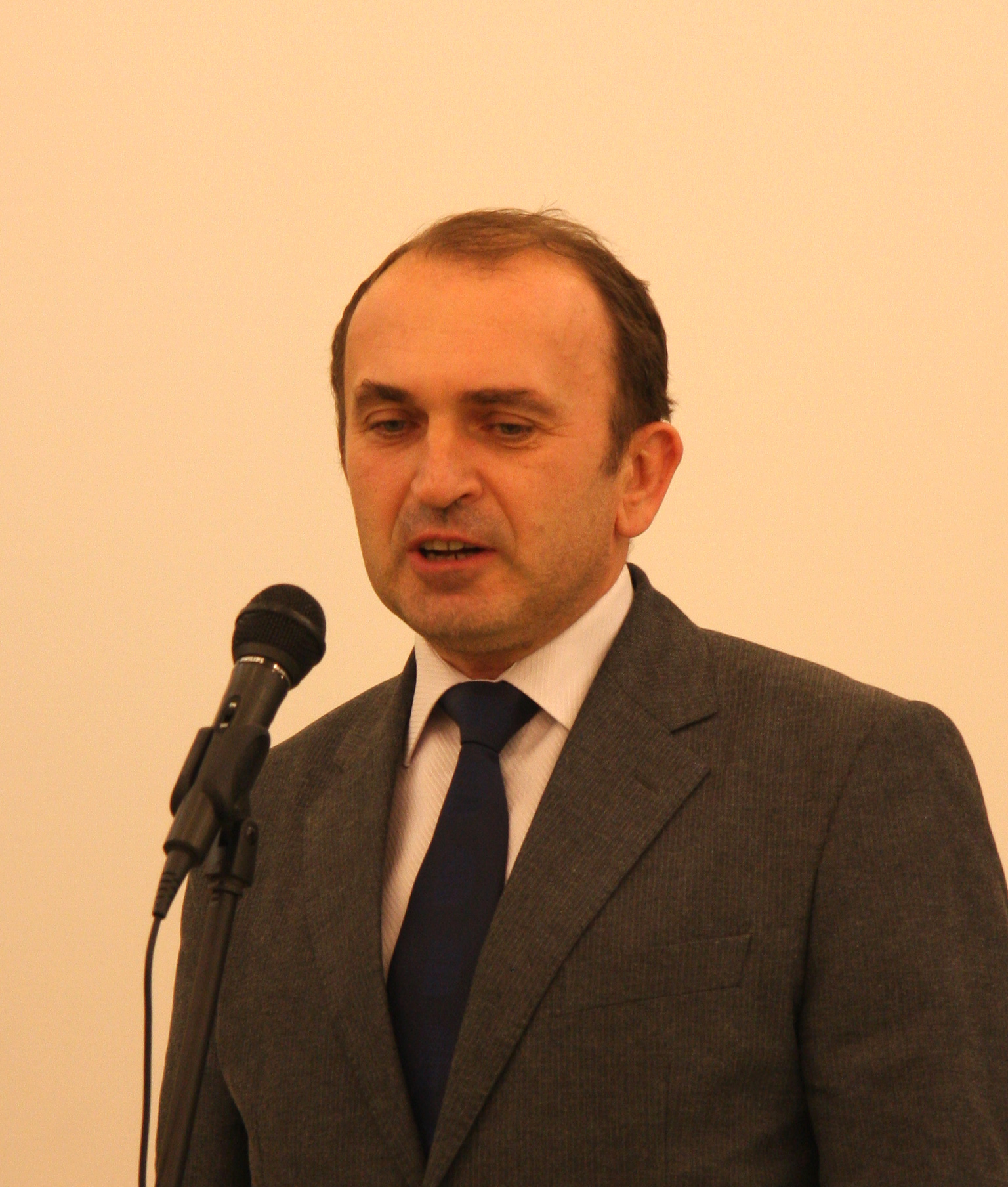
Franci Demšar

Franci Demšar (born 4 February 1960) is a Slovenian physicist and politician.

From 1997 to 1999, he was Secretary of State at the Ministry of Science and Technology. From 4 February 1999 to 7 June 2000, he served as the Minister of Defence of the Republic of Slovenia. From 2001 to 2004, he was the Slovenian ambassador in the Russian Federation.

From 1 October 2004 to 30 October 2014, he was the Director of the Slovenian Research Agency. Since March 2018, he has been the Director of the Slovenian Quality Assurance Agency for Higher Education (NAKVIS). In 2020, he was elected President of the Central and Eastern European Network of Quality Assurance Agencies in Higher Education (CEENQA), and reelected in September 2022.
