= Viktor Blažič =

Slovenian journalist, essayist, translator and anti-Communist dissident

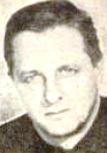
Viktor Blažič

Viktor Blažič (19 July 1928 – 25 June 2014) was a Slovenian journalist, essayist, translator and former anti-Communist dissident.

He was born in the village of Smolenja Vas near Novo Mesto in south-eastern Slovenia, then part of the Kingdom of Serbs, Croats and Slovenes. In 1944, he joined the partisan resistance. After World War II, he became a journalist. In the early 1960s, he was member of the editorial board of the alternative journal Perspektive. In the early 1970s, he was one of the founders of the environmentalist movement in Slovenia.

== Arrest ==
Due to his critical articles on behalf of the Titoist regime, Blažič was arrested in May 1976 together with the judge Franc Miklavčič, and sentenced to three years in prison for "enemy propaganda". Later it was disclosed that Blažič's and Miklavčič's arrest was meant as a retaliation against the poet and thinker Edvard Kocbek who was too famous abroad to be arrested by the regime. Instead two of his friends and collaborators were arrested in order to "bring Kocbek back to order", that is to intimidate him in order to ensure his conformity with the Communist regime.

Blažič was released in 1978, and found a job in the National and University Library of Slovenia, where he befriended the intellectual and historian Lojze Ude. Since the 1980s, Blažič has published several essays dealing with the nature of the Communist regimes and of totalitarian regimes in general. He has also worked as a translator, mainly from Russian.

== Slovene Christian Social Movement ==
In 1989, Blažič was one of the co-founders of the Slovene Christian Social Movement (later renamed to Slovene Christian Democrats), but has not been involved in active politics. By the mid 1990s, he distanced himself from the Christian Democrats and assumed a position close to the Social Democratic Party of Slovenia (now Slovenian Democratic Party, not to be confused with the Social Democrats), although he never became a member of the party, nor publicly endorsed its candidates. In 2004, he was among the co-founders of the liberal conservative civic platform Rally for the Republic (Slovene: Zbor za republiko).

Most of his life, he lived in Ljubljana.

== See also ==
- Slovenians
- Edvard Kocbek
