= Johann Pucher =

Slovene priest, scientist, photographer, artist and poet (1814–1864)

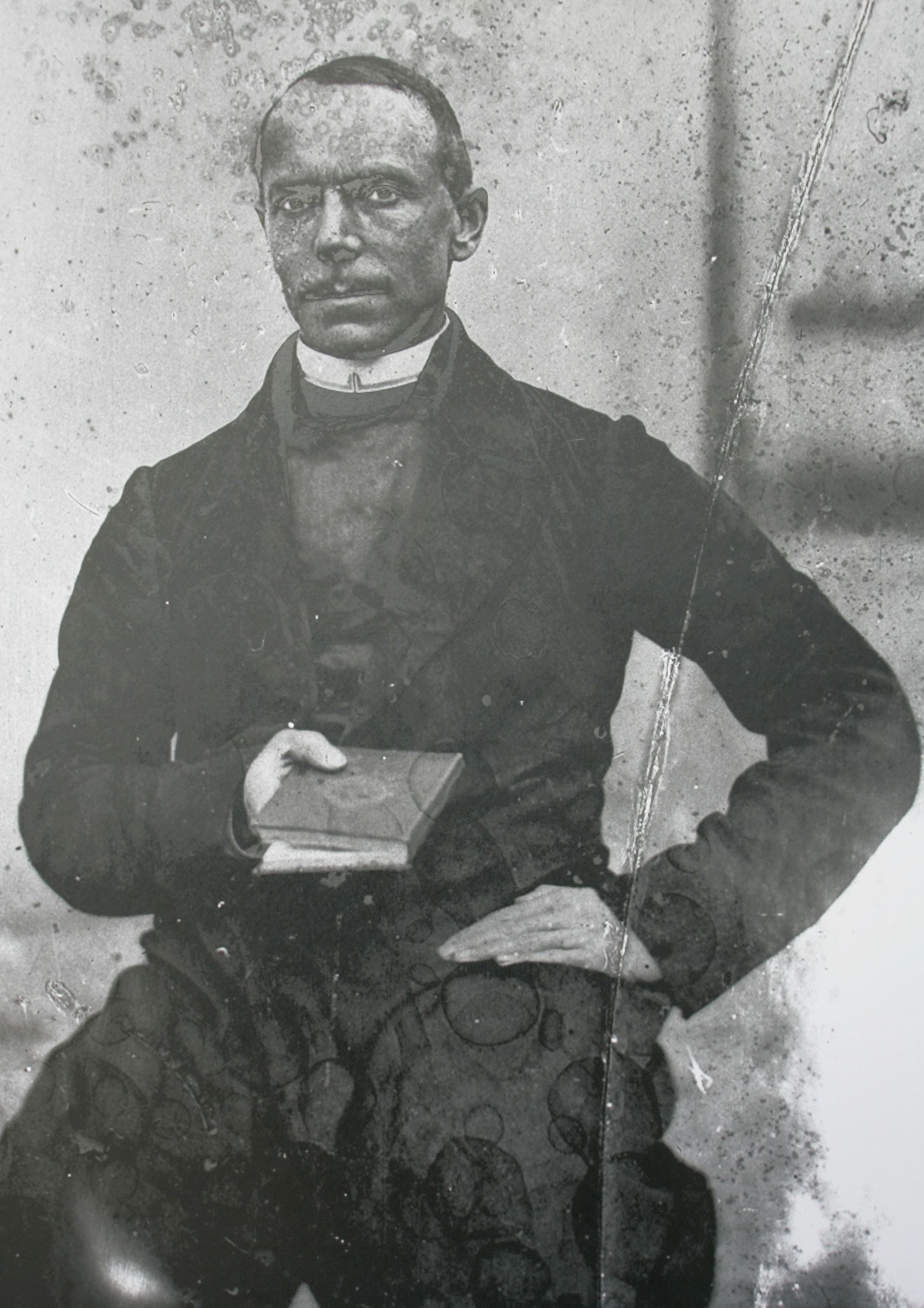
- Self-portrait,
- Born: Augustin Johann Pucher; August 26, 1814; Krainburg, Duchy of Carniola, Austrian Empire (now Kranj, Slovenia)
- Died: August 7, 1864 (aged 49); Krainburg, Duchy of Carniola, Austrian Empire
- Other name: Janez Avguštin Puhar
- Occupations: Priest, inventor, photographer

Johann Augustin Pucher (Slovene: Janez Avguštin Puhar or Ivan Pucher; August 26, 1814 – August 7, 1864) was a Slovene priest, scientist, photographer, artist, and poet who invented an unusual process for making photographs on glass.

Although his were not the first glass photographs, (Note: Several standard histories of photography widely available during the past sixty years have mentioned the photographs on glass made by John Herschel in September 1839 (e.g., Gernsheim 1986, p. 16), sometimes including an illustration. What is by some definitions the very first successful photograph (i.e., an image produced by the action of light but reasonably light-fast and durable in its final form), a contact-exposed copy of an engraving, was made on glass by the bitumen process of Nicéphore Niépce in 1822 (Gernsheim 1986, p. 9). The later physautotype process, co-invented by Niépce and Louis Daguerre in the early 1830s, was also used to produce photographs on glass, possibly including one mentioned by John Herschel in a 9 May 1839 letter to Henry Fox Talbot in which he reports visiting Daguerre in Paris and being shown "... all his Pictures on Silver ... and also one on glass" (Herschel 1839). Like Pucher's process, these experimental pre-1840 glass processes were never commercialized.) Pucher's process was unique. It was the only 19th-century photography technique that was not based on expensive silver halide chemistry but was still sensitive enough to use in a camera, with exposure times comparable to those of the daguerreotype and calotype. (Other non-silver processes, such as the cyanotype, were practical only for making prints or photograms in direct sunlight.) Modern testing of Pucher's photographs has confirmed their chemically unusual nature. However, his process was never commercialized, and attempts to recreate it based on published information have been unsuccessful.

== Biography ==
Pucher was born on August 26, 1814 in Kranj in the Duchy of Carniola in the Austrian Empire (now Slovenia). He was the son of Joseph Pucher and Maria Lebar Pucher, and he was baptized Augustin Johann Pucher.

As a schoolchild, Pucher was interested in art, languages, and the natural sciences, especially chemistry and physics. He wanted to study art, but obeyed his mother's wish and became a Catholic priest. However, he continued to experiment in photography, art, and music. When the French Academy of Sciences announced the invention of the daguerreotype on August 19, 1839, Pucher quickly mastered the process, but it was too expensive, so he developed his own way of making photographs. On April 19, 1842, he invented a photographic process on glass that he called the hyalotype, or svetlopis in Slovene. His photos are also called puharotypes, in his honor. A report about his invention was published in the newspaper Carniolia in 1841.

While living in Bled, Pucher met a French viscount, Louis de Dax, who wrote about him in the Parisian magazine La Lumière. The church then moved Pucher to a small village, Cerklje, where his contacts abroad lessened. Ultimately, he became sick from the harmful substances used in his experiments. He died of "hectic fever" (German: Zehrfieber) at the age of 49.

== Hyalotype process ==
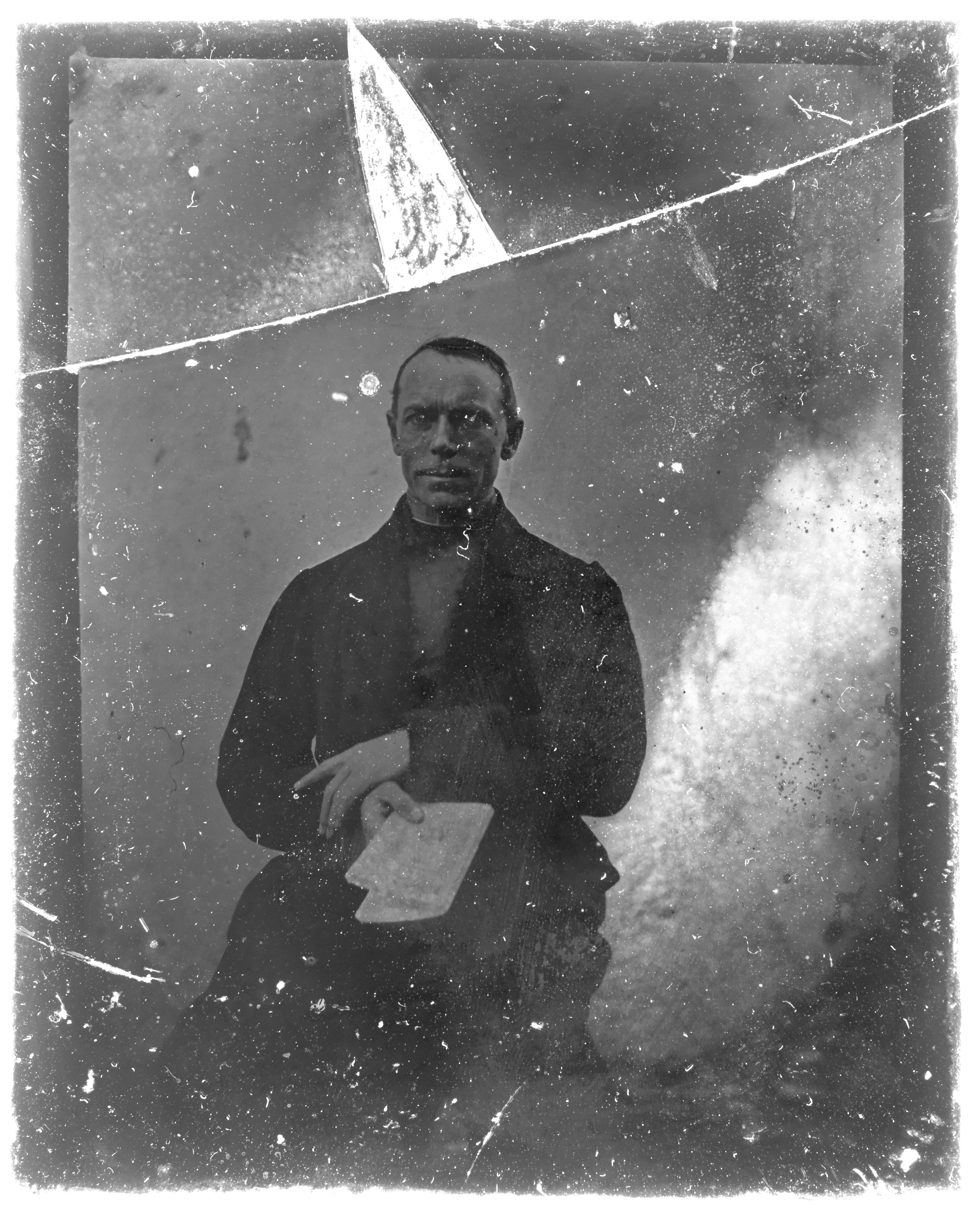
Hyalotype with self-portrait by Johann Pucher

According to Pucher's records of his photographic process, he coated a small glass plate with a layer of light-sensitive sulfur, exposed it to iodine vapors, and inserted the prepared plate into a camera. He then poured mercury into a metal container, placed the mercury at the bottom of the camera, and heated it from below. He exposed the prepared plate to light for 15 seconds, and mercury vapors coated the exposed places on the picture. Pucher strengthened the picture with bromine steam and fixed it by wrapping it with alcohol. Finally, he preserved the photo with varnish.

The advantages of Pucher's procedure included a shorter exposure time (15 seconds, which allowed him to make portraits), a positive image, and the possibility of reproduction.

Pucher was not the first to try to create photos on glass: A Frenchman, Abel Niépce de Saint-Victor, reported his own invention to the French Academy of Sciences in 1847. It was not until January 1851 that the Austrian Academy of Sciences published a report on Pucher's method.

== Surviving work ==
Known photos by Pucher, mostly kept in the National Museum of Slovenia and in the Museum of Architecture and Design in Ljubljana, are:

- Self-portrait, reproduction of a lost original, National Museum
- Self-portrait, original on glass, 10 × 12 cm, National Museum
- Portrait of a man, original on glass, 9.4 × 11.5 cm, National Museum
- Portrait of a woman, original on glass, 10.3 × 12.1 cm, National Museum
- Andrej Vavken in Cerklje na Gorenjskem, original on glass, 6.7 × 8.4 cm, Museum of Architecture and Design
- Portrait of the composer Andrej Vavken and the painter Ivan Franke, original on glass, 9.7 × 11.5 cm, private collection

=== Reproductions ===
- Bled island, colored photo reproduction of a graphic motif on paper, 6.5 × 5.1 cm, National Museum
- Last Supper, colored photo reproduction of a graphic motif on paper, 7.8 × 6 cm, National Museum
- Gregor Rihar in a boat in Bled, photo reproduction of a drawing on paper, 9.1 × 6.3 cm, National Museum

=== Lost photos ===
Most of Pucher's photos have been lost, including:

- 2 sent to a scientific assembly in Ljubljana in 1849
- 4 sent to Viscount Louis de Dax
- Photographs sent to the Austrian Academy of Sciences
- Photographs presented at world exhibitions in London, New York, and Paris
- Portraits of relatives destroyed during World War II

=== Poetry ===
Pucher wrote at least 15 poems in Slovene and 4 in German. Some of them were set to music by prominent composers.

== Awards and honors ==
In recognition of Pucher's contribution to the Slovene national identity and the development of photographic science, Slovenia declared 2014 to be Pucher's Year. The honorary patronage of the jubilee was approved by President Borut Pahor. A yearlong program of events in Slovenia and abroad was organized in cooperation with many municipalities and institutions to celebrate the 200th anniversary of his birth.

Several items and locations are named after Pucher:

- Janez Pucher Award, given by the Photographic Federation of Slovenia (Slovene: Fotografska zveza Slovenije) for exceptional achievement in photography
- Puharotype, Pucher's photo procedure
- Puharjeva ulica, a street in Ljubljana
- Puharjeva ulica, a street in Kranj
- Pucher Prize, given by the Janez Puhar Photo Society in Kranj (Slovene: Fotografsko društvo Janez Puhar Kranj)
- Pucher Medal, given by the Janez Puhar Photo Society in Kranj for the best portrait at International Federation of Photographic Art (FIAP) exhibitions
- OŠ Janeza Puharja Kranj Center, Primary school in Kranj
